= Saturday Night Live season 8 =

Saturday Night Live
- Season 8
- Starring: Robin Duke; Mary Gross; Tim Kazurinsky; Brad Hall; Gary Kroeger; Julia Louis-Dreyfus; Eddie Murphy; Joe Piscopo
- No. of episodes: 20

Release
- Original network: NBC
- Original release: September 25, 1982 – May 14, 1983

Season chronology
- ← Previous season 7 Next → season 9

The eighth season of Saturday Night Live, an American sketch comedy series, originally aired in the United States on NBC between September 25, 1982, and May 14, 1983.

== Format changes ==
For the season, Dick Ebersol brought back the show's opening phrase "Live from New York, it's Saturday Night!", the monologues by the hosts and Don Pardo as announcer. Ebersol also changed Weekend Update's name for the second time, to Saturday Night News. Since Brian Doyle-Murray and Christine Ebersole had both been dropped, a new anchor was needed for the segment. Brad Hall got the gig and became the new anchor.

== Notable moments ==
Notable moments of this season included Drew Barrymore hosting the show—the youngest ever person to host. During the episode, the audience at home was given the chance to vote on whether or not Andy Kaufman should be banned from the show. The vote was conducted by a 1-900 number. At the end of the show the people had spoken, and Kaufman was banned from ever performing on SNL again.

With the release of the film 48 Hrs. during season eight, Eddie Murphy's star began to eclipse the other cast members. Murphy's co-star in the film, Nick Nolte, was scheduled to host the show, but canceled at the last minute. Ebersol offered Murphy the chance to host, a move that Piscopo would perceive as a major slight. Piscopo would later claim that Ebersol used Murphy's success to divide the two erstwhile friends and play them against one another.

== Cast ==
Before the start of the season, Brian Doyle-Murray, Christine Ebersole and Tony Rosato were dropped from the cast. To fill the void, Dick Ebersol went to The Second City to look for performers; however, Second City was tired of losing their talent to network shows and instead directed him to The Practical Theatre Company, where Ebersol discovered Brad Hall, Gary Kroeger and Julia Louis-Dreyfus. The three were hired to the SNL cast on the spot.

=== Cast roster ===
Repertory players

- Robin Duke
- Mary Gross
- **Brad Hall**
- Tim Kazurinsky
- Gary Kroeger
- Julia Louis-Dreyfus
- Eddie Murphy
- Joe Piscopo

bold denotes Weekend Update anchor

== Writers ==
Before the season, Paul Barrosse (who also came from the Practical Theatre Company) was added as a writer. This would be his only season on the writing staff. Returning cast members Robin Duke, Eddie Murphy and Joe Piscopo, previously uncredited for their writing contributions, were given writing credits starting this season.

This season's writers were Paul Barrosse, Barry W. Blaustein, Robin Duke, Ellen L. Fogle, Nate Herman, Tim Kazurinsky, Gary Kroeger, Andy Kurtzman, Eddie Murphy, Pamela Norris (episodes 12-20), Margaret Oberman, Joe Piscopo, David Sheffield, Andrew Smith, Bob Tischler, Tracy Tormé and Eliot Wald. The head writer was Bob Tischler.

Among a few one-season writers, this would also be the final season for writers Barry Blaustein and David Sheffield, who both leave the show after three seasons since 1980–making them some of the last writer's remaining from Jean Doumanian's sole season as producer.

== Episodes ==
| No. overall | No. in season | Host(s) | Musical guest(s) | Original release date |
|---|---|---|---|---|
| 140 | 1 | Chevy Chase | Queen | September 25, 1982 |
Queen performs "Crazy Little Thing Called Love" (introduced by Danny DeVito in a short cameo) and "Under Pressure" (Queen's final live performance in America with Freddie Mercury); Host Chevy Chase performed from Burbank, California, via satellite. His segments were done from NBC's Studio 1 and the set of The Tonight Show Starring Johnny Carson.; Guest appearances by Siskel & Ebert who review a few of the sketches.; Brad Hall, Gary Kroeger and Julia Louis-Dreyfus' first episode as cast members.; Don Pardo returns as announcer.
| 141 | 2 | Louis Gossett Jr. | George Thorogood & the Destroyers | October 2, 1982 |
George Thorogood & The Destroyers performs "Bad to the Bone" and "Back to Wentzville".; Mr. T appears in the "Mister Robinson's Neighborhood" and "Mr. and Mrs. T Bloody Mary Mix" sketches.; Guest appearance by Robert Judd as Eddie Murphy's father.
| 142 | 3 | Ron Howard | The Clash | October 9, 1982 |
The Clash performs "Straight to Hell" and "Should I Stay or Should I Go", from their recently released album Combat Rock.; Guest appearance by Harry Anderson.; Ron Howard reprised his Opie Taylor character in the "Mayberry 1982" sketch; Andy Griffith also appeared in the sketch, reprising his character Andy Taylor.
| 143 | 4 | Howard Hesseman | Men at Work | October 23, 1982 |
Men at Work performs "Who Can It Be Now?" and "Down Under".
| 144 | 5 | Michael Keaton | The New Joe Jackson Band | October 30, 1982 |
Joe Jackson performs "Steppin' Out" and "Another World".; Guest appearance by Michael Palin.; Robin Duke does not appear in this episode.
| 145 | 6 | Robert Blake | Kenny Loggins | November 13, 1982 |
Kenny Loggins performs "Heart to Heart" and "I Gotta Try".; Merv Griffin appeared in the cold opening.; Dick Ebersol makes a rare on screen appearance explaining why Andy Kaufman hasn't been on the show in a while, saying that Kaufman "Is not funny anymore". As it turns out, this was an elaborate plan of Kaufman's that would carry on into next week's episode.; During the week, Blake was very hard to work with and reportedly threw a crumpled script into the face of cast member/writer Gary Kroeger. Blake would be banned from ever hosting again.
| 146 | 7 | Drew Barrymore | Squeeze | November 20, 1982 |
Squeeze performs "Annie Get Your Gun" and "Pulling Mussels (from the Shell)".; At age 7, Barrymore is the youngest person to host Saturday Night Live.; During this episode, the audience at home was given the chance to vote on whether or not Andy Kaufman, a regular guest on SNL, should be banned from the show. The vote was conducted via a 1-900 number. At the end of the night, the people had spoken, and Kaufman was banned from ever performing on SNL again.
| 147 | 8 | The Smothers Brothers | Laura Branigan | December 4, 1982 |
Laura Branigan performs "Gloria" and "Living a Lie".
| 148 | 9 | Eddie Murphy | Lionel Richie | December 11, 1982 |
Lionel Richie performs "You Are" and "Truly".; Eddie Murphy substituted for his 48 Hours co-star Nick Nolte after Nolte fell ill; to date, he is the only SNL host to host the show while still performing as a cast member on it.; During the cold opening Murphy announced: "Live from New York, it's the Eddie Murphy Show!"; Steve Martin appeared near the end to chastise Eddie Murphy for being a second choice. This was the only appearance by Steve Martin in an SNL episode not produced by Lorne Michaels.; Guest appearance by Harry Anderson.; The bumper photos feature Murphy's head pasted over Nolte's head.
| 149 | 10 | Lily Tomlin | Tomlin as Purvis Hawkins | January 22, 1983 |
Lily Tomlin acts as both host and musical guest for this episode.; Tomlin (as Hawkins) performs "We Care"; As Murphy did the episode before, Tomlin opens the show by announcing: "Live from New York, it's the Lily Tomlin Show!"; Andy Kaufman makes a guest appearance in a pre-taped segment, ostensibly as "bought commercial time" since this is the only way he can still get to appear on SNL. It would be the last time Kaufman would appear on any form on SNL.; Guest appearances by Bob and Doug McKenzie to promote the following week's show.
| 150 | 11 | Rick Moranis; Dave Thomas | The BusBoys | January 29, 1983 |
The BusBoys perform "The Boys Are Back in Town" and "New Shoes".
| 151 | 12 | Sid Caesar | Joe Cocker; Jennifer Warnes | February 5, 1983 |
Joe Cocker and Jennifer Warnes perform "Up Where We Belong" and Cocker performed "Seven Days".; Guest appearance by Harry Anderson.; The cold open does not end with the traditional "Live from New York, it's Saturday Night", instead it fades straight to the opening titles.; During the goodnights, the cast present Caeser with a plaque, proclaiming him an "honorary cast member".
| 152 | 13 | Howard Hesseman | Tom Petty & The Heartbreakers | February 19, 1983 |
Tom Petty and the Heartbreakers perform "The Waiting" and "Change of Heart".; Howard Hesseman presents a film tribute to the late John Belushi prepared by Belushi's wife.
| 153 | 14 | Beau Bridges; Jeff Bridges | Randy Newman | February 26, 1983 |
Randy Newman performs "I Love L.A." and "Real Emotional Girl".; Lloyd Bridges appeared via telephone in the monologue, telling his sons to "put on the gloves to settle their differences like they used to as children."
| 154 | 15 | Bruce Dern | Leon Redbone | March 12, 1983 |
Leon Redbone performs "Sweet Sue", "When You Wish Upon a Star" and "I Ain't Got Nobody".; This show features the death of Buckwheat which would carry on to next week's episode.
| 155 | 16 | Robert Guillaume | Duran Duran | March 19, 1983 |
Duran Duran performs "Hungry Like the Wolf" and "Girls on Film".
| 156 | 17 | Joan Rivers | Musical Youth | April 9, 1983 |
Musical Youth performs "Pass the Dutchie" and "Never Gonna Give You Up".
| 157 | 18 | Susan Saint James | Michael McDonald | April 16, 1983 |
Michael McDonald performs "If That's What It Takes" and "I Can Let Go Now".; Guest appearance by Steven Wright.
| 158 | 19 | Stevie Wonder | Stevie Wonder | May 7, 1983 |
Stevie Wonder performs "Overjoyed" and "Go Home".; Guest appearances by Michael Davis, Greg Dean and Andy Murphy.
| 159 | 20 | Ed Koch | Kevin Rowland & Dexys Midnight Runners | May 14, 1983 |
Kevin Rowland and Dexys Midnight Runners perform "Come On Eileen" and "The Celtic Soul Brothers".; Guest appearances by Marv Albert, Harry Anderson and Don King.
