= Recurring Saturday Night Live characters and sketches introduced 1980–81 =

The following is a list of recurring Saturday Night Live characters and sketches introduced between November 15, 1980, and April 11, 1981, the sixth season of SNL.

== Vickie & Debbie ==
A Gail Matthius and Denny Dillon sketch. Debuted November 15, 1980.

== What's It All About ==
A Gilbert Gottfried and Denny Dillon sketch. Debuted November 15, 1980.

== Paulie Herman ==
A Joe Piscopo sketch. Debuted December 6, 1980. Paulie Herman was a stereotypical "Jersey Guy" who liked to make fun of Piscataway Township, New Jersey residents. He was a rather annoying character who would constantly say, "I'm from Jersey!" and, when other characters mentioned the state, "You from Jersey? What exit?"

The character triggered an immediate outcry from residents of the area, and New Jersey as a whole. The mayor of Piscataway was extremely offended because he thought that the sketch depicted his hometown as a "chemical disaster area." He demanded an apology, and even threatened to complain to the FCC. The mayor stated that Piscataway was "the Sunbelt of New Jersey." The sketch was soon dropped, but the character appeared one more time in a sketch about "Overexposed Characters" with Eddie Murphy's Velvet Jones, who stated he would also become overexposed.

Appearances

Season	Episode	Host	Notes
6	December 6, 1980	Ellen Burstyn	
6	December 13, 1980	Jamie Lee Curtis	
6	January 17, 1981	Karen Black	
6	February 14, 1981	Debbie Harry	
6	March 7, 1981	Bill Murray	
7	January 23, 1982	Robert Conrad	

== Raheem Abdul Muhammed ==
An Eddie Murphy sketch. Debuted December 6, 1980.

Appearances

Season	Episode	Host	Notes
6	December 6, 1980	Ellen Burstyn	
6	April 11, 1981	None	
7	October 3, 1981	None	
7	October 31, 1981	Donald Pleasence	
7	December 5, 1981	Tim Curry	
7	February 6, 1982	James Coburn	
7	February 20, 1982	Bruce Dern	Focus On Film
7	March 20, 1982	Robert Urich	Focus On Film
8	October 9, 1982	Ron Howard	Focus On Film
8	October 30, 1982	Michael Keaton	

== Mary Louise ==
A Denny Dillon sketch. Debuted December 6, 1980.

== Nadine and Rowena ==
A Denny Dillon and Gail Matthius sketch. Debuted December 13, 1980.

== The Livelys ==
A Charles Rocket and Gail Matthius sketch. Debuted January 17, 1981.

== Mister Robinson's Neighborhood ==
Mister Robinson's Neighborhood was a parody of the children's show Mister Rogers' Neighborhood, a PBS staple in which information about the world was presented by Fred Rogers in a quiet, methodical, loving, and highly elocuted manner. In the sketch, Eddie Murphy's character, named "Mister Robinson", speaks and presents his show in a similarly patient manner, but lives in a considerably grittier venue, and engages in a number of illegal and unethical activities for money due to his lack of a job. He educates his viewers about these activities in each episode, while also teaching them cynical views about the government and life in general. For example, in one episode he tells his viewers that their hopes and dreams are pointless because it's impossible to find a job in the current economy, and another episode contains a spoof of the Neighborhood of Make-Believe segment in which a puppet Ronald Reagan (whom Robinson consistently blames for his lack of a job and dire financial situation) dismissingly tells the ghetto family hand puppets (represented as a brown glove with different small wigs on the fingers) that he cannot do anything to help them out of poverty. Subsequently, Mr. Landlord (portrayed by Tim Kazurinsky) hunts him down for unpaid rent and sleeping with his wife, Mrs. Landlord (portrayed by Robin Duke), and later gives him eviction notices. Police officers (one performed offscreen by Gary Kroeger) also pursue Robinson, investigating his various crimes. A majority of episodes end with Robinson fleeing from these people via the fire escape while singing a variant of Rogers' famous song "Tomorrow" and then wishes the viewers farewell.

In the May 12, 1984 finale of Season 9, two episodes after Murphy left the cast, New York City Mayor Ed Koch performed a parody of the sketch on the original set entitled "Mayor Koch's Neighborhood."

During interviews with Stephen Colbert and Jimmy Kimmel in October 2019, Murphy expressed interest in reprising the sketch for when he returned to host the show in December. On December 21, 2019, Murphy reprised the role, in a newly updated version of the sketch in which Mister Robinson's Neighborhood has become gentrified.

Fred Rogers took no offense to Murphy's parody version of his show and found it amusing and affectionate, though he was grateful that Saturday Night Live was broadcast at a time when the children in his audience were unlikely to see it.

Appearances

Season	Episode	Host	Notes
6	February 21, 1981	Charlene Tilton	Mister Robinson states that his wife will be home soon, and teaches his viewers the word "bitch", and that a kid can be slapped for calling their mom that. He is then visited by a delivery man named Mr. Speedy who gives him a chemistry set that costs $125.00. Mister Robinson just shoves him in the hall and closes the door, stating to the viewers that they should not play around with chemicals unless they know what they are doing, and asks if they can say "Richard Pryor." Saying that Mister Robinson will play with his chemistry set a little bit later, he then takes the viewers to a cardboard model of his apartment building called the Magical City of Fantasy, and comments about the state of his neighborhood. Saying that the taxi cabs don't stop where Mister Robinson lives, he smashes a toy taxi cab with a coke bottle. Mister Robinson then takes his leave since he has to walk to his work 63 blocks away. After Mister Robinson leaves, the exterior of his apartment is shown as one of the rooms ignites with a flash.
7	October 17, 1981	George Kennedy	Mister Robinson mentions how his wife walked out on him, receives an eviction notice from Mr. Landlord, teaches the kids the word "scumbucket", and mentioned how he had the money for the rent until his wife came home with a new dress. Then he takes the viewers on a trip to the Magical Land of Make-Believe, where President Ronald Reagan is asked by a ghetto family why he cut off their relief fund, causing them to be evicted from their apartment. Ronald Reagan says that he can't help them. When the ghetto family asks why they don't make airplanes so that they can have a full lunch, Ronald Reagan states that he can't answer that question either. When one ghetto family member states that he speaks for all black people, Ronald Reagan states that he has no more time for questions and apologizes. Mister Robinson says that he's got to go as he drops the Ronald Reagan puppet.
7	February 6, 1982	James Coburn	Despite Mr. Landlord shutting off Mr. Robinson's heat, he teaches the kids the words "mutha" and "pyromaniac" (in rebus form). Then, he gets a nearby thug to attempt to read the word, but he sets Mr. Landlord's apartment on fire instead. This is the only Mr. Robinson sketch that takes place outside his apartment room.
8	October 2, 1982	Louis Gossett Jr.	Mister Robinson teaches the kids the word "music" on his Soul Train Scramble Board and shows them the drums he stole from the back of Smokey Robinson's van when he was performing at the Apollo Theater. When he starts playing the drums, he gets a call from someone complaining that his drumming is too loud, to which he responds by blowing a whistle into the phone. When Mister Robinson plays the drums again, his new neighbor knocks on his door demanding he stop playing the drums. Mister Robinson states that he installed a new lock in his door so that his neighbor can't get in. Unfortunately, the new neighbor happens to be Mr. T, who breaks down the door. Grabbing Mister Robinson by the throat, Mr. T announces that the word of the day has been changed to "pain". After making Mister Robinson sing his closing song, Mr. T quotes "Goodnight boys and girls" as he continues to strangle Mister Robinson.
8	May 14, 1983	Ed Koch	With summer around the corner, Mister Robinson teaches the kids how to make money by selling stolen items on the streets, like a car stereo taken from a BMW, wallets (one of which still has part of someone's pant leg on it), gold chains, earrings (with one having part of someone's ear on it), and jewelry with initials on it. He also teaches the kids the word "entrepreneur", with a sign that has it spelled "ontapanure". When a police officer knocks at the door, Mister Robinson takes his items and sneaks out the fire escape.
9	October 15, 1983	Danny DeVito, Rhea Perlman	Mister Robinson receives a basket from his old friend Juanita. The basket contains a baby as a result of him having seen Juanita 9 months ago, leading him to teach the viewers the word "bastard", explaining that the word can also be used by taxicab drivers. After telling the viewers about how parents have sex or would adopt to get a child, Mister Robinson states that people could also get babies off the black market if the mother is an alcoholic and the father has no job. He calls up his friend Ratso to ask about the going rate for newborn babies on the black market, describing the one he has. Mister Robinson learns that the rate is $1,000. Mr. Landlord knocks on Mister Robinson's door, voicing his knowledge that Robinson "played around" with his wife Mrs. Landlord (performed offscreen by Robin Duke). As Mrs. Landlord states that she didn't tell him, Mr. Landlord tells his wife to shut up, and yells that no jury would convict him of killing Mister Robinson. Mister Robinson takes the baby out the fire escape, planning to take it on a stroll in another state before selling it.
9	November 12, 1983	Teri Garr	Mister Robinson enters with a bag of groceries, saying that groceries used to cost much less, and that he will explain how to get them cheaply. He then explains how he stole the bag from a woman who paid him to carry it to her car. He uses the groceries to illustrate "food groups" such as "fruit drinks and other liquids", and "frozen foods". He then teaches the viewers the word "nutrition", which he pronounces as Nut Rit Rion, and says that a turkey has the same amount of nutrition as a T-bone steak, like the one he had sneaked out of a supermarket in his pants. He then shows the viewers the sign "Shoplifters will be Prosecuted", stating that the latter is what they need to "watch out for", since they already know what the former word means. Mr. Landlord knocks on Mister Robinson's door, saying that some police officers want to ask him about a bag of groceries. Robinson then explains that groceries have to be kept in a cool dry place, and it is starting to get "too hot" in his apartment building. Sneaking out the fire escape with the groceries, he announces his plan to take them someplace that's much cooler, such as his friend Willy's place. Taped September 1983
9	January 21, 1984	Michael Palin	Mister Robinson enters with a Yorkshire Terrier named Cujo that he was playing with in the park. He states that some kids come up to him and ask him why he doesn't have a job. Mister Robinson tells the viewers the flaws of trying to be a firefighter, a police officer, a doctor, a lawyer, or a banker. Saying that it's impossible to find a job in the current economy, Mister Robinson states that one would have to get a job by making one up themselves. He suggests that one could make money through "telephone solicitation", and calls up Mrs. Herbert Green to tell her to check whether her dog is missing. While waiting for her answer, he teaches the viewers the word "ransom." Mister Robinson asks Mrs. Green if she can count to 100 by unmarked 10s, only to hear that she can only count to 50. Mister Robinson tells her to count higher, and pretends to be Cujo saying to pay because Robinson has a knife. Mr. Landlord knocks on the door, asking Mister Robinson if he has a dog in his apartment. Saying that Mr. Landlord doesn't allow dogs in the apartment building because they don't pay rent, Mr. Robinson takes Cujo and sneaks out the fire escape to teach him the game "fetch the wallet" as he waits for the ransom money. Taped September 1983
10	December 15, 1984	Eddie Murphy	During the Christmas season, Mister Robinson receives another eviction notice from Mr. Landlord, which is why he has to sneak into his building dressed as Santa Claus. He explains that this disguise also helps with his "small business" of collecting money he claims is for the Salvation Army. Mr. Robinson teaches the kids about X-Mas, claiming that ex-con starts with X. Then he goes over the gifts he has, like a doll with its head replaced with a cabbage, to be passed off as a Cabbage Patch Kids doll to be sold to "stupid little kids." When an unidentified man knocks on Mister Robinson's door asking if he's the guy who sold his kid a "head of cabbage with a dress on it," Mister Robinson teaches the kids another word that he claims starts with X: "escape", as he sneaks out the fire escape.
45	December 21, 2019	Eddie Murphy	After a lengthy absence, Mister Robinson's neighborhood becomes gentrified, as the other African-American inhabitants accepted payments to move to Atlanta. Mister Robinson teaches the viewers about squatters' rights which helped him keep his apartment, and describes it as "finder's keepers for other people's houses." His new white neighbors Damian (portrayed by Mikey Day) and Mika (portrayed by Heidi Gardner) from Apartment 7F (where Mister Robinson's friend Frankie used to cook crack) show up asking around if anyone has seen their new HDTV. Mister Robinson acts hostile, claiming they think he stole it just because he's black. They apologize, saying that it's not just him who they are asking. When Damian and Mika invite him to their Christmas party, Mister Robinson angrily declines. After they have left, Mister Robinson teaches the kids the word "Racist", and shows them the HDTV that he has in his apartment, along with a number of stolen packages obtained from porch piracy. When a knock on a door is heard, Mister Robinson shouts to Damian that he doesn't have his TV and can't prove anything. The man states that he is not Damian and is named Patrick (performed offscreen by Chris Redd), and took a DNA test that says that Mister Robinson is his father. Mister Robinson explains that there is a program called 23andMe, which has led to 23 people who took their DNA tests claiming that Mister Robinson is their father. After quoting "Be right there" to Patrick, Mister Robinson silently flees through the fire escape, claiming that he's going to inform the police that a strange black man is banging on his door.

== I Married A Monkey ==
The I Married A Monkey sketches were created by Tim Kazurinsky to remind the viewing public that the show was indeed live. He essentially played himself, working with the premise that he had married a chimpanzee named Madge in a bizarre soap opera world. There was a real chimp on stage, and some sketches featured their "children" played by baby chimps.

Kazurinsky felt that the show had become too polished, and felt that the idea would offer some unpredictability. He explained in Live From New York, "I did it because I knew something would screw up and people would see that it was live. People would ask me 'When do you tape the show?' No, it's called Saturday Night Live. It's live." He eventually decided to put a stop to the sketches when he realized the dangers chimpanzees posed when they got agitated.

=== Episodes Featuring I Married A Monkey ===
Season	Episode	Host	Notes
6	April 11, 1981	None	
7	November 14, 1981	Bernadette Peters	
7	February 6, 1982	James Coburn	
7	May 22, 1982	Olivia Newton-John	
8	March 19, 1983	Robert Guillaume	
9	January 28, 1984	Don Rickles	

== Frank & Papa ==
A Tim Kazurinsky and Tony Rosato sketch. Debuted April 11, 1981.

Preceded by Recurring Saturday Night Live characters and sketches introduced 1979–1980	Recurring Saturday Night Live characters and sketches (listed chronologically)	Succeeded by Recurring Saturday Night Live characters and sketches introduced 1981–1982
