= Saturday Night Live season 9 =

Saturday Night Live
- Season 9
- Starring: Jim Belushi; Robin Duke; Mary Gross; Brad Hall; Tim Kazurinsky; Gary Kroeger; Julia Louis-Dreyfus; Eddie Murphy; Joe Piscopo
- No. of episodes: 19

Release
- Original network: NBC
- Original release: October 8, 1983 – May 12, 1984

Season chronology
- ← Previous season 8 Next → season 10

The ninth season of Saturday Night Live, an American sketch comedy series, originally aired in the United States on NBC between October 8, 1983, and May 12, 1984.

== Hosts ==
Future cast member Billy Crystal hosted twice this season: once with musical guest Al Jarreau and again on the season finale with Ed Koch, Edwin Newman, Betty Thomas and former cast member Don Novello, with the Cars as musical guest.

== Cast ==
Jim Belushi was added to the cast, making his debut on the third episode of the season.

Eddie Murphy's movie schedule got too busy during this season that, in a historic act for the show, he pre-taped a batch of sketches in September of 1983 that were aired throughout the season as if they were live so that he could skip those live shows. Murphy only performed live in eight of the season's 19 episodes, but he appears in new pre-taped sketches that aired in eight episodes he wasn't present for throughout the season. Midway through the season in February, Murphy left the show, but he remained in the opening credits on and off through April for episodes in which his remaining pre-tapes aired.

Brad Hall, who had been anchoring Weekend Update (then called Saturday Night News) since the previous season, left the position in January of 1984. For the rest of the season and into the next, both cast members and SNL guest-hosts would take turns at the anchor chair. Hall himself left SNL at the end of the season.

=== Cast roster ===
Repertory players

- Jim Belushi (first episode: October 22, 1983)
- Robin Duke
- Mary Gross
- **Brad Hall**
- Tim Kazurinsky
- Gary Kroeger
- Julia Louis-Dreyfus
- Eddie Murphy (final episode: April 14, 1984) (Note: Murphy's last episode he appeared in live was the February 25, 1984 episode, but he is still featured in the opening credits after that when he appears in pre-taped sketches through the April 14th episode, when his last pre-tape airs.)
- **Joe Piscopo**

bold denotes Weekend Update anchor

== Writers ==
This season's writers were Jim Belushi, Andy Breckman, Robin Duke, Adam Green, Mary Gross, Nate Herman, Tim Kazurinsky, Kevin Kelton, Andy Kurtzman, Michael McCarthy, Eddie Murphy, Pamela Norris, Margaret Oberman, Joe Piscopo, Andrew Smith, Bob Tischler, Eliot Wald and Herb Sargent (who returned for the last few episodes of the season). The head writers were Bob Tischler and Andrew Smith. Smith then departed after the season finale, after 2½ years since 1982 (this was his only season as head writer).

Besides Murphy, Piscopo, and Duke, this was also the final season for writer Pam Norris, who left the show after four seasons since 1980. Not counting Murphy or Piscopo, Norris was the last writer from the Jean Doumanian-era season to leave the show.

== Episodes ==
| No. overall | No. in season | Host(s) | Musical guest(s) | Original release date |
|---|---|---|---|---|
| 160 | 1 | Brandon Tartikoff | John Cougar Mellencamp | October 8, 1983 |
John Cougar performs "Pink Houses" and "Crumblin' Down".; Cameo appearances by Gene Siskel and Roger Ebert in which they critique the episode's sketches.
| 161 | 2 | Danny DeVito and Rhea Perlman | Eddy Grant | October 15, 1983 |
Eddy Grant performs "I Don't Wanna Dance", "Electric Avenue" and "Living on the Front Line".; Dick Cavett made a cameo appearance in the Autograph Hounds sketch.
| 162 | 3 | John Candy | Men at Work | October 22, 1983 |
Men at Work performs "Dr. Heckyll & Mr. Jive" and "It's a Mistake".; Jim Belushi's first episode as a cast member.
| 163 | 4 | Betty Thomas | Stray Cats | November 5, 1983 |
Eddie Murphy did not perform live in this show. He pre-taped two sketches before the season started that aired during this show.; Stray Cats perform "(She's) Sexy + 17" and "I Won't Stand in Your Way", the latter of which featured a cameo appearance by 14 Karat Soul.; Eddie Murphy performs one of SNL's most iconic sketches, "James Brown's Celebrity Hot Tub Party". In a tease before the break, James Brown is seen in the hot tub with Dr. Joyce Brothers.
| 164 | 5 | Teri Garr | Mick Fleetwood's Zoo | November 12, 1983 |
Eddie Murphy did not perform live in this show. He pre-taped two sketches before the season started that aired during this show.; Mick Fleetwood's Zoo performs "Tonight" and "Way Down".; Magician and future creator/star of Mystery Science Theater 3000 Joel Hodgson made a guest appearance.; Jim Belushi was not present nor credited for this episode due to performing in a play, True West.
| 165 | 6 | Jerry Lewis | Loverboy | November 19, 1983 |
Loverboy performs "Working for the Weekend".; Florence Henderson made a cameo appearance during the "What Famous Person Do You Look Like?" short film.
| 166 | 7 | The Smothers Brothers | Big Country | December 3, 1983 |
Eddie Murphy did not perform live in this show. He pre-taped one sketch before the season started that aired during this show.; Big Country performs "In a Big Country" and "Fields of Fire".; Larry Holmes made a cameo appearance during Saturday Night News.; Cameo appearances by Ron Luciano and Tom Seaver in the cold open, and Luciano also appears in the autograph sketch.
| 167 | 8 | Flip Wilson | Stevie Nicks | December 10, 1983 |
Stevie Nicks performs "Stand Back" and "Nightbird".; Guest appearance by Joel Hodgson.; Brad Hall's last episode anchoring Saturday Night News.
| 168 | 9 | Father Guido Sarducci | Huey Lewis and the News | January 14, 1984 |
Eddie Murphy did not perform live in this show. He pre-taped two sketches before the season started that aired during this show.; Huey Lewis and the News performs "Heart and Soul" and "I Want a New Drug".; Guest appearance by stand-up comedian Steven Wright.; With Sarducci being portrayed by Don Novello, this episode marks the first time a fictional character ever hosted Saturday Night Live.
| 169 | 10 | Michael and Mary Palin | The Motels | January 21, 1984 |
Eddie Murphy did not perform live in this show. He pre-taped one sketch before the season started that aired during this show.; The Motels perform "Suddenly Last Summer" and "Remember the Nights".; Though credited as the episode's co-host, Mary Palin (Michael's mother) only appears during the opening monologue.
| 170 | 11 | Don Rickles | Billy Idol | January 28, 1984 |
Eddie Murphy did not perform live in this show. He pre-taped one sketch before the season started that aired during this show.; Billy Idol performs "White Wedding" and "Rebel Yell".; Cameo appearances by Brandon Tartikoff and John Madden during the monologue as members of the audience.; Dr. Joyce Brothers appears in the "Fascinating People and Their Friends" sketch.; Don Rickles repeatedly ad-libs extra lines and gestures throughout his sketches (mostly with Joe Piscopo), causing other cast members to break character, and a few sketches even include improvised face-slapping competitions.; An off-screen Dave Wilson talks to Rickles during the monologue.
| 171 | 12 | Robin Williams | Adam Ant | February 11, 1984 |
Adam Ant performs "Strip" and "Goody Two Shoes".; Stand-up comedian Paula Poundstone made a guest appearance.
| 172 | 13 | Jamie Lee Curtis | The Fixx | February 18, 1984 |
The Fixx performs "One Thing Leads to Another" and "Red Skies".; Joel Hodgson made a guest appearance.
| 173 | 14 | Edwin Newman | Kool & the Gang | February 25, 1984 |
Kool & the Gang performs "Joanna" and "Celebration".; Magician Harry Anderson made a guest appearance.; Eddie Murphy's final live show as a cast member.
| 174 | 15 | Billy Crystal | Al Jarreau | March 17, 1984 |
Eddie Murphy did not perform live in this show. He pre-taped one sketch before the season started that aired during this show.; Al Jarreau performs "Mornin'" and "Trouble in Paradise".; Cameo appearance by New York City mayor Ed Koch during the cold open.; Billy Crystal debuts his Fernando character.
| 175 | 16 | Michael Douglas | Deniece Williams | April 7, 1984 |
Deniece Williams performs "Let's Hear It for the Boy" and "Wrapped Up".; Michael Douglas anchors Saturday Night News.; The Garage Band (Larry, Riff and Cliff) plays their new tune and subsequent video Look at Our Video on the sketch MTV News.; First episode where Eddie Murphy is not credited as a cast member nor appears.; The Look at Our Video videoclip ended up being played for real on rotation by MTV itself.
| 176 | 17 | George McGovern | Madness | April 14, 1984 |
Eddie Murphy did not perform live in this show. He pre-taped one sketch before the season started that aired during this show.; Madness performs "Our House" and "Keep Moving".; Cameo appearance by Frankie Pace to perform his stand-up set.; Cameo appearance by Clara Peller (from the "Where's the Beef?" commercial) in the "White House Foods" commercial parody to say her catchphrase.; Eddie Murphy's final episode as a cast member (via pre-recorded sketch).
| 177 | 18 | Barry Bostwick | Spinal Tap | May 5, 1984 |
Spinal Tap performs "Christmas with the Devil" and "Big Bottom", and appears in a filmed interview with Bostwick. Future cast member Michael McKean was a member of the spoof rock group.; Cameo appearance by Billy Crystal during Saturday Night News as Fernando Lamas; Future cast member A. Whitney Brown performed his stand-up set.; A cameo appearance by Soupy Sales during the Turkey Lady sketch.
| 178 | 19 | Billy Crystal, Ed Koch, Edwin Newman, Father Guido Sarducci, Betty Thomas | The Cars | May 12, 1984 |
The Cars performs "Magic" and "Drive".; Guest appearance by Joel Hodgson.; Robin Duke, Brad Hall, Tim Kazurinsky and Joe Piscopo's final episode as cast members.
