= Recurring Saturday Night Live characters and sketches introduced 1981–82 =

The following is a list of recurring Saturday Night Live characters and sketches introduced between October 3, 1981, and May 22, 1982, the seventh season of SNL.

== Tyrone Green, Prose and Cons ==
An Eddie Murphy sketch. Debuted October 3, 1981.

== A Few Minutes with Andy Rooney ==
A parody of the "A Few Minutes with Andy Rooney" segments on the newsmagazine TV program 60 Minutes with Joe Piscopo impersonating Andy Rooney. Debuted October 3, 1981.

Appearances

Season	Episode	Host	Notes
7	October 3, 1981	none	"Shoes"
7	October 17, 1981	George Kennedy	"A few minutes with the Rooneys"
7	January 23, 1982	Robert Conrad	"Breasts"
8	February 5, 1983	Sid Caesar	"Book Review"

== The Bizarro World ==
A parody of the world of the same name featured in DC Comics, the sketch features characters who all have big ears and speak with a vocoded effect on their voices and everyone does the complete opposite (e.g.: "Goodbye" is "Hello" and vice versa)

List of appearances:

- October 10, 1981 "Bizzaro President" (Host: Susan Saint James)
- February 20, 1982 "Bizarro Broadcasting Company" (Host: Bruce Dern)

== Buckwheat ==
The Our Gang character of Buckwheat, portrayed as an adult by Eddie Murphy, sang current hits in garbled speech. His first appearance, on October 10, 1981, was in a commercial parody for an album titled, Buh-Weet Sings. Right before each song, subtitles on the screen would list the title, spelled phonetically exactly as Buckwheat would say it (example: "Lookin' for Love" became "Wookin' Pa Nub" and "Three Times a Lady" became "Fee Tines a Mady"). One song, "Bette Davis Eyes" is so poorly pronounced that the superimposed title is "???". Those who wanted to purchase the album were instructed to send money to "Bah Firty Fee, New Nork, New Nork".

The character was also the central focus of a series of sketches called "Who Shot Buckwheat?", which parodied the then-recent TV coverage of assassinations and attempted assassinations of public figures, such as the attempted assassination of President Ronald Reagan and the murder of John Lennon, as well as the "Who Shot J.R.?" storyline on the television series Dallas.

Appearances

Season	Episode	Host	Notes
7	October 10, 1981	Susan Saint James	Buh-Weet Sings
7	December 5, 1981	Tim Curry	
7	January 30, 1982	John Madden	
7	March 20, 1982	Robert Urich	
8	November 13, 1982	Robert Blake	
8	March 12, 1983	Bruce Dern	Who Shot Buckwheat?
8	March 19, 1983	Robert Guillaume	
8	April 9, 1983	Joan Rivers	
9	October 22, 1983	John Candy	
9	January 14, 1984	Father Guido Sarducci	Taped September 1983
10	December 15, 1984	Eddie Murphy	
45	December 21, 2019	Eddie Murphy	The Masked Singer

== Paulette Clooney ==
A Robin Duke sketch. Debuted October 10, 1981.

Appearances

Season	Episode	Host	Notes
7	October 10, 1981	Susan Saint James	
7	January 23, 1982	Robert Conrad	
7	May 22, 1982	Olivia Newton-John	

== Velvet Jones ==
Eddie Murphy plays an entrepreneurial pimp and author of the book "I Wanna Be A Ho".

Debuted on October 17, 1981.

Appearances

Season	Episode	Host	Notes
7	October 17, 1981	George Kennedy	
7	November 7, 1981	Lauren Hutton	
7	January 23, 1982	Robert Conrad	
8	October 9, 1982	Ron Howard	
8	April 16, 1983	Susan Saint James	
45	December 21, 2019	Eddie Murphy	Appeared on "Black Jeopardy"

== Vic Salukin ==
A Tony Rosato sketch. Debuted October 31, 1981.

== Pudge & Solomon ==
In this 1980s sketch, two grizzled barflies were played by Joe Piscopo and Eddie Murphy. Piscopo's character played the piano. Debuted January 30, 1982.

Appearances

Season	Episode	Host	Notes
7	January 30, 1982	John Madden	
7	May 15, 1982	Danny DeVito	
8	December 4, 1982	The Smothers Brothers	
8	January 22, 1983	Lily Tomlin	
8	March 19, 1983	Robert Guillaume	
9	December 10, 1983	Flip Wilson	

== Dr. Jack Badofsky ==
Dr. Jack Badofsky was played by Tim Kazurinsky in a series of appearances on SNL Newsbreak or Saturday Night News (the monikers for Weekend Update during the Ebersol years). The doctor would inform the audience about different strains of diseases like influenza or rabies, and each strain would be a rhyming pun (i.e. "Should you be bitten by an ownerless dog, that’s Straybies, and a foaming French poodle can give you Qu'est-ce Que-C'estbies"). Badofsky stuttered in a timid, wavering tone, suggesting the sort of "ultra uptight" and extremely introverted character he was supposed to be, when thrust into the spotlight. There is, indeed, a real Jack Badofsky. He collaborated with Kazurinsky in writing the sketches and—as a nod to Badofsky—Kazurinsky named the character after him. At the time, Badofsky headed up Smith, Badofsky & Raffel, a Chicago ad agency known for Badofsky's humorous radio commercials. Badofsky also has written many essays and humor for newspapers and magazines as well a material performed on the stage and TV.

Appearances

Season	Episode	Host	Notes
7	February 27, 1982	Elizabeth Ashley	
7	March 20, 1982	Robert Urich	
7	April 17, 1982	Johnny Cash	
7	May 15, 1982	Danny DeVito	
8	October 2, 1982	Louis Gossett Jr.	
8	November 13, 1982	Robert Blake	
8	December 11, 1982	Eddie Murphy	
8	February 5, 1983	Sid Caesar	
8	March 12, 1983	Bruce Dern	
8	May 7, 1983	Stevie Wonder	
9	October 22, 1983	John Candy	
9	December 3, 1983	The Smothers Brothers	
9	January 21, 1984	Michael Palin	
9	May 12, 1984	Ed Koch, Betty Thomas, Father Guido Sarducci, Edwin Newman, Billy Crystal	

== Gumby ==
Eddie Murphy impersonates the green clay character Gumby. Debuted March 27, 1982. This was the origin of the catch-phrase "I'm Gumby, dammit!", which has been called one of the show's "best catchphrases".

Appearances

Season	Episode	Host	Notes
7	March 27, 1982	Blythe Danner	
8	September 25, 1982	Chevy Chase	
8	December 11, 1982	Eddie Murphy	Merry Christmas, Dammit!
8	March 12, 1983	Bruce Dern	Competition
8	May 14, 1983	Ed Koch	
9	October 8, 1983	Brandon Tartikoff	Gumby and Pokey Reunite
9	November 5, 1983	Betty Thomas	The Gumby Story Film. Taped September 1983
10	December 15, 1984	Eddie Murphy	
45	December 21, 2019	Eddie Murphy	Weekend Update feature.

== The Whiners ==
Joe Piscopo, playing Doug Whiner, and Robin Duke, playing Wendy Whiner, speak all their lines in a whining, nasal tone, hence, a double meaning of their name. They both claim to suffer from diverticulitis, and neither eats anything but macaroni and cheese.

In 1998, writer Stanley Ribbles, in a Turner-Allan magazine article, said this of "The Whiners":

We weren't thinking, 'Hey, let's make characters that our audience is going to despise.' But we did like Joe [Piscopo] a lot for some reason, and we wanted to give him more air-time.... At the end of the night, you have the options of staying up or going to bed. We had a glass of milk and watched television.

Appearances

Season	Episode	Host	Notes
7	April 10, 1982	Daniel J. Travanti	"Whiners Anniversary"
7	May 15, 1982	Danny DeVito	"The Whiners on a Plane"
8	October 9, 1982	Ron Howard	"The Whiners at the Doctor"
8	November 20, 1982	Drew Barrymore	"Whiners Adoption"
8	January 29, 1983	Rick Moranis, Dave Thomas	"The Whiners Taken Hostage"
8	February 5, 1983	Sid Caesar	"The Whiners in the Hospital"
8	April 9, 1983	Joan Rivers	"The Whiners at SNL"
8	May 14, 1983	Ed Koch	"Whiner in the War"
9	October 8, 1983	Brandon Tartikoff	"Whiner Show Ideas"
9	May 5, 1984	Barry Bostwick	"2 On The Town"

Preceded by Recurring Saturday Night Live characters and sketches introduced 1980–81	Recurring Saturday Night Live characters and sketches (listed chronologically)	Succeeded by Recurring Saturday Night Live characters and sketches introduced 1982–83
