= Saturday Night Live season 7 =

Saturday Night Live
- Season 7
- Starring: Robin Duke; Christine Ebersole; Mary Gross; Tim Kazurinsky; Eddie Murphy; Joe Piscopo; Tony Rosato; Brian Doyle-Murray
- No. of episodes: 20

Release
- Original network: NBC
- Original release: October 3, 1981 – May 22, 1982

Season chronology
- ← Previous season 6 Next → season 8

The seventh season of Saturday Night Live, an American sketch comedy series, originally aired in the United States on NBC between October 3, 1981, and May 22, 1982. It was the first full season produced by Dick Ebersol.

== History ==
New cast members for the 1981 season included Christine Ebersole, Mary Gross, and 1979 featured player Brian Doyle-Murray, who ran the Weekend Update (under the title Saturday Night Live Newsbreak & Current Affairs) desk for one season. Also returning were Second City veterans Robin Duke, Tim Kazurinsky, and Tony Rosato, who had debuted April 11.

Ebersol ran a very different show to that Lorne Michaels had in the 1970s. Many of the sketches were built less on "smart" and "revolutionary" comedy that was abundant in the early days and followed a much more "straightforward" approach. This shift alienated some fans and even some writers and cast members. Ebersol was eager to attract the younger viewers that advertisers craved. He dictated that no sketch should run longer than five minutes, so as not to lose the attention of teenagers.

Having come from the ranks of management, Ebersol was adept at dealing with the network. Ebersol was also not fond of political humor, and he and NBC mostly eschewed jokes about President Reagan during his time as showrunner. Later in his tenure, he was handling much of the business aspects and day-to-day production affairs, leaving producer Bob Tischler in charge of most of the creative facets of the show.

Unlike Michaels, Ebersol had no difficulty firing people. Among the first casualties after the 1981 season were Rosato (who later said that the firing was the best thing to ever happen to him, as he felt that the show's atmosphere encouraged his drug addiction) and Ebersole, who got the axe because of her frequent complaints that the women on the show had little airtime and what they did receive cast them in sexist and humiliating light. Michael O'Donoghue was fired in December 1981, after repeated arguments with Ebersol over the creative direction of the show, and because of his abusive treatment of the cast.

=== Murphy's rise ===
Joe Piscopo and Eddie Murphy were the only performers from Doumanian's cast to appear on SNL for season seven. Murphy, who had already emerged as a breakout star on Doumanian's season, continued to thrive under Ebersol, and his soaring popularity helped restore the show's ratings. He created memorable characters, including the empty-headed former child movie star Buckwheat and an irascible, life-size version of the Gumby toy character, complete with life-size star ego. Piscopo was also popular, renowned for his Frank Sinatra impersonation, as well as his character Paulie Herman.

== Cast ==
After the end of the previous season, which was cut short because of the 1981 Writers Guild of America strike, Ebersol dismissed two more of Jean Doumanian's hires, repertory players Denny Dillon and Gail Matthius. Featured players Laurie Metcalf and Emily Prager, who were hired for and credited in the previous season's final episode (though Metcalf only appeared in a pre-recorded piece, and Prager didn't appear at all), were not asked back as cast members. Prager would appear, however, as an uncredited participant in a short film in this season's second episode.

The new cast of Saturday Night Live for season 7 included returning veterans Robin Duke, Tim Kazurinsky, Tony Rosato, Eddie Murphy and Joe Piscopo. Two new cast members were added: Second City alum Mary Gross and Broadway actress Christine Ebersole. Writer Brian Doyle-Murray joined as a featured player after a brief stint as a cast member during the show's fifth season. Doyle-Murray became the new Weekend Update (then called SNL Newsbreak) host, and was teamed first with Mary Gross before anchoring solo for three months, then back again with Gross for one more month. For the remainder of the season, Doyle-Murray was paired with Christine Ebersole.

Murphy, who had already emerged as a cast breakout last season, continued to rise in popularity in season 7 and Ebersol heavily featured both Murphy and Piscopo in the show.

=== Cast roster ===
**Repertory players**

- Robin Duke
- **Christine Ebersole**
- **Mary Gross**
- Tim Kazurinsky
- Eddie Murphy
- Joe Piscopo
- Tony Rosato

**Featured players**

- **Brian Doyle-Murray**

bold denotes Weekend Update anchor

As the anchor of SNL Newsbreak, and unusual with featured players in the early years, Doyle-Murray was credited in every single episode of the season.

During the season, original cast member John Belushi died of an overdose of heroin and cocaine. Doyle-Murray paid tribute to Belushi before the goodnights on the Robert Urich hosted episode on March 20, 1982.

== Writers ==
The only writers brought back from the previous season were Barry Blaustein, Pamela Norris, David Sheffield, and Brian Doyle-Murray; as well as Michael O'Donoghue and Bob Tischler (who were hired at the end of the previous season), who were named as this season's head writers.

O'Donoghue, whom Ebersol brought back to the show in March, remained as head writer for the first half of season 7. Some sketches, as well as the appearances of artists like Fear and William S. Burroughs, reflected the increasingly bizarre ideas O'Donoghue had for the show. However, after developing a tense relationship with Ebersol and berating the cast in a meeting following the December 12 episode, O'Donoghue was fired, with Bob Tischler becoming the sole head writer.

New writers included Joe Bodolai, Nate Herman, Nelson Lyon, Mark O’Donnell, Margaret Oberman, Andrew Smith, Terry Southern and Eliot Wald

This season's writers were Barry W. Blaustein, Joe Bodolai, Brian Doyle-Murray, Nate Herman, Tim Kazurinsky, Nelson Lyon, Maryilyn Suzanne Miller (episodes 1–13), Pamela Norris, (episodes 1–15; she would return next season) Mark O'Donnell, Michael O'Donoghue, Margaret Oberman, Tony Rosato, David Sheffield, Rosie Shuster, Andrew Smith, Terry Southern, Bob Tischler and Eliot Wald. The head writers were Michael O'Donoghue (episodes 1–8) and Bob Tischler. This was Doyle-Murray's final season as a writer, after 4½ years since 1978.

== Episodes ==
No. overall	No. in season	Host(s)	Musical guest(s)	Original release date
120	1	(none)	Rod Stewart	October 3, 1981
Rod Stewart performs "She Won't Dance with Me", "Young Turks" and "Hot Legs" (the latter with Tina Turner).; James Caan was supposed to host this episode but had to drop out due to his sister having bone marrow cancer.; Guest appearance by Michael Davis.; A short film made by Yoko Ono is presented.; Contains the "Little Richard Simmons Show" sketch.; Christine Ebersole and Mary Gross' first episode as cast members.; Brian Doyle-Murray rejoins the cast after a one-year hiatus.; Mel Brandt's first episode as announcer.
121	2	Susan Saint James	The Kinks	October 10, 1981
The Kinks perform "Destroyer" and "Art Lover".; Christine Ebersole performed "Single Women", a song written by head writer Michael O'Donoghue.; Eddie Murphy debuts his Buckwheat character.; This episode features a film by Andy Aaron called Push Button to Explode Building with Tom Davis and Emily Prager.; This episode also features Sadat, a film by John Fox.; Brian McConnachie plays the title character in another film, Let's See What's Bothering Bob.; Contains the Bizarro World sketch "Bizarro President" which features Joe Piscopo as Ronald Reagan.
122	3	George Kennedy	Miles Davis	October 17, 1981
Miles Davis performs "Jean Pierre".; Ron Howard and Regis Philbin appear in the cold open as contestants.; John Candy appears as Juan Gavino during the SNL Newsbreak segment.; A stand up and magic routine by Harry Anderson.; Final appearance of Mr. Bill in a new short film, which this time, he moves to Los Angeles.; First appearance of Velvet Jones.
123	4	Donald Pleasence	Fear	October 31, 1981
Fear performs "I Don't Care About You", "Beef Bologna", "New York's Alright If You Like Saxophones" and "Let's Have a War". Shortly after beginning "Let's Have a War," the group was cut off by a repeat of the filmed piece "Prose and Cons" previously shown on October 3.; In the cold opening, Donald Pleasence rehearses the "Live from New York, it's Saturday Night" announcement in a men's restroom, (the only time the line was used for the 7th season) until Eddie Murphy shows up to suggest that Pleasence vomit for luck. After Murphy leaves the bathroom, John Belushi appears from the other stall, stares into the camera, and says nothing.; Guest appearance by Michael Davis.; Neil Levy plays the corpse in the "I'm So Miserable" sketch.
124	5	Lauren Hutton	Rick James	November 7, 1981
Rick James performs "Give It to Me Baby" and "Super Freak".; Beat-generation writer William S. Burroughs makes a guest appearance, performing spoken word.
125	6	Bernadette Peters	The Go-Go's; Billy Joel	November 14, 1981
The Go-Gos perform "Our Lips Are Sealed" and "We Got the Beat".; Billy Joel performs "Miami 2017 (Seen the Lights Go Out on Broadway)" and "She's Got a Way", live from a Manhattan recording studio.; Bernadette Peters opens with a parody of a U.S. Army hygiene film as Betty Boop in Johnny Keep Your Gun Clean.; Peters also performs a song filled with masturbation innuendo called "Making Love Alone".
126	7	Tim Curry	Meat Loaf	December 5, 1981
Meat Loaf performs "Promised Land" and "Bat Out of Hell".; The Rocky Horror Picture Show co-stars Curry and Meat Loaf appeared in a parody sketch where they sell chintzy "Rocky Horror"-related merchandise.; Frank Nelson cameos in the "Mick!" variety special sketch.; Bill Hanrahan fills in for Mel Brandt as announcer.
127	8	Bill Murray	The Spinners; The Whiffenpoofs	December 12, 1981
The Spinners performs a medley of "Then Came You", "I'll Be Around" and "Working My Way Back to You".; Bill Murray delivers a short monologue about Santa and introduces "Saint Nick".; The Whiffenpoofs performs a medley of Christmas songs with Bill Murray and the SNL cast.; Guest appearances by Michael Davis and Father Guido Sarducci.; Bill Hanrahan fills in for Mel Brandt as announcer.; A young Fred Stoller makes an uncredited appearance as an extra in the first sketch.; A very young Seth Green appears as one of the children Mary Gross interviews during her segment on SNL Newsbreak; The live East Coast feed of the show is momentarily interrupted by breaking news from NBC News over Poland declaring a state of emergency. The feed rejoins the show during the sketch At Home with the Psychos.
128	9	Robert Conrad	The Allman Brothers Band	January 23, 1982
The Allman Brothers Band performs "Midnight Rider", "Southbound", and "One Way Out".
129	10	John Madden	Jennifer Holliday	January 30, 1982
Jennifer Holliday performs "And I Am Telling You I'm Not Going" and "One Night Only".; Andy Kaufman makes a special guest appearance as Elvis Presley.
130	11	James Coburn	Lindsey Buckingham	February 6, 1982
Lindsey Buckingham performs "Bwana" and "Trouble".; Guest appearance by Marc Weiner.
131	12	Bruce Dern	Luther Vandross	February 20, 1982
Luther Vandross performs "Never Too Much" and "A House Is Not a Home".; Bruce Dern appears in a surreal and dark parody of The Wild One called "The Mild One".; Among those interviewed in the "Who Do You Hate?" film is theatre critic/historian Peter Filichia.; Contains the second and final Bizarro World sketch "Bizarro Broadcasting Company" which pokes fun at NBC which was in last place Among the big three.
132	13	Elizabeth Ashley	Hall & Oates	February 27, 1982
Hall & Oates performs "You Make My Dreams", "I Can't Go for That (No Can Do)" and "You've Lost That Lovin' Feelin'".; Harry Anderson performed a stand up and magic routine.
133	14	Robert Urich	Mink DeVille	March 20, 1982
Mink DeVille performs "Maybe Tomorrow" and "Love & Emotion".; Brian Doyle-Murray gives tribute to John Belushi, who died two weeks before this show aired, at the episode's conclusion.
134	15	Blythe Danner	Rickie Lee Jones	March 27, 1982
Rickie Lee Jones performs "Pirates (So Long Lonely Avenue)", "Lush Life" and "Woody and Dutch On the Slow Train to Peking".; Guest appearance by Michael Davis.; First appearance of Eddie Murphy as Gumby.
135	16	Daniel J. Travanti	John Cougar Mellencamp	April 10, 1982
John Cougar Mellencamp performs "Hurts So Good" and "Ain't Even Done with the Night".; Daniel J. Travanti's Hill Street Blues co-star Bruce Weitz appeared in a Hill Street parody.; There's a recurring sketch throughout the episode in which viewers at home can phone-in to decide whether Larry the Lobster lives or is killed.; First appearance of The Whiners.
136	17	Johnny Cash	Elton John	April 17, 1982
Elton John performs "Empty Garden" and "Ball & Chain".; Johnny Cash performs "Man in Black", "I Walk the Line", "Folsom Prison Blues", "Ring of Fire" and "Sunday Mornin' Comin' Down".
137	18	Robert Culp	The Charlie Daniels Band	April 24, 1982
The Charlie Daniels Band performs "Still in Saigon" and "The Devil Went Down to Georgia".
138	19	Danny DeVito	Sparks	May 15, 1982
Sparks performs "I Predict" and "Mickey Mouse", the latter with an introductory monologue by Ron Mael, from its album Angst in My Pants.; During his monologue, Danny DeVito brings his castmates from Taxi for a farewell bow after ABC canceled the show (NBC later picked up the sitcom).; Danny DeVito appeared in a film where he blew up the ABC corporate headquarters.; Andy Kaufman appeared to apologize for wrestling women.
139	20	Olivia Newton-John	Olivia Newton-John	May 22, 1982
Olivia Newton-John performs "Physical", "Make a Move on Me" and "Landslide".; Guest appearance by Michael Davis.; Guest Graham Chapman appears in several sketches and in the SNL NewsBreak with a humorous promotion for the new movie The Secret Policeman's Other Ball.; Brian Doyle-Murray, Christine Ebersole and Tony Rosato’s final episode as cast members.; Mel Brandt's last episode as announcer.
