= Picture Paris =

- Directed by: Brad Hall
- Written by: Brad Hall
- Starring: Julia Louis-Dreyfus, Grégory Fitoussi
- Release date: 17 December 2012

Picture Paris is a 2012 HBO short film about a suburban woman with an empty nest who exhibits a passion for Paris.

== Production ==
The film was written and directed by Brad Hall, starred Julia Louis-Dreyfus and Grégory Fitoussi and was shot in Paris in May and June 2011.

== Release ==
Picture Paris had a screening at The Wilmette Theatre, Wilmette, Illinois on New Year's Day 2012. Picture Paris premiered on 17 December 2012 at 9PM, on HBO. It was entered into the 2012 Tribeca Film Festival.
