= Women Fully Clothed =

Canadian comedy troupe

Women Fully Clothed is a Canadian live sketch comedy troupe composed of four women. The group performs original sketch comedy and tours internationally.

== Cast ==
Sources:

- Kathy Greenwood (Whose Line Is It Anyway?, This Hour Has 22 Minutes)
- Robin Duke (Saturday Night Live, SCTV)
- Jayne Eastwood (My Big Fat Greek Wedding, This Is Wonderland)
- Teresa Pavlinek (History Bites, The Jane Show)

== History ==
Women Fully Clothed was conceived by Robin Duke in 2003 and was originally commissioned for a Second City fundraiser in support of Women Against Violence. Following the success of the initial performance, the troupe developed a full-length show and began touring across North America.

The original lineup included five performers. Debra McGrath (Getting Along Famously) departed the group in early 2009, after which the troupe continued as a four-member ensemble.

In May 2010, Women Fully Clothed premiered its second production, Older and Hotter, with its Toronto debut at Massey Hall. The production was performed by the four-member lineup and marked a new phase in the group's touring repertoire.

The troupe continued touring with Older and Hotter through the early 2010s, including performances leading up to appearances at major comedy festivals.

Following a hiatus during the COVID-19 pandemic, Women Fully Clothed resumed live performances in 2024 with a revival tour across Canada and the United States. The group described the run as a “first farewell tour,” featuring a compilation of material from its previous productions. Due to demand, performances were expanded in several cities due to demand, and the troupe continued to tour into 2025.

== Performance and style ==
Most performances run approximately 90 minutes, though show lengths may vary depending on venue and format. The troupe's sketches focus on themes drawn from everyday life, particularly experiences and perspectives associated with women, presented through scripted scenes and musical numbers, often with a "comedic" twist.

During performances, cast members often clarify that the material is not intended as male-bashing. While audiences are predominantly female, men are encouraged to attend.

The show is directed by John Hemphill.

== Recognition ==
Women Fully Clothed was featured in the 2006 Just for Laughs comedy festival in Montreal, Quebec. They troupe was also nominated for Best Sketch Troupe at the 6th Annual Canadian Comedy Awards in 2005.

Actor and comedian Eugene Levy described the group as "the five funniest women in Canada."
