= The Moleman of Belmont Avenue =

- Directed by: Mike Bradecich, John LaFlamboy
- Written by: Mike Bradecich, John LaFlamboy
- Starring: Justin DiGiacomo, Mike Bradecich, John LaFlamboy
- Cinematography: Michael N.J. Wright
- Edited by: Mike Bradecich, Dustin Foster
- Music by: Devin Delaney
- Production companies: Big Tree Productions, Resolution Digital Studios
- Distributed by: Level 33 Entertainment
- Release date: June 2011 (Another Hole in the Head)
- Running time: 90 minutes
- Country: United States
- Language: English

The Moleman of Belmont Avenue is a 2011 American comedy horror film that was written and directed by Mike Bradecich and John LaFlamboy, who also starred. The film premiered in 2011 and was released to DVD on September 10, 2013.

== Synopsis ==
The film opens with Marion (Mike Bradecich) unsuccessfully trying to persuade some tenants to remain in his run-down apartment building. The tenants' complaints stem from several issues, including the building's heat and power getting shut off and Marion stealing power from a nearby church. During this time Marion's brother Jarmon (John LaFlamboy) returns home from his latest get rich quick scheme, which has failed like all of his other attempts. The two brothers are bombarded by complaints from their tenants, mainly centering on the building's rundown state and the disappearance of everyone's pets.

The brothers discover that the pets have been taken by a "moleman" (Justin DiGiacomo) that has been eating the pets one by one. They launch a series of attempts to deter the moleman but ultimately end up failing to stop the creature from eating all of the building's pets. During this time they also end up making enemies of two local police officers. With the pet population depleted, Marion and Jarmon were hoping that the moleman would move on but soon find that it has begun to attack the building's occupants. They manage to initially stop the moleman from taking the elderly Mrs. Habershackle (Mary Seibel) but it returns to her apartment later and succeeds in taking her. Marion comes up with the idea of choosing specific occupants to feed to the creature to save the others, particularly the beautiful bartender that operates the bar beneath the building. This horrifies Jarmon and he tries to stop Marion, resulting in the moleman charging at them. They're saved at the last minute by Dave (David Pasquesi), a hermit living in one of the apartments and Marion's first choice to feed to the moleman.

Dave informs the two that the moleman had been around for years and had tried to attack him back when the building had been run by the brothers' mother. The only reason that the moleman had not waged such a wide attack on the building had been due to the building's heating system running and blocking off the moleman's route into the building (as he was using several underground prohibition-era bootlegging tunnels), but since the power had been shut off the moleman was able to freely access the building. Having had enough, they decide to take on the moleman and inform the building's occupants of everything that has happened. They go into the basement and succeed in killing the moleman, but discover that there wasn't one moleman but many. They barely manage to escape and light a fire in the heating system, blocking the mole men from pursuing them. The film then cuts forward to an undetermined point in time, where the two brothers have begun taking their jobs as landlords more seriously. They inform some new tenants that they must pay for all utilities except heat, as they run the heater year round due to the building being "drafty" (they do not inform them that it is actually done to keep mole men out of the building). The film ends with the two brothers going downstairs to respond to a warning by an alarm system that goes off whenever a moleman tries to come in through the heating system.

== Cast ==
- Justin DiGiacomo as Moleman
- Mike Bradecich as Marion Mugg
- John LaFlamboy as Jarmon Mugg
- Nicholas Barron as Nicholas
- Cat Bernier as Abby
- Brian Boland as Adrian
- Paul Clayton as Clown the Stoner
- Dana DeLorenzo as Stoner Molly
- Robert Englund as Hezekiah Confab
- Dina Facklis as Catherine
- Noah Gregoropoulos as The Trick
- Greg Hollimon as Robert the Cop
- T.J. Jagodowski as Paulie
- Dan Jessup as Cat Box Daddy
- Tim Kazurinsky as Harold
- Mary Seibel as Mrs. Habershackle
- David Pasquesi as Dave the Hermit

== Reception ==
Critical reception for The Moleman of Belmont Avenue has been mixed. The Oklahoma Gazette and DVD Verdict both panned the film, and DVD Verdict wrote that "The Moleman of Belmont Avenue didn't inspire laughs. Instead, I just wanted it to end." Variety commented that "Progress is consistently amusing if seldom hilarious; momentum occasionally slackens" but that the film had its "cult-following credentials in order" by way of its cast members. Dread Central and Bloody Disgusting both praised the film, and Bloody Disgusting stated that "With great chemistry fueling the creators, the movie is definitely worth checking out."
