= Mary Gross =

American voice actress (born 1953)

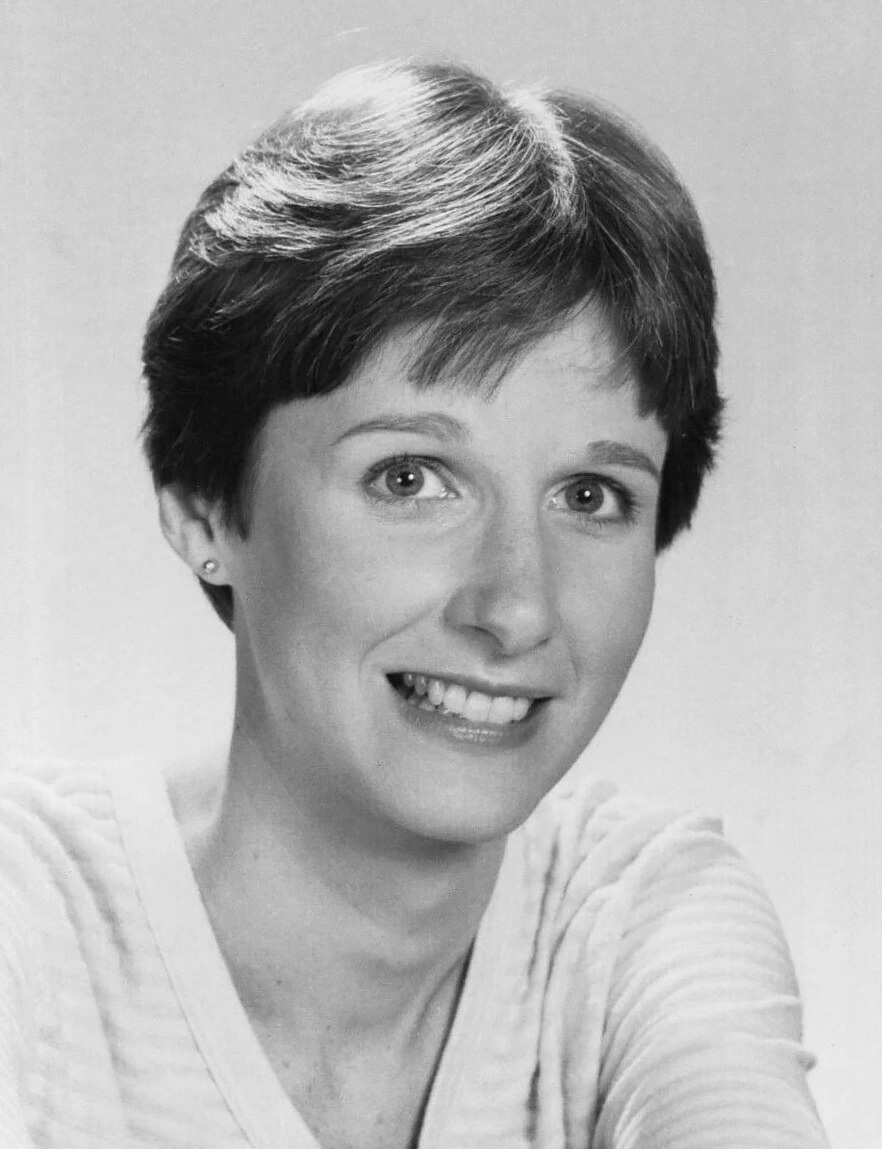
- Gross, c. 1981
- Born: March 25, 1953 (age 73); Chicago, Illinois, U.S.
- Occupations: Actress, comedian, voice actress
- Years active: 1980–2012
- Relatives: Michael Gross (brother); Ron Masak (cousin)

Mary Gross (born March 25, 1953) is an American actress and comedian known for her four-year stint on Saturday Night Live from 1981 to 1985 and her recurring role as Sabrina Spellman (Melissa Joan Hart)'s favorite teacher, Mrs. Quick in Sabrina, the Teenage Witch from 1997 to 2000. Her credits also include roles on Animaniacs, Boston Legal, That's So Raven and Six Feet Under.

== Early life ==
Gross was born in Chicago, Illinois in 1953. She is the youngest of three children born to William Oscar Gross, a tool designer, and Virginia Ruth (née Cahill), a telephone operator (the eldest being actor Michael Gross). She attended Madonna High School—an all-girls Catholic school, since demolished—and Loyola University, where she majored in English. While in high school, Gross made her performing debut—singing, in character, as France's Louis XIV, to the tune of Leonard Bernstein and Stephen Sondheim's "I Feel Pretty"—alongside fellow Madonna alumna Marilu Henner. Gross worked for five years as a secretary for the American Dental Association.

== Career ==
=== Early career ===
Gross answered an ad for a comedy workshop for the Reification Company, where she went to learn about writing comedy sketches. While there, she ended up performing and soon began performing in local productions. In 1979, she joined the Second City comedy troupe.

=== Saturday Night Live (1981–1985) ===
Gross joined Saturday Night Live in 1981, during the show's seventh season, which was retooled extensively after the sixth season proved a critical failure. She became co-anchor with Brian Doyle-Murray of the Weekend Update segment (renamed SNL Newsbreak) during her first season. She and the rest of the cast left in 1985 following executive producer Dick Ebersol's departure from the show at the end of the tenth season.

==== Recurring characters ====
- Alfalfa, from SNL's recurring parody of The Little Rascals and skits regarding the murder of Eddie Murphy's Buckwheat character.
- Siobhan Cahill, an Irish woman who reports on Irish events on Saturday Night News (Weekend Update's name when Brad Hall was cast as anchor). Coincidentally, Saturday Night Live would have Siobhan Fallon and Beth Cahill as cast members in the 1991-92 seventeenth season.
- Chi Chi, a Hispanic woman who hosts two fake public-access television cable TV shows (The Ghostbusters Show and Let's Watch TV) with her best friend Consuela (played by Julia Louis-Dreyfus)
- Celeste, a repressed woman married to an equally repressed man (played by Tim Kazurinsky)

==== Celebrity impersonations ====
- Ann Landers
- Brooke Shields
- Ruth Westheimer
- Nancy Reagan
- Paul Reubens (as Pee-wee Herman)
- Eleanor Roosevelt
- Geraldine Ferraro
- Harriet Nelson
- Irlene Mandrell
- Marilyn Monroe
- Mary Tyler Moore
- Jeane Dixon
- Mary Hart
- Lena Horne
- Lisa Coleman
- Margaret Thatcher
- Melissa Gilbert
- Simone de Beauvoir
- Suzanne Somers
- Leslie Uggams

== Personal life ==
Gross has never married, but as of June 1982, Chicago-based photographer Jay King was referred to as "her longtime boyfriend" in a profile/interview of Gross penned by Chicago Sun-Times writer Michael Davis. Duration aside, their relationship was also reported that year by the Chicago Tribune's Jon Anderson and several years later by researcher-author Mary Unterbrinker.

== Filmography ==
=== Film ===
Year	Title	Role	Notes
1986	Club Paradise	Jackie	
1987	Baby Boom	Charlotte Elkman	
1988	The Couch Trip	Vera Maitlin	
1988	Casual Sex?	Ilene	
1988	Big Business	Judy	
1988	Hot to Trot	Ms. French	
1988	Feds	Janis Zuckerman	
1989	Troop Beverly Hills	Annie Herman	
1992	There Goes the Neighborhood	Mrs. Bratesman	
1993	Public Enemy #2	Marcey	
1994	The Santa Clause	Ms. Daniels	
1998	Practical Magic	Debbie	
2001	Tremors 3: Back to Perfection	Tourist Mom	
2002	40 Days and 40 Nights	Bev Sullivan	
2003	A Mighty Wind	Ma Klapper	

=== Television ===
Year	Title	Role	Notes
1981–1985	Saturday Night Live	Herself / Various	Cast member
1985	Tales of the Unexpected	Woman on beach	Episode: "Scrimshaw"
1986	Amen	Nurse Kenningston	Episode: "After the Fall"
1988	Channel 99	Fifi Kurtz	TV film
1989	The People Next Door	Abigail MacIntyre Kellogg	Main role
1992	Billy	Phoebe Trillman	Recurring role
1992	Murphy Brown	Chris Manheim	Episode: "He-Ho, He-Ho, It's Off to Lamaze We Go"
1993	Jack's Place	Rosemary	Episode: "Faithful Henry"
1993–1997	Animaniacs	Katie's Mom	Voice, recurring role
1994	The Larry Sanders Show	Mary Gross	Episode: "Next Stop Bottom"
1995	Lois & Clark: The New Adventures of Superman	Nell Newtrich	Episode: "Ultra Woman"
1995	The Twisted Tales of Felix the Cat	Voices	Recurring role
1997	Something So Right	Polly	Episode: "Something About Cold Storage"
1997	The Jeff Foxworthy Show	Aunt Jane	Episode: "Twister of Fate"
1997	The Angry Beavers	Deer / Bird	Voice, episode: "Deranged Ranger"
1997–2000	Sabrina the Teenage Witch	Mrs. Quick	Recurring role
1997–2002	Hey Arnold!	School Nurse Shelley	Voice, 3 episodes
1999	Detention	Patsy Wickett	Voice, 2 episodes
2000	Happily Ever After: Fairy Tales for Every Child	Elise	Voice, episode: "The Frog Princess"
2000	Jailbait	Patti Fisher	TV film
2000	Lost Cat	Nancy Mouse	Voice, TV film
2000	What a Cartoon!	Nancy Mouse	Voice, episode: "Lost Cat"
2001	Providence	Martha Blankenship	Episode: "Love Story"
2001	Six Feet Under	Floral Instructor	Episode: "The Trip"
2001	Off Centre	Roberta Flack / Mrs. Platt	Episode: "Swing Time"
2002	Dharma & Greg	Mary	Episode: "This Diamond Ring"
2002	As Told by Ginger	Bobbie Lightfoot	Voice, episode: "Family Therapy"
2003	A Minute with Stan Hooper	Harriet	Episode: "Stan Hooper Goes to Washington"
2003	Judging Amy	Marta	Episode: "Tricks of the Trade"
2003	According to Jim	Cynthia	Episode: "Paintball"
2004	All About the Andersons	Mrs. Dyer	Episode: "Get Out of Dodge... Ball"
2004	I'm with Her	Donna Kincade	Episode: "Winners & Losers & Whiners & Boozers: Part 2"
2004	Rock Me, Baby	Ginger	Episode: "Not-So-Grand Parents"
2005	Malcolm in the Middle	Evelyn	Episode: "Chad's Sleepover"
2005	Twins	Judy	Episode: "Sister's Keeper"
2005	That's So Raven	Miss Patterson	Episode: "Cake Fear"
2006	The New Adventures of Old Christine	Mrs. Orr	Episode: "Oh God, Yes"
2007–2008	Boston Legal	Leigh Swift	Recurring role
2008	According to Jim	Lisa	Episode: "Cheryl Goes to Florida"
2008	General Hospital	Aunt Raylene	Recurring role
2009	Life	Maude Paxton	Episode: "Canyon Flowers"
2009	Californication	Principal Green	Episode: "Mr. Bad Example"
2010	In Gayle We Trust	Beth	Episode: "Gayle and the Salon"
2011	The Defenders	Judy Baker	Episode: "Nevada v. Doug the Mule"
2011	Hart of Dixie	Old Lady #3	2 episodes
2012	Pound Puppies	Mrs. Beasley	Voice, episode: "Lucky Gets Adopted"
2012	Adopting Terror	Laura	TV film
2012	Raising Hope	Denise Jenkins	Episode: "What Up, Bro?"

Media offices
Preceded by Charles Rocket	Weekend Update anchor with Brian Doyle-Murray; 1981	Succeeded by Brian Doyle-Murray as solo anchor
