= The Practical Theatre Company =

Theatre company

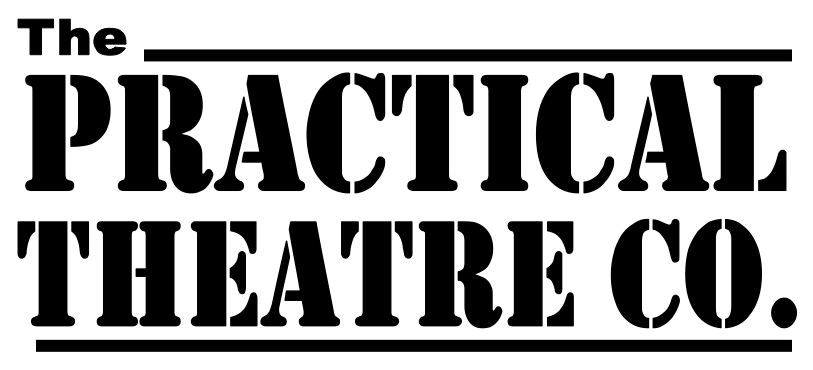
PTC Logo

The Practical Theatre Company is a Chicago-based theatre company founded by Northwestern University students and active throughout the 1980s before returning to the stage in 2010. Its productions have included new plays, satiric agitprop, rock and roll events, and a series of successful improvisational comedy revues. The PTC, whose motto is "Art is Good", is notable for the fact that the entire cast of its 1982 improvisational comedy revue, The Golden 50th Anniversary Jubilee (Brad Hall, Seinfeld star Julia Louis-Dreyfus, Gary Kroeger and Paul Barrosse) was hired by Saturday Night Live.

In the mid-1980s, The Practical Theatre Company operated two theatre spaces: the 42-seat storefront John Lennon Auditorium in Evanston, Illinois and a 150-seat cabaret in Piper's Alley at North & Wells in Chicago. During that period, with its run of hit improvisational revues, the PTC briefly rivaled The Second City as Chicago's leading comedy troupe.

== History ==
=== Early years 1979-1980 ===
The Practical Theatre Company was founded in 1979 under the name Attack Theater at Northwestern University by Brad Hall, Paul Barrosse, Robert Mendel, and Angela Murphy as a not for profit theater company dedicated to the production of improvisational comedy and new plays. The company's first show, Clowns, a play about two improvisational comedians written and performed by artistic directors Hall and Barrosse, opened on April 11, 1979, at Shanley Hall on the NU campus. In September of '79, Attack Theatre's inaugural season closed with a pair of one-act plays staged at National College of Education: Playgrounds by Hall and On the Fritzz by Grace McKeaney and Lewis Black with a cast featuring Laura Innes.

In 1980, after officially changing its name to The Practical Theatre Company, the group moved to Evanston's Noyes Cultural Arts Center for its second season. Among the shows that season was the first of the group's improvisational comedy revues, Bag O' Fun. The show's mix of slapstick, satire, absurdist comedy, agitprop, and literary sophistication tied together with music and offbeat song and dance numbers established a unique style and format that the PTC would refine in more than a dozen revues over the next seven years.

=== The John Lennon Auditorium ===
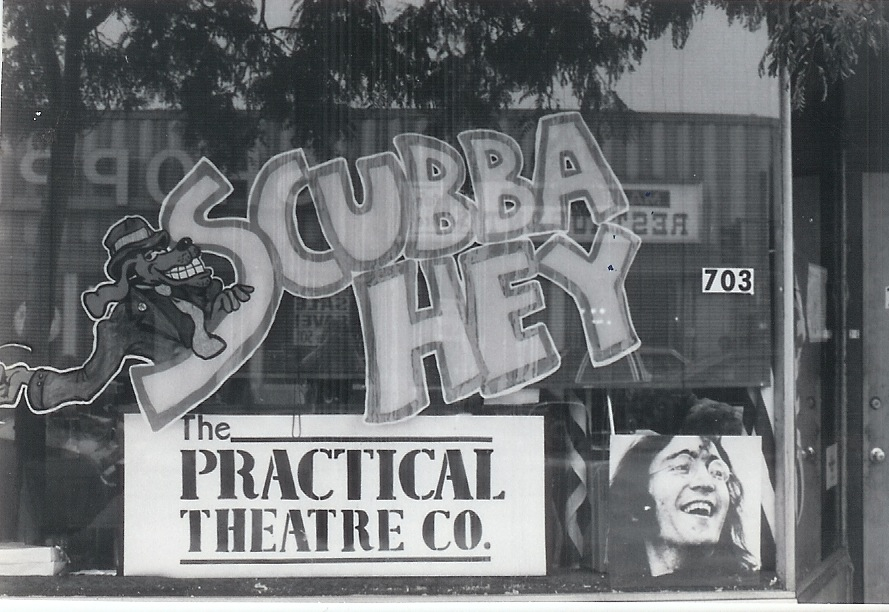
The John Lennon Auditorium (1981)

In the fall of 1980, the company relocated to a leased storefront at 703 Howard Street on the border of Evanston and Chicago. The company named their new storefront theatre space The John Lennon Auditorium. Just two months after they christened their new theatre in his honor, John Lennon was killed on December 8, 1980.

The 42-seat John Lennon Auditorium (The JLA) was designed by actor and theatrical designer Louis DiCrescenzo, whom Brad Hall had met when they were both in the cast of the original production of Do Black Patent Leather Shoes Really Reflect Up? Material support from other Chicago theatres helped the PTC to build The JLA. Artistic Director Robert Falls of Wisdom Bridge Theatre (located further east on Howard Street) was renovating his space and donated his old theater seats. Stuart Oken and Jason Brett of The Apollo Theatre in Lincoln Park donated lighting equipment.

==== Thrills & Glory ====
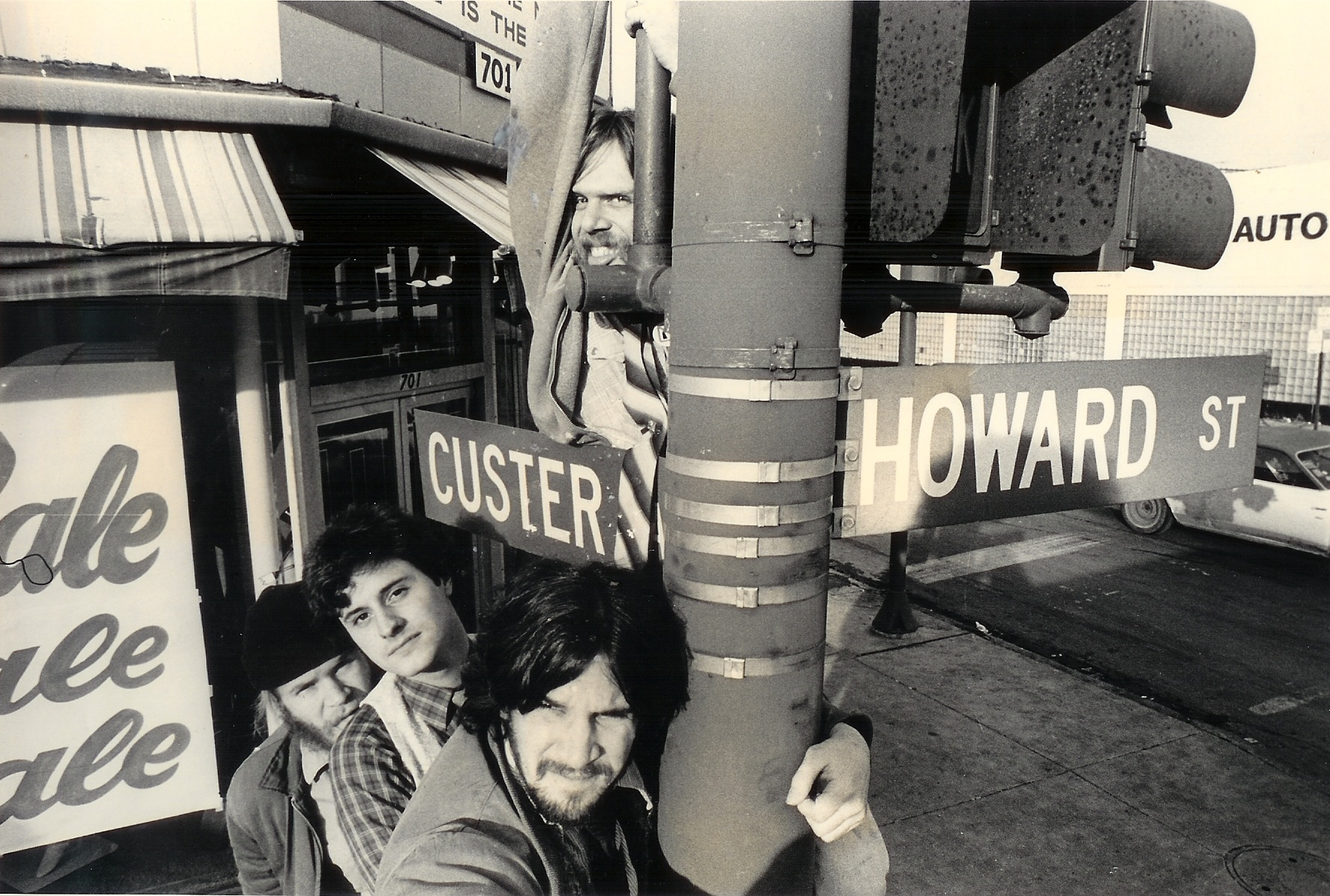
Thrills & Glory (1981)

The Practical Theatre Company's third season, its first at the John Lennon Auditorium, proved to be a turning point for the group. The season opened on March 21, 1981, with Thrills & Glory, the group's second improvisational comedy revue. Rush Pearson, Gary Kroeger and Reid Branson joined Paul Barrosse in the cast. In one sketch, a squad of American soldiers found themselves on the eve of battle in Basra, Iraq. In its choice of satiric targets, The PTC was often ahead of its time. Later that season, a premiere of the dark comedy Stunning Achievements in Iowa by Mark D. Kaufman was a critical success, earning the group its first of many Joseph Jefferson awards.

==== Scubba Hey ====
The turning point that third season came when the prominent director Sheldon Patinkin came to the JLA to judge the group's third improvisational comedy revue Scubba Hey for the Joseph Jefferson Committee. Patinkin's involvement with The Practical Theatre helped to accelerate the young company's development, artistically and from a business standpoint.

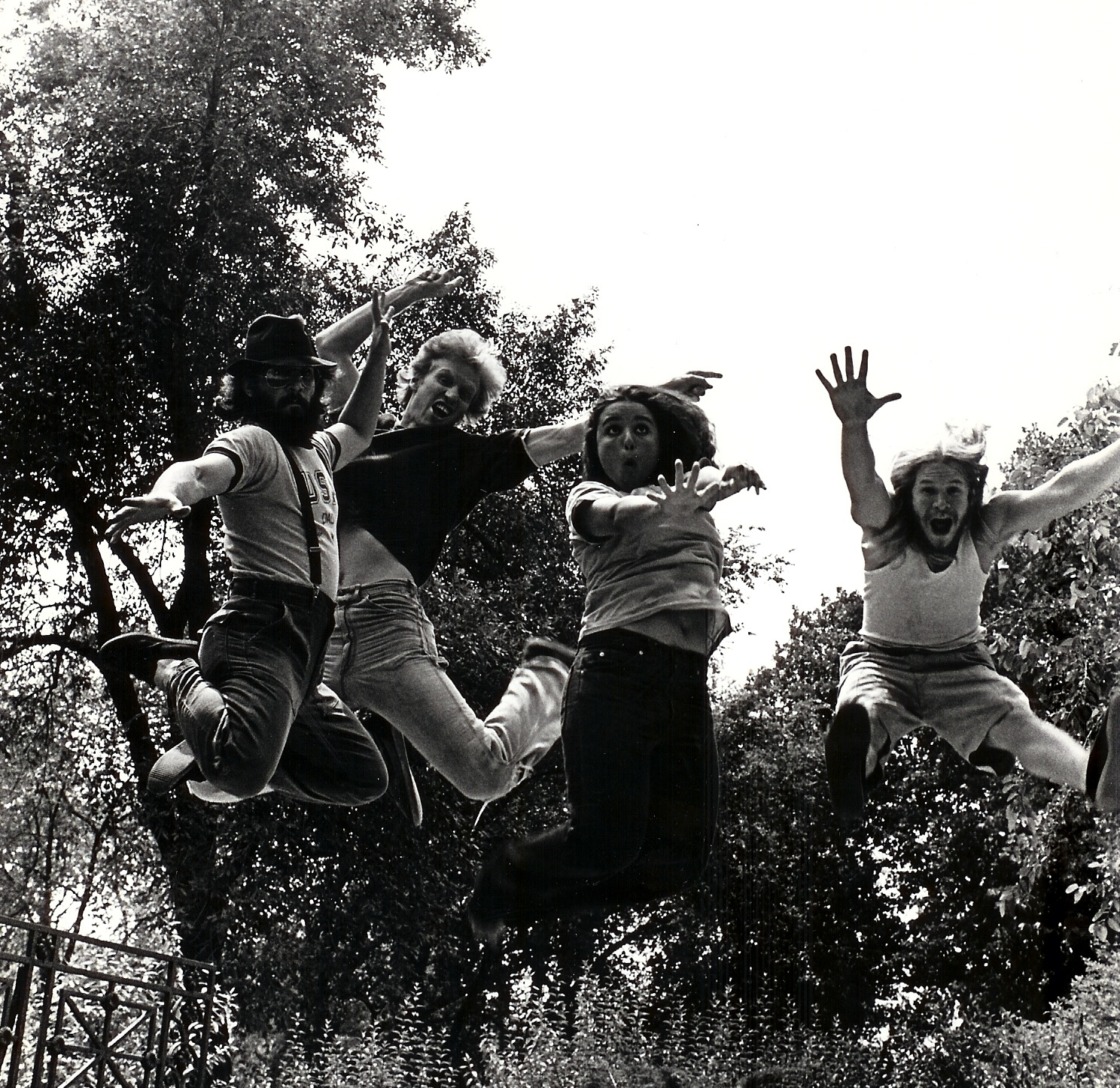
Scubba Hey! (1981)

Scubba Hey featured Barrosse, Hall, Pearson and Louis-Dreyfus, whom Barrosse and Pearson met when they performed together in the 1980 Mee-Ow Show at Northwestern. Scubba Hey was a critical and box office hit, and the group closed its first season at the JLA with Beggar's Holiday, an original comedy which opened on November 28, 1981, to a glowing review by Richard Christiansen of the Chicago Tribune, who called the PTC "as zany a bunch of intellectual clowns as the Earth can hold."

==== The Brothers Bubba ====
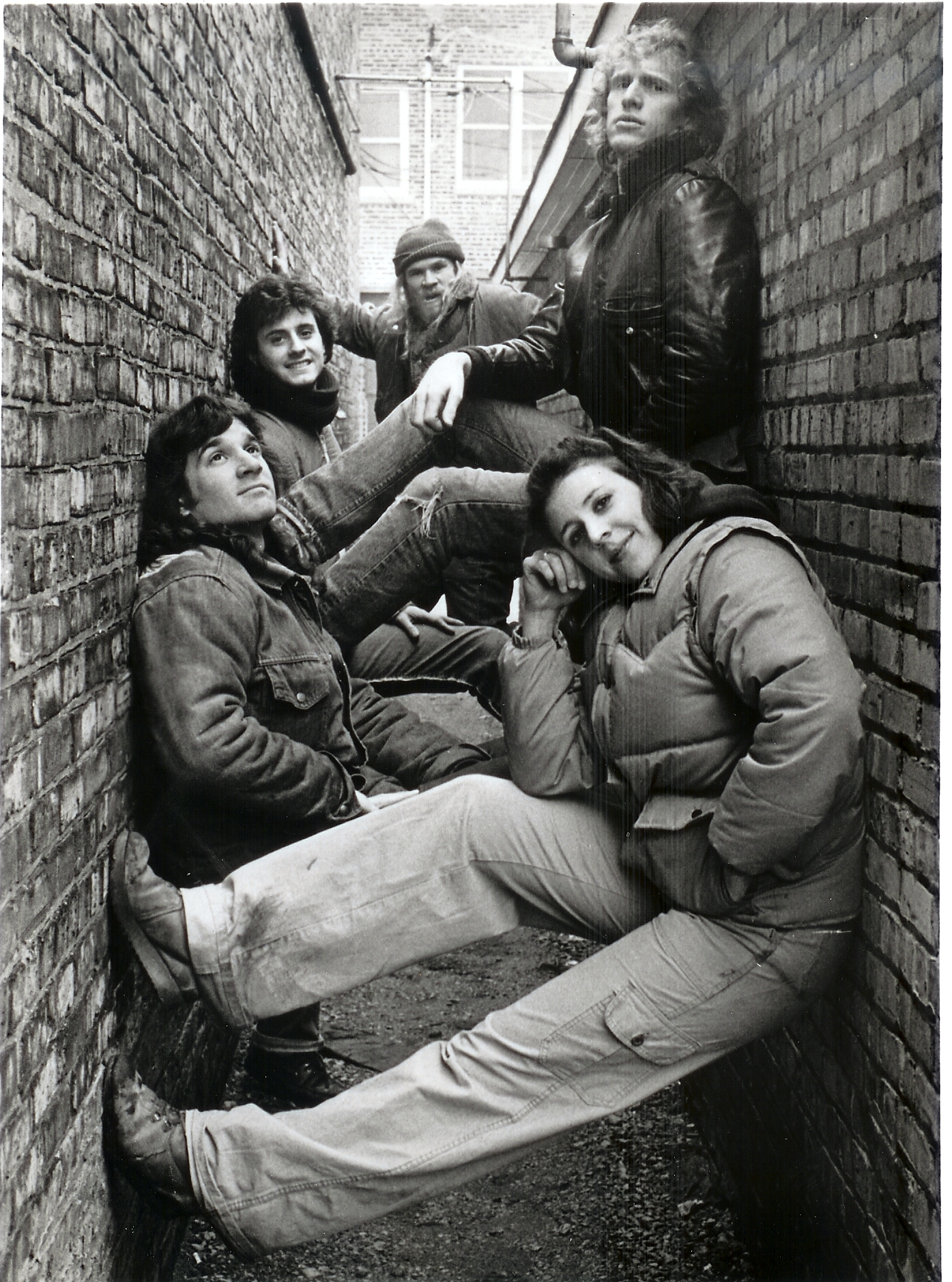
The Brothers Bubba (1982)

The PTC's second season in the John Lennon Auditorium opened on April Fools' Day, 1982 with The Brothers Bubba, the group's fourth improvisational comedy revue. Under Patinkin's guidance, Hall, Barrosse, Pearson, Kroeger, and Jane Muller crafted the company's most successful show to date, as 1,314 ticket buyers crammed into the 42-seat JLA over the six-week run. It was clear that, given the company's increasing popularity, a larger space (in addition to the JLA) was needed to mount the group's next improvisational comedy revue.

==== Attack Theatre and The Practical Women ====
Meanwhile, the "Attack Theatre" name was revived for a series of agitprop after-shows under the direction of Terry McCabe, another NU alum. Attack Theatre took on social and political issues like gun control and the abuse of women in short, provocative pieces, staged after the main stage shows at the JLA. Other after-shows featured The Practical Women, a project led by PTC co-founder Angela Murphy, designed to encourage female talent in the male-dominated improvisational comedy environment.

=== The Piper's Alley Theatre and Saturday Night Live ===
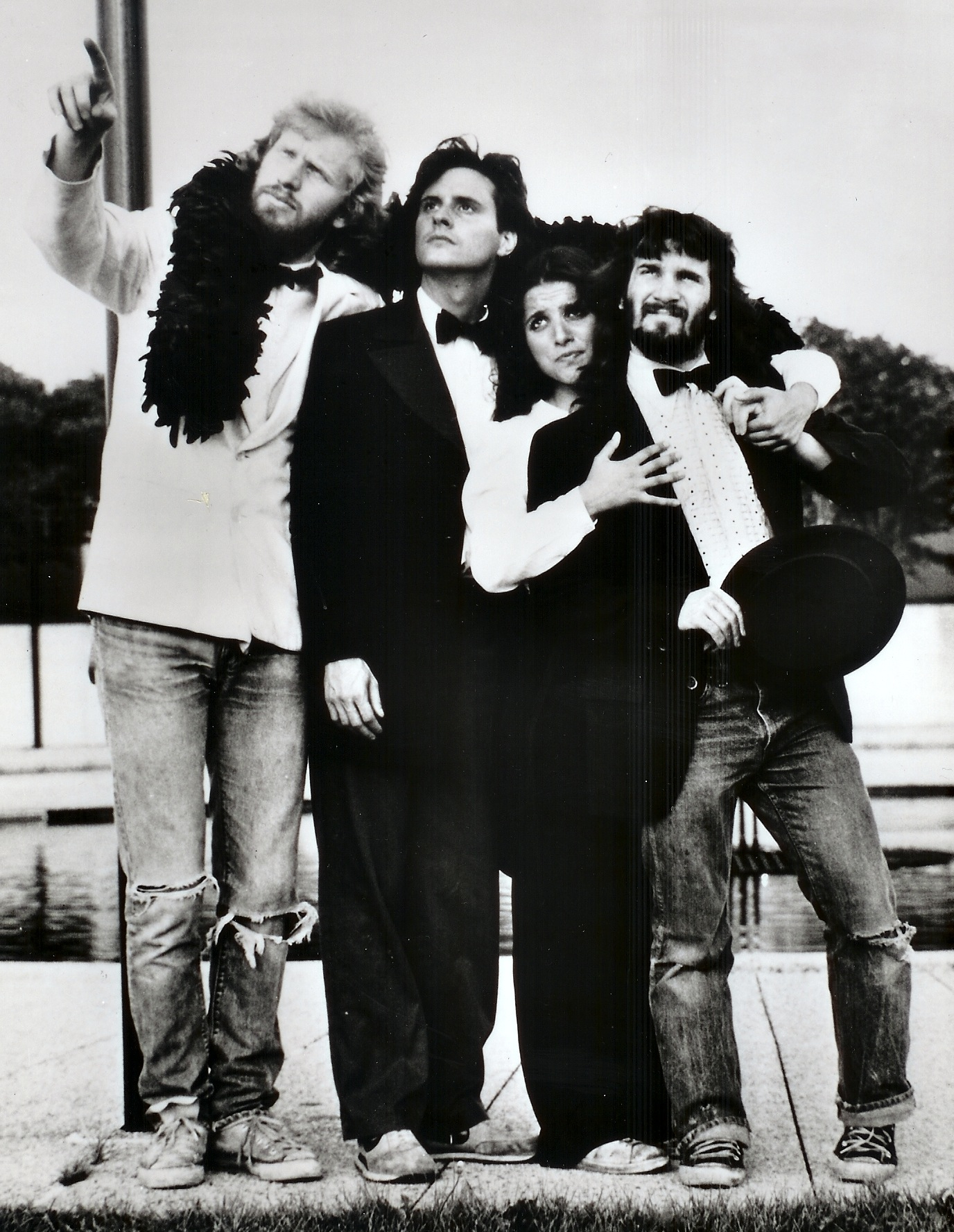
The Golden Jubilee (1982)

Sheldon Patinkin was responsible for introducing the PTC to Second City founder Bernard Sahlins, with whom they reached an agreement to open a cabaret in a Piper Alley's space behind Second City. The 150-seat Piper's Alley Theatre was designed by Louis DiCrescenzo specifically to be the home of the PTC's comedy revues.

==== The Golden Jubilee ====
The first show at the Piper's Alley Theater, The Golden 50th Anniversary Jubilee, opened on July 28, 1982, and put the Practical Theatre in the national spotlight when it caught the attention of Saturday Night Live producers Dick Ebersol and Bob Tischler. Just weeks into the show's run, Ebersol and Tischler hired the four stars of the show, Hall, Barrosse, Louis-Dreyfus and Kroeger, as writers and performers on the well-known NBC late-night comedy program.

The association with Saturday Night Live would cause considerable change within the PTC. Artistic Directors Hall and Barrosse split their time between working at SNL in New York and returning to Chicago on their breaks to oversee the Practical Theatre Company, especially pre-production and rehearsals for Megafun, the group's next comedy revue in Piper's Alley, and the opening of The Practical Women's first main stage show at The John Lennon Auditorium, A Cast of Squirrels Before Swine, featuring Angela Murphy, Isabella Hofmann, Lynn Baber, Sandy Snyder and Ileen Getz. Squirrels Before Swine’s 13-week run at the JLA was the PTC's longest to date.

==== Megafun ====
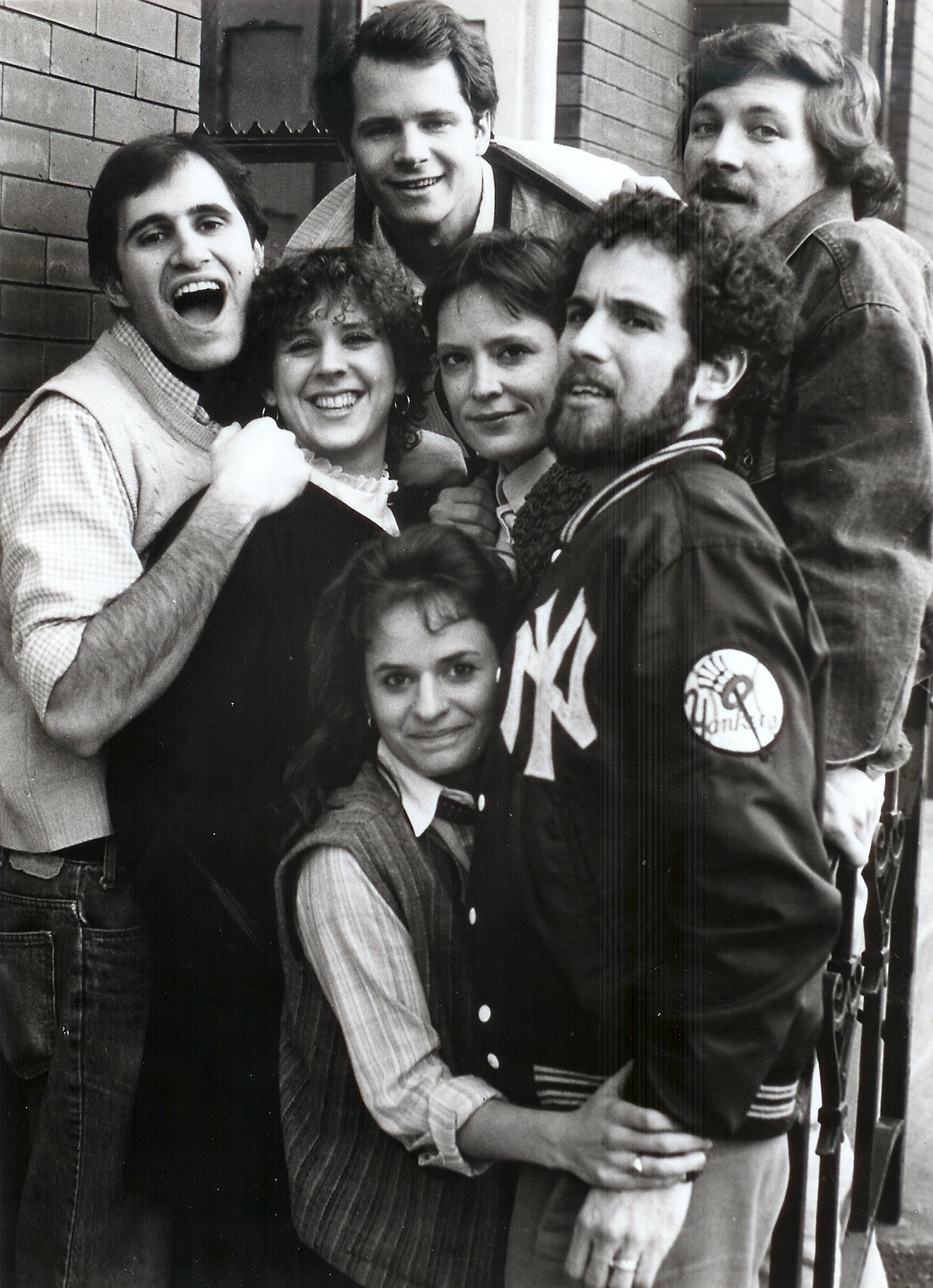
Megafun (1983)

The PTC's second improvisational comedy revue at Piper's Alley, Megafun, opened on March 24, 1983 and became the company's longest-running, most successful show to date. Featured in the cast were Tom Virtue, Richard Kind, Victoria Zielinski, Jeff Lupetin, Lynn Anderson, Jamie Baron and Jane Muller. To have followed its breakthrough national success with another critical and popular hit established The Practical as arguably the preeminent comedy company in Chicago.

=== Babalooney and Off-Broadway ===
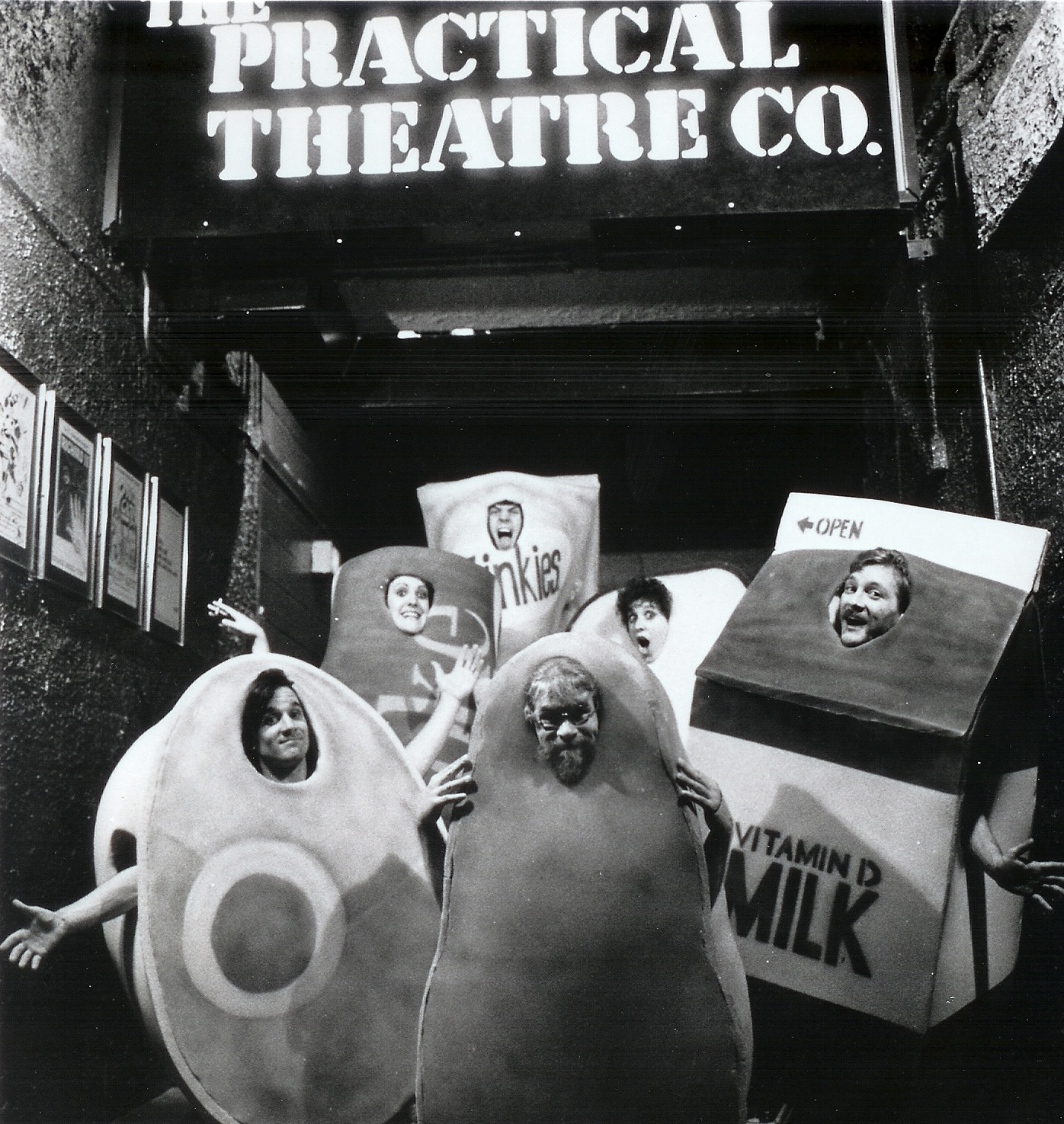
Babalooney (1983)

In the summer of 1983, after one season of SNL, Barrosse returned to full-time work with the Practical Theatre Company and the group's third comedy revue at Piper's Alley, Babalooney, featuring Barrosse, Pearson, Baron, Muller, Lynn Baber and Rod McLachlan, with Larry Schanker on piano and Ronny Crawford on drums. In his review of the show, Christiansen of the Tribune wrote, "It's encouraging, as well as entertaining, to see the Practicals still turning out the same sweet, zany humor that first endeared them to audiences. They may have lost some of their membership to Saturday Night Live in New York and to Second City next door, but as this revue proves, they have not lost their capacity for fun." An enthusiastic Variety review caught the attention of Arthur Cantor, a New York-based theatrical producer, who brought the show to the Provincetown Playhouse in Greenwich Village in February 1984—but it had substantial cast and content changes. Babalooney was not nearly as successful Off Broadway as it was in Chicago. The show received mixed reviews from New York critics and closed after three weeks.

=== Association with The Goodman Theatre ===
By the spring of 1984, The PTC was no longer operating in the Piper's Alley Theater, though it continued to stage shows at the John Lennon Auditorium in Evanston, most notably Soapbox Sweepstakes, a satire of the 1984 Presidential election campaigns which ran for 31 weeks, right up to Election Day.

The PTC's next comedy revue, The Merry Guys Who Windsurf, was staged at the Goodman Theatre studio and directed by Barrosse with a cast including Herb Metzler, John Goodrich, Ross Salinger, Kit Falsgraf, McLachlan and Baber. Backed by Michael Mennies on piano, Victor Peterson on Guitar, and Roger Anderson on drums, Merry Guys was well reviewed by critics, and Bury St. Edmund at The Chicago Reader opined, "The Merry Guys Who Windsurf is going to be your basic summer comedy hit." But Merry Guys failed to draw large audiences to The Goodman Studio. The group continued its association with The Goodman's artistic director Greg Mosher, who cast many PTC ensemble members (and musical director Shanker) in his adaptation of A Christmas Carol' at the Auditorium Theater, a landmark 3,900-seat theater in downtown Chicago. The production, whose cast included Barrosse, Hall, Frank Galati, Innes and Del Close, received mixed reviews from critics.

=== End of an Era 1985-1988 ===
In 1985, the Company refocused its efforts on staging plays at the John Lennon Auditorium, but after producing a pair of one-act plays, it became apparent that the 42-seat theater would not provide enough revenue to meet the costs of an Actor's Equity Contract the PTC had signed earlier in the year, and the group left the theater it had built.

==== Art, Ruth & Trudy ====
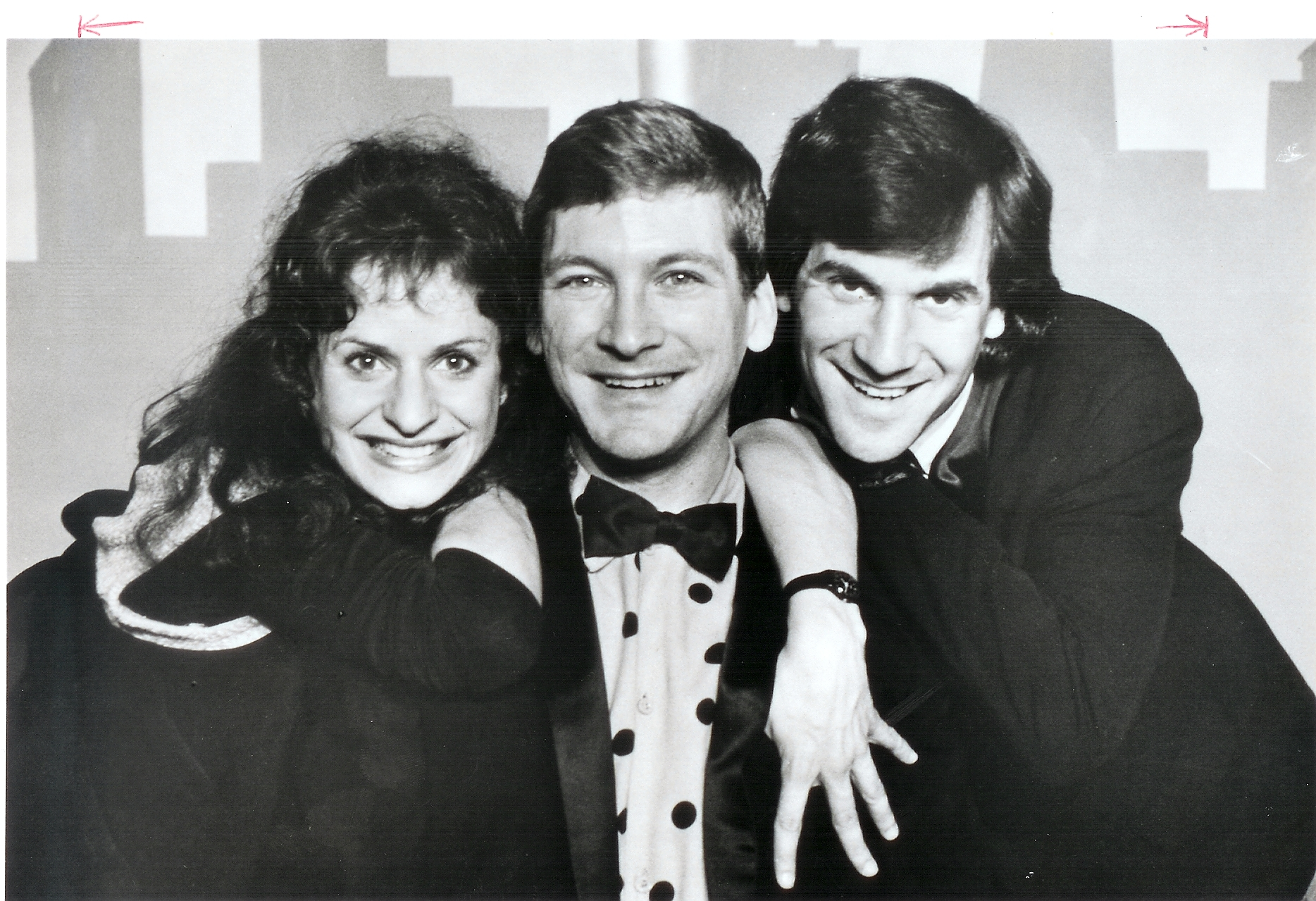
Art, Ruth & Trudy (1986)

In May 1986, the Practical Theatre Company opened its next improvisational comedy revue, Art Ruth & Trudy at Club Victoria, nearly two years since its last revue closed at The Goodman Studio. Featuring Barrosse, Victoria Zielinski, Baron, musical director Steve Rashid on piano, and guided by Patinkin, Art, Ruth & Trudy received very positive reviews and became the longest running show in the company's history. The show then moved to the larger Briar Street Theater and on to the even larger Vic Theatre where it finished its 9-month run.

==== Bozo the Town ====
In 1987, the company premiered its last comedy review of the 1980s: Bozo the Town at The Vic Theater. With Barrosse, Zielinski and Kyle Hefner in the cast, backed by Steve Rashid on piano and Don Stiernberg on guitar, Bozo received mixed reviews and ran for two months.

==== Rock Me! ====
That same year, Patinkin worked with Barrosse and Hall to develop Rock Me!, a show about an aging garage band for Columbia College's New Musicals Project. On August 1, 1988, The Practical Theatre performed Rock Me! to a sold-out house at The Apollo Theatre. Joining Hall and Barrosse in the cast were Zielinski, Pearson, Peter Van Wagner and keyboardist Schanker. The production also starred fellow Northwestern alum Megan Mullally. Rock Me! would be the last PTC performance in Chicago for 23 years.

=== The PTC Returns 2010 ===
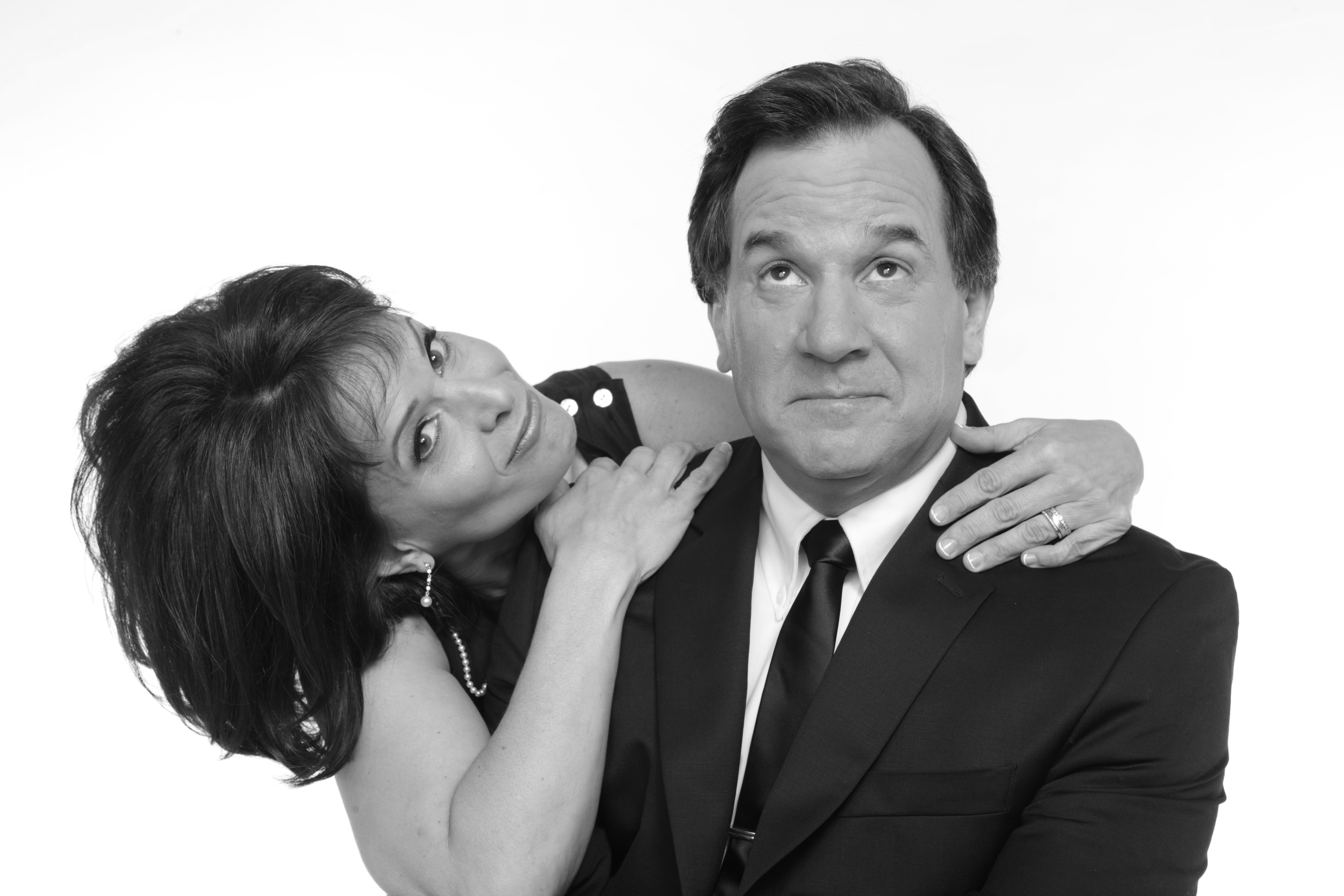
The Vic & Paul Show (2010-11)

After a 22-year hiatus, the Practical Theatre Company reemerged in June 2010 when Barrosse, Zielinski and Rashid opened The Vic & Paul Show in Los Angeles. They brought the improvisational comedy revue to Chicago for a one-week run in June 2011: the first PTC show in Chicago in 23 years. The Vic & Paul Show returned to Chicago in December 2011 for a two-week run at Mayne Stage in the north side Rogers Park neighborhood. In the summer of 2012, The Vic & Paul Show played The Beverly Arts Center in Chicago, The 14th Street Theatre in Cleveland's Playhouse Square, and the iO West Theatre in Los Angeles. The PTC production Mr. Olsen's New Year's Rockin' Neighborhood was staged at 27 Live in Evanston, Illinois on New Year's Eve 2013.

In 2015, Paul Barrosse and Victoria Zielinski teamed with fellow Northwestern University and Mee-Ow Show alum, Dana Olsen, to write and perform a comedy revue entitled "The Vic & Paul & Dana Show" at iO West in Hollywood, featuring Steve Rashid on keys and Ronny Crawford on drums. The following year, they staged "Mr. Olsen's Holiday Party" at Studio5 in Evanston.

== Graphic artists ==
The Practical Theatre Company worked with a number of distinguished graphic artists during its history, notably Ron Crawford, Gary Whitney, Paul Guinan and John Goodrich.

== Rock & roll ==
The group's house rock and roll band, Riffmaster & The Rockme Foundation became a fixture on the Chicago club scene in the mid-1980s and continues to play together on occasion, most recently in 2010 at SPACE in Evanston and in 2013 at 27 Live, also in Evanston, the college town where The Practical Theatre began. Another notable band formed by PTC members were The Daves.

== Production history ==
- Clowns (1979)
- Subnormal (1979)
- Playgrounds (1979)
- On the Fritzz (1979)
- Bag O' Fun (1980)
- Nightfall (1980)
- Citizen Stumpick (1980)
- Sant O'Claus on the Christmas Beat (1980)
- Thrills & Glory (1981)
- Subnormal (1981)
- Stunning Achievements in Iowa (1981)
- Scubba Hey (1981)
- Beggar's Holiday (1981)
- The Brothers Bubba (1982)
- Song of the Snells (1982)
- No Restroom for the Wicked (1982)
- The Golden 50th Anniversary Jubilee (1982)
- A Cast of Squirrels Before Swine (1982)
- The Practical Theatre Company Meets Godzilla (1982)
- Megafun (1983)
- Diary of a Madman (1983)
- Babalooney (1983)
- My Dog Ate It (1983)
- Flight (1983)
- Tomato (1983)
- A Passion for Being Nice (1983)
- Wild Connections (1983)
- Hula-Rama (1983)
- The Diamond Anniversary Comedy Ball & Cakewalk (1984)
- Beats Workin’: The Best of the Practical Theatre Company (1984)
- Soapbox Sweepstakes: The 1984 Election Revue (1984)
- The Merry Guys Who Windsurf (1984)
- Noonday Demons (1985)
- Wendell and Betty in the Throes of Anarchy (1985)
- Art, Ruth & Trudy (1986)
- Deer Season (1986)
- Bozo the Town (1987)
- Rockme! (1988)
