= The Wilmette Theatre =

The Wilmette Theatre is a multi-arts and performance center in Wilmette, Illinois; a northern suburb of Chicago. It is run as a not-for-profit organization.

The theatre was opened in 1913. The building was bought by Encyclopædia Britannica Films (EBF) in 1950. In 1966 Richard Stern bought the theatre from EBF, and operated it for 40 years. The theatre became a nonprofit organization in 2011.

Programming includes movies, partnerships with leading cultural institutions, and live events. There are two theatres, one seating 140 with a stage, lighting and sound system. The other theatre has 110 seats and an event space in the rear of the theatre.
