= Gary Kroeger =

American actor (born 1957)

- Born: April 13, 1957 (age 69); Cedar Falls, Iowa, U.S.
- Education: Northwestern University (BA)
- Occupations: Actor; businessman; comedian; politician
- Years active: 1982–present
- Spouses: Leigh Kroeger (m. 1997; div. 2007); Shannon Alexander (m. 2017)

Gary Kroeger (born April 13, 1957) is an American businessman, politician, writer, comedian and actor best known for his work as a cast member on Saturday Night Live from 1982 to 1985, and his work on various game shows. He ran in the Democratic Congressional primary in 2016 and then for an Iowa state house seat in the 2016 election, losing to incumbent Republican Walt Rogers. He is the father of Christopher Kroeger, better known as Marcus the Worm IRL.

== Personal information ==
Gary Kroeger was born in Cedar Falls, Iowa. Kroeger attended Northern University High School and graduated from Northwestern University in 1981. He was married to Leigh Kroeger from 1997 to 2007, with whom he shares two sons, Christopher and Alexander. Kroeger married Shannon Alexander, a user experience designer from Massachusetts in 2017.

== The Practical Theatre Company and Saturday Night Live ==
In 1981 Kroeger joined The Practical Theatre Company (a Chicago-based theatre company that had been founded by Northwestern University students in 1979). In 1982 Kroeger, along with his fellow Practical Theatre Company performers Brad Hall, Julia Louis-Dreyfus, and Paul Barrosse, joined the cast of Saturday Night Live during Lorne Michaels's hiatus from the show, under the direction of Dick Ebersol. During his tenure, Kroeger, who also wrote for the show, was frequently cast as a young teenage kid and impersonated Walter Mondale when he was the Democratic candidate for US President in 1984. He is probably best remembered today for a Christmas sketch in which he and fellow cast member Julia Louis-Dreyfus perform "Blue Christmas" as Donny and Marie Osmond. The sketch culminates with the supposed brother and sister making out with each other.

== Later acting career ==
Kroeger, who wanted to return for the 11th season, along with fellow cast member Billy Crystal, left the show in 1985 when Michaels returned to the show and the entire cast was replaced. He appeared as a movie producer in Christopher Guest's 1989 Hollywood send-up The Big Picture; as Reggie Mantle in 1990's Archie: To Riverdale and Back Again; and in the title role in the spoof film A Man Called Sarge. Kroeger played a major role in the Murder, She Wrote episode "The Grand Old Lady" as brainiac Christopher “Christy” McGinn, who ultimately solves the mystery.

He has also worked as a host of television game shows, most notably revivals of The Newlywed Game and Beat the Clock. He was also the announcer for the 2001 revival of Card Sharks and the 2002 revival of Press Your Luck called Whammy! The All-New Press Your Luck. In addition, he appeared on the sitcom Hidden Hills and as a weatherman in a 2004 episode of HBO's Curb Your Enthusiasm (Season 4, Episode 4). From 1990 to 1991, he was host of Fox's Comic Strip Live.

Kroeger also made a guest appearance in the episode Columbo: Death Hits the Jackpot (1991), as the murder victim. In 2000, he hosted an infomercial for DirecTV, which played in-store at many Best Buy locations. In 2002, he hosted the 26th annual Mrs. America Pageant.

Kroeger is also a "veteran performer" with the Cedar Falls Community Theatre. Some of his more recent appearances include their June 2021 production of Mamma Mia! in which he played the role of Sam Carmichael and their June 2022 production of The Fantasticks in which he played the role of El Gallo.

== Business career ==
Kroeger gave up ownership of the restaurant Figaro Figaro in Simi Valley, California in 2003, but reopened in Cedar Falls, Iowa, in 2017. The restaurant closed in 2019. He has relocated to his hometown in Iowa and can still be seen in local theater, as well as the occasional infomercial. Kroeger is a weekly columnist for the Waterloo Cedar Falls Courier and also writes a blog, "Gary Has Issues".

As of 2013, Kroeger is creative director for Cedar Falls, Iowa-based Mudd Advertising and well as CEO of a consulting firm, Outlier Creative Solutions.

== Political campaign ==
He announced his candidacy for the U.S. House of Representatives from Iowa's 1st congressional district on April 6, 2015, but announced on March 2, 2016, that he was dropping his bid in order to run for the Iowa House of Representatives; he lost to incumbent Republican Walt Rogers, by a vote count of 10,072 to 7,200.

Preceded by Gene Wood	Card Sharks announcer 2001	Succeeded by Donna Jay Fulks (2019-22)
