= Brad Hall =

American actor (born 1958)

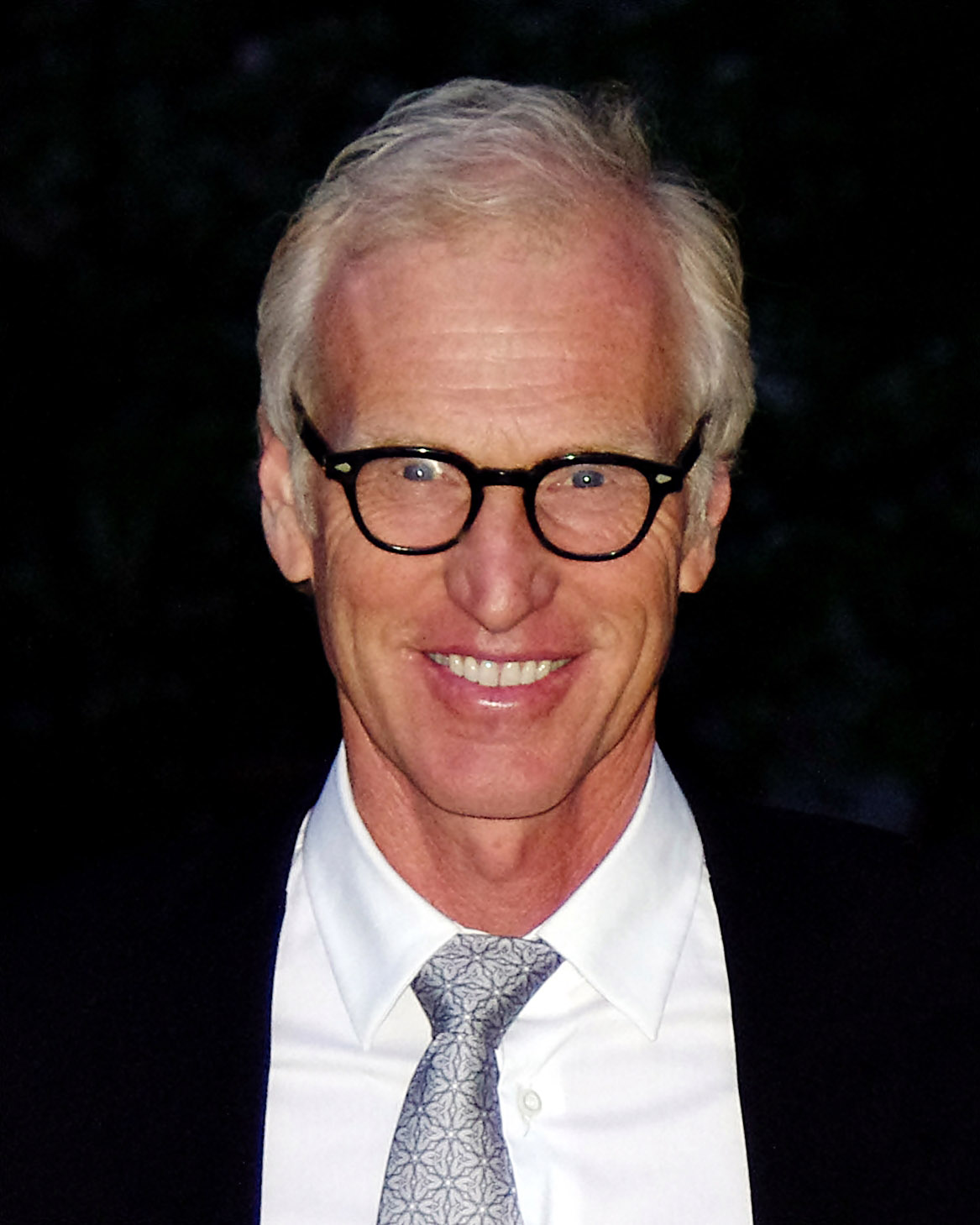
- Hall at the 2012 Tribeca Film Festival
- Born: William Bradford Hall; March 21, 1958 (age 68); Santa Barbara, California, U.S.
- Education: Northwestern University (BA)
- Occupations: Actor; comedian; filmmaker
- Years active: 1982–present
- Spouse: Julia Louis-Dreyfus (m. 1987)
- Children: 2, including Charlie Hall
- Relatives: Gérard Louis-Dreyfus (father-in-law); Lauren Bowles (half sister-in-law)

William Bradford Hall (born March 21, 1958) is an American actor, comedian, and filmmaker. He appeared on Saturday Night Live from 1982 to 1984. He was also known for manning the Weekend Update (then rebranded as Saturday Night News) anchor desk on the show.

Hall was a producer, writer, and director on the Golden Globe winning sitcom Brooklyn Bridge, for which he received a Primetime Emmy Award nomination. He also created the sitcoms The Single Guy and Watching Ellie. He has appeared in various motion pictures, most notably the 1986 cult classic Troll and as Nancy Allen's boyfriend in 1989's Limit Up. In 2012, he directed Picture Paris, which appeared at the Tribeca Film Festival. He also has guest-starred on series such as Parks and Recreation, Brooklyn Nine-Nine, and Curb Your Enthusiasm.

== Early life ==
Hall was born William Bradford Hall on March 21, 1958 and raised in Santa Barbara, California. He was an avid surfer as a child, saying that he "learned how to surf as soon as I could walk."

== Personal life ==
Hall is married to actress Julia Louis-Dreyfus, whom he met while both were attending Northwestern University in Evanston, Illinois. They met in a comedy troupe that Hall started, called The Practical Theater. They both performed on Saturday Night Live from 1982 to 1984, appeared together in Troll (1986), and guest-starred together on two episodes of Curb Your Enthusiasm. They have two sons, Henry (b. 1992) and Charles (b. 1997).

Hall and his wife lost their Pacific Palisades house, which they purchased in the 1990s, in the 2025 Palisades Fire. He serves on the US Board of Directors of SurfAid International.

== Filmography ==
=== Film ===
Year	Title	Role	Notes	Ref.
1986	Troll	William Daniels		
1989	Worth Winning	Eric		
1989	Limit Up	Marty Callahan		
1990	The Guardian	Ned Runcie		
1995	Bye Bye Love	Phil	Also writer and producer	
1998	A Bug's Life	Grasshopper	Voice	
2005	Must Love Dogs	Stanley	Also executive producer	
2010	Love Shack	Dr. Alan Rudnick		
2012	Picture Paris		Short film Writer and director	
2023	First Time Female Director	Miles Paris		

=== Television ===
Year	Title	Role	Notes	Ref.
1982–1984	Saturday Night Live	Himself/various characters	Series regular (39 episodes)	
1986	9 to 5	Devlin	Episode: "Even Super Women Get the Blues"	
1988	CBS Summer Playhouse	Montanna	Episode: "Mad Avenue"	
1989	Empty Nest	Chuck	Episode: "Full Nest"	
1989	Day by Day	Charlie	Episode: "The Music Man"	
1990	American Dreamer		Writer; Episode: "Flight of the Dodo"	
1991–1993	Brooklyn Bridge		Writer – 32 episodes Supervising producer – 13 episodes Director – 1 episode	
1993	Frasier		Writer; Episode: "Here's Looking at You"	
1995–1997	The Single Guy		44 episodes Creator, writer, and executive producer	
2000–2001	Curb Your Enthusiasm	Himself	2 episodes	
2002–2003	Watching Ellie		19 episodes Creator, writer, and executive producer	
2006	Saturday Night Live	Audience Member	Episode: "Julia Louis-Dreyfus/Paul Simon"	
2012	Parks and Recreation	Wreston St. James	Episode: "Pawnee Commons"	
2016	Brooklyn Nine-Nine	John William Weichselbraun	Episode: "House Mouses"	
2016	Veep		Director – 3 episodes	
2019	Undone	Charlie	3 episodes	
2022–2023	American Auto	Richard Hastings	4 episodes	

== Recurring characters on SNL ==
- Mike Phillips, friend of El Dorko (Gary Kroeger)
- The Human Stapler, a superhero who uses his hands to bind his victims (a member of The Interesting Four)
- Larry Rolans, the host of Larry's Corner

=== Celebrity impersonations ===
- John DeLorean
- John Hinckley
- Noel Paul Stookey
- Pete Best
- William F. Buckley
- John Lennon
