= Robin Duke =

Canadian actress, comedian, and voice actress (born 1954)

- Born: March 13, 1954 (age 72); St. Catharines, Ontario, Canada
- Occupations: Actress, comedian
- Years active: 1976–present
- Spouse: Hendrik Riik
- Children: 1

Robin Duke (born March 13, 1954) is a Canadian actress, comedian, and voice actress. Duke may be best known for her work on the television comedy series SCTV and, later, Saturday Night Live. She co-founded Women Fully Clothed, a sketch comedy troupe which toured Canada. She teaches writing as a faculty member at Humber College in Toronto and had a recurring role playing Wendy Kurtz in the sitcom Schitt's Creek.

== Early life ==
Duke was born in St. Catharines, Ontario. She went to high school with Catherine O'Hara at Burnhamthorpe Collegiate Institute in Etobicoke; they first met in homeroom class.

== Career ==
In 1976, Duke joined O'Hara as part of the Toronto version of the stage comedy troupe The Second City, while also making several appearances in the troupe's television series, SCTV. Duke became a regular on SCTV from 1980 to 1981. She joined the cast of Saturday Night Live in 1981 when O'Hara suddenly dropped out of that show. She now teaches at Humber College's Comedy Writing and Performance program, teaching Improv and Voice and Acting, it's been quoted by her that "class C is my favorite".

=== Saturday Night Live (SNL) (1981–1984) ===
Duke was an actor and writer on SNL from 1981 to 1984. Duke was hired in place of Catherine O'Hara, who was chosen as a cast member in 1981 but had decided to return to SCTV instead, since NBC had acquired that show to run as a possible replacement for Saturday Night Live at the time. Duke's most popular character was Wendy Whiner, a woman who, with her equally whiny husband (Joe Piscopo), annoyed everyone she met. She is also remembered for appearing with Mr. T as the equally bizarre Mrs. T in a faux commercial for the real-life product "Mr. and Mrs. T's Bloody Mary Mix".

=== Film acting credits ===
Duke went on to appear in such films as Club Paradise (1986), Groundhog Day (1993), Stuart Saves His Family (1995), and Portrait of a Serial Monogamist (2015), along with many television guest appearances.

=== Voice-over acting credits ===
Duke is also the voice of Penny in the children's animated television series George and Martha. Her other voice roles include:

- Bob and Margaret
- Atomic Betty
- Marvin the Tap-Dancing Horse

=== Women Fully Clothed (2004) ===
In 2004, Duke along with Kathryn Greenwood, Debra McGrath, Jayne Eastwood and Teresa Pavlinek created Women Fully Clothed, a sketch comedy troupe. The group has toured the United States, Canada and appeared in Scotland at the Edinburgh Festival.

=== Schitt's Creek (2016, 2019) ===
In 2016, Duke had a recurring role on Schitt's Creek playing dress shop owner Wendy Kurtz in five episodes of season 2. The sitcom reunited Duke with her former SCTV castmate Eugene Levy, and with Catherine O'Hara, whom she had replaced on SCTV. Duke made another appearance as Kurtz in the Season 5 episode “Roadkill”.

== Filmography ==
=== Film ===
Year	Title	Role	Notes
1979	Running	Olympic Office Receptionist	
1986	Club Paradise	Mary Lou	
1987	Blue Monkey	Sandra Baker	
1991	Motorama	Miss Lawton	
1992	Only You	Mrs. Johnson	
1992	There Goes the Neighborhood	The Colangelos	
1993	Groundhog Day	Doris the Waitress	
1994	I Love Trouble	Sandra	
1995	Stuart Saves His Family	Cousin Denise	
1996	Multiplicity	Ballet School Receptionist	
2015	Portrait of a Serial Monogamist	Abby Neufeld	
2025	John Candy: I Like Me	Herself	Documentary
2026	The Snake	Anne	

=== Television ===
Year	Title	Role	Notes
1976–81	Second City Television	Various	27 episodes
1977	King of Kensington	Doris	Episode: "The Quiz Show"
1981–84	Saturday Night Live	Various	59 episodes
1985	The Last Polka	Max Lemon	Television film
1988	The Second City Toronto 15th Anniversary	Florence Allen	Television film
1989	I, Martin Short, Goes Hollywood	Drunk Woman	Television film
1990, 1991	Maniac Mansion	Carla / Jazz Pope	2 episodes
1994	Hostage for a Day	Elizabeth Kooey	Television film
1996	The Adventures of Dudley the Dragon	Tiny Raincloud	Episode: "Dudley and the Tiny Raincloud"
1996–97	Boston Common	Dr. Brenda Nidorf	4 episodes
1996, 1997	North of 60	Faith	2 episodes
1996–98	Stickin' Around	Voice	7 episodes
1997	F/X: The Series	Woman	Episode: "Shooting Mickey"
1997–98	The Adventures of Sam & Max: Freelance Police	Voice	15 episodes
1998	The Outer Limits	Sheriff Marie DuPont	Episode: "Glyphic"
1998	Degas and the Dancer	Zoe	Television film
1998–2000	Bad Dog	Voice	15 episodes
1999–2000	George and Martha	Penny	26 episodes
1999–2000	Blaster's Universe	Voice	13 episodes
2000	Quints	Fiona	Television film
2000	The Sandy Bottom Orchestra	Mrs. Johnson	Television film
2000	Marvin the Tap-Dancing Horse	Edna	Episode: "Eddy's Job/ Elephants Almost Never Forget"
2000	Virtual Mom	Maude Gozmecki	Television film
2001	Bob and Margaret	Joyce	Episode: "Fish at the Bat"
2002	Monk	Aunt Minn	Episode: "Mr. Monk and the Airplane"
2003	Moville Mysteries	Mountain Marge	Episode: "Something Fishy in Lake Gimmee-Gimmee-Itchee-Owee"
2004–05	Atomic Betty	Miss Dourly	4 episodes
2005	Train 48	Miriam	Episode #1.266
2005	6teen	Mimi	Episode: "Pillow Talk"
2006	Getting Along Famously	Peggy	6 episodes
2006	The Jane Show	Jane's mom	Episode: "Daddy's Home"
2012	I, Martin Short, Goes Home	Princess Anne	Television film
2012	Comedy Bar	Chris' Grandmother	2 episodes
2014	Rocky Road	Fiona Draper	Television film
2015–17	Man Seeking Woman	Patti	19 episodes
2016–19	Schitt's Creek	Wendy Kurtz	6 episodes
2018	Max & Ruby	Katie	Episode: "Max and Ruby's Bunnyhop Parade"
2019	Bigfoot	Mrs. Howzenduffer	Episode: "Community Profile"
2023	Shelved	Unhoused Wendy	Supporting role
