= Tim Kazurinsky =

American actor (born 1950)

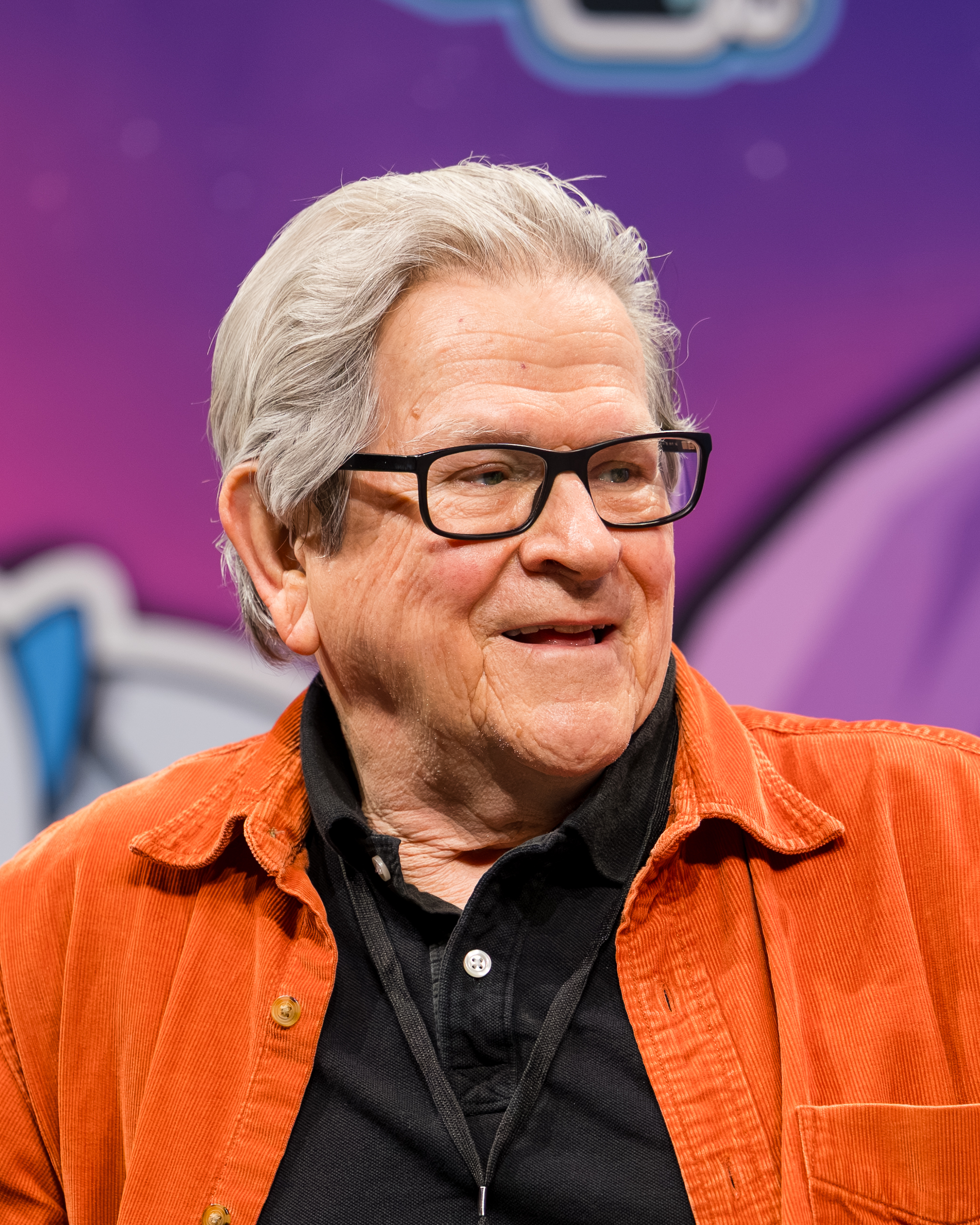
- Kazurinsky at GalaxyCon OKC in 2026
- Born: Timothy James Kazurinsky; March 3, 1950 (age 76); Johnstown, Pennsylvania, U.S.
- Occupations: Actor; screenwriter; comedian
- Years active: 1978–present
- Spouse: Marcia Lynn Watkins
- Children: 2
- Website: timkazurinsky.net

Timothy James Kazurinsky (born March 3, 1950) is an American actor, comedian and screenwriter best known as a cast member and writer on Saturday Night Live and for his role as Carl Sweetchuck in the Police Academy films.

== Early life ==
Kazurinsky was born in Johnstown, Pennsylvania. His father, who was American-born, was of Polish descent, and his mother was an Australian war bride. He spent most of his childhood in Australia, where he attended Birrong Boys High School. When he was 16, he moved to America by himself. He completed his education, graduating from Greater Johnstown High School in 1967.

Kazurinsky worked as a reporter for the Johnstown Tribune-Democrat, then as a copywriter for a St. Louis, Missouri, department store. He moved to Chicago and began working for Leo Burnett Worldwide in its advertising department. Seeking to gain confidence presenting ad pitches, Kazurinsky enrolled in an improv class at The Second City, where he became a member of the mainstage troupe in 1978, refining his improvisation and acting chops under the tutelage of Del Close. Eventually, Kazurinsky caught the attention of Saturday Night Live luminary John Belushi who recommended him to the show's then-executive producer, Dick Ebersol. Ebersol was impressed with Kazurinsky and hired him as a writer and cast member in 1981.

== Saturday Night Live ==
During his three seasons on SNL, Kazurinsky was known for playing numerous characters as well as doing celebrity impersonations. Fellow cast members included Eddie Murphy, Joe Piscopo, Julia Louis-Dreyfus and Mary Gross. Kazurinsky was part of the show's 1984 writing team nominated for a Primetime Emmy Award for Outstanding Writing in a Variety or Music Program. There were reports that he often clashed with Dick Ebersol regarding the show's creative direction. In 1984, Kazurinsky left SNL along with Piscopo. At 2025's Saturday Night Live 50th Anniversary Special, Kazurinsky's four season tenure was mentioned by Adam Sandler in the lyrics of his song, "50 Years-SNL."

=== Recurring characters on SNL ===
- Dr. Jack Badofsky, supposed science editor of Weekend Update, who presented absurd lists of humorous pun-based disease names. Jon Stewart referenced the character in a 2011 Daily Show segment lampooning Herman Cain. The character was again alluded to in a 2016 episode of The Simpsons when Mr. Burns exclaims, "Wordplay is for crosswords and Kazurinskys!"
- Mr. Landlord from "Mr. Robinson's Neighborhood" with Eddie Murphy
- Father Timothy Owens, an Irish priest
- The Iguana, the male half of a hopelessly dorky couple who never revealed to his wife that he was a dangerous adventurer
- Havnagootiim Vishnuuerheer (pronounced "Having a good time wish you were here"), a Hindu "Enlightened Master" who cleared up "The Great Unanswered Questions of the Universe"
- Wayne Huevos, a suave Latin-American businessman who appeared on Weekend Update with ideas on how to clean up New York City
- Worthington Clotman, SNL's resident network censor, based on real-life network censor Bill Clotworthy, who would interrupt sketches and point out objectionable material
- Madge The Chimp's Husband in the recurring soap opera drama "I Married a Monkey"

=== Celebrity impressions on SNL ===
- Mahatma Gandhi (in a movie trailer parody called "Gandhi and the Bandit")
- Billie Jean King
- Adolf Hitler
- Ozzy Osbourne
- Klaus Barbie
- Gary Hart
- Moe Howard
- Douglas MacArthur
- Deng Xiaoping
- Franklin Roosevelt
- Henry Thomas (as his character Elliott from E.T. the Extra-Terrestrial)
- Forrest Gregg

== Other work ==
Kazurinsky had a small part as a photographer in the 1980 Christopher Reeve/Jane Seymour film Somewhere in Time. At the insistence of his friend John Belushi, he played Pa Greavy in the 1981 Belushi/Aykroyd comedy Neighbors. Shortly after departing SNL, Kazurinsky co-wrote About Last Night... based on David Mamet's one act play, Sexual Perversity in Chicago. The film starred Rob Lowe, Demi Moore and Jim Belushi and was directed by Edward Zwick. A remake of About Last Night was released in 2014 starring comedian Kevin Hart. Kazurinsky famously portrayed Officer Carl Sweetchuck in Police Academy 2, 3 and 4, whose character frequently runs into gang leader (later turned officer) Zed McGlunk, played by Bobcat Goldthwait.

In the 1990s, Kazurinsky guest starred in Married... with Children, Early Edition, and Police Academy: The Series. In the 2000s, Kazurinsky wrote for and guest starred in comedy series such as Curb Your Enthusiasm, What About Joan?, Still Standing and According to Jim. In 2001, he wrote the screenplay for Strange Relations, a film starring Paul Reiser, George Wendt, Julie Walters, and Olympia Dukakis. The screenplay was nominated for a Writers Guild of America Award as well as a BAFTA. Kazurinsky played a supporting role in the 2011 Zombie Army Productions film, The Moleman of Belmont Avenue, which also featured Robert Englund.

As a stage actor, Kazurinsky appeared as Felix in The Odd Couple (opposite George Wendt's Oscar), Wilbur Turnblad in Hairspray, and Peter Quince in William Shakespeare's A Midsummer Night's Dream. Kazurinsky's work in Chicago theatre has been recognized by two Joseph Jefferson Award nominations. In February 2014, Kazurinsky joined the first National Tour of the hit musical Wicked in the role of The Wizard, replacing John Davidson. Kazurinsky finished his run on in March 2015 when the First National Tour closed. In May 2015, Kazurinsky made his Broadway debut alongside Jim Parsons and Christopher Fitzgerald in a limited run of David Javerbaum's new comedy, An Act Of God, directed by Joe Mantello between May and August 2015 at Studio 54.

Kazurinsky and George Wendt reunited for the September 2015 world premiere of Bruce Graham's comedy Funnyman at Chicago's Northlight Theatre. The production was directed by BJ Jones. In December 2016, Kazurinsky appeared as Frosch the jailer in Music Theatre Works' production of Johann Strauss II' operetta Die Fledermaus.

Kazurinsky was one of a few people to film Prince's now-legendary impromptu performance of "Let's Go Crazy" at the SNL40 after party in February 2015. The video went viral following Prince's death in 2016 and was shared by numerous media outlets.

In 2017, Kazurinsky played the recurring role of Judge Emerson on NBC's Chicago Justice, and appeared as Father Timothy in Netflix's original series, Easy.

== Personal life ==
Kazurinsky lives outside Chicago with his wife, Broadway actress Marcia Watkins (On Your Toes, A Chorus Line). Kazurinsky has a daughter, Zoe, and a son, Pete.

== Additional filmography ==
- My Bodyguard (1980) - Workman
- Somewhere in Time (1980) - Photographer, in 1912
- Continental Divide (1981) - Reporter
- Neighbors (1981) - Pa Greavy
- Billions for Boris (1984) - Bart
- This Wife for Hire (1985) - Mel Greenfield, M.D.
- Police Academy 2: Their First Assignment (1985) - Sweetchuck, the Merchant
- Police Academy 3: Back in Training (1986) - Cadet Sweetchuck
- About Last Night (1986) - Colin
- Police Academy 4: Citizens on Patrol (1987) - Officer Sweetchuck
- Hot to Trot (1988) - Leonard
- Wedding Band (1989) - Badger Brother #1
- Shakes the Clown (1991) - 1st Party Dad
- The Cherokee Kid (1996) - Gaudy Hawker
- Plump Fiction (1997) - Priscilla, Queen of the Desserts
- The Silencer (1999) - Librarian
- Poor White Trash (2000) - Carlton Rasmeth
- Handicap Hunters (2001) - Narcoleptic
- Strange Relations (2001) - Attending Nurses
- Betaville (2001) - President XM
- Roll Bounce (2005) - Car Salesman
- 8 of Diamonds (2006) - Viggio
- I Want Someone to Eat Cheese With (2006) - Bill Bjango
- Stash (2007) - John Bookenlacher
- Tapioca (2009) - Einstein
- Ca$h (2010) - Chunky Chicken Salesman (uncredited)
- Typing (2010) - Al
- John Belushi: Dancing on the Edge (2010) - Himself
- The Return of Joe Rich (2011) - Petey B
- Close Quarters (2012) - Morris
- Scrooge & Marley (2012) - Marley
- The Moleman of Belmont Avenue (2013) - Harold
- Thrill Ride (2016) - Gus
- Chicago Justice (2017) - Judge Emerson
- Alonso, the Dream and the Call (2017) - Store Patron
- Chasing The Blues (2017) - Marvin Pounder
- Easy (2017) - Father Timothy
- Hope Springs Eternal (2018) - Mr. Melvin Baxter
- Vendors (2019) - Wayne
- Chicago Med (2021) - Sheldon West
- The Road Dog (2023) - Phil

== Screenwriting credits ==
Written with Denise DeClue:

- Big City Comedy (1980)
- About Last Night... (1986)
- For Keeps (1988)
- The Cherokee Kid (1996)
- Relativity (1996)
- Fame L.A. (1997)

Solo work:

- Saturday Night Live (1981-1984)
- Strange Relations (2003)
- According to Jim (2005)
