= Recurring Saturday Night Live characters and sketches introduced 1991–92 =

The following is a list of recurring Saturday Night Live (SNL) characters and sketches introduced between September 28, 1991, and May 16, 1992, the seventeenth season of SNL.

== Tales From The Barbecue ==
An old man (Tim Meadows) tells outlandish tales of acts of barbecue-related heroism he performed when he was younger (Chris Rock). Debuted September 28, 1991.

== Zoraida the NBC Page ==
An Ellen Cleghorne sketch. Zoraida would go backstage with the episode's host and berate them for something about them that peeves her deeply. When the host would walk away to do the next sketch, she'd call out something that implied she didn't mean what she said about the host earlier. Debuted September 28, 1991.

Appearances

Season	Episode	Host	Notes
17	September 28, 1991	Michael Jordan	
17	November 16, 1991	Linda Hamilton	
17	February 8, 1992	Susan Dey	
17	May 16, 1992	Woody Harrelson	
18	October 10, 1992	Joe Pesci	
18	April 17, 1993	Kirstie Alley	

== The Chris Farley Show ==
A Chris Farley sketch. Debuted October 5, 1991.

Appearances

Season	Episode	Host	Notes
17	October 5, 1991	Jeff Daniels	
17	November 16, 1991	Linda Hamilton	guest: Martin Scorsese
18	February 13, 1993	Alec Baldwin	guest: Paul McCartney

== Queen Shenequa ==
Queen Shenequa, played by Ellen Cleghorne, was an Afrocentric social critic who dressed in African garb, observed Kwanzaa, and made commentaries on race. She had a somewhat disdainful persona, such as when she observed about Michael Jackson: "'Black or White'? If it doesn't matter, then why are you so white?", or when she commented that Kwanzaa "is a Swahili word which means 'Santa don't come to my house'". Debuted October 26, 1991.

Appearances

Season	Episode	Host	Notes
17	October 26, 1991	Christian Slater	
17	December 7, 1991	M.C. Hammer	
17	April 11, 1992	Sharon Stone	
17	May 9, 1992	Tom Hanks	
18	September 26, 1992	Nicolas Cage	The Queen Shenequa Show
18	December 5, 1992	Tom Arnold	
18	February 6, 1993	Luke Perry	Dark Moments in Black History
19	October 30, 1993	Christian Slater	

== Mark Strobel ==
A Chris Farley sketch. Debuted November 2, 1991.

== Unfrozen Caveman Lawyer ==
Phil Hartman plays a caveman who was frozen in a glacier, was revived in modern times, and went on to become a corrupt lawyer. Debuted November 23, 1991.

Appearances

Season	Episode	Host	Notes
17	November 23, 1991	Macaulay Culkin	
17	March 14, 1992	John Goodman	
18	January 16, 1993	Harvey Keitel	
21	March 23, 1996	Phil Hartman	

== Dick Clark's Receptionist ==
A David Spade sketch in which various celebrities show up for a meeting with Dick Clark, and his receptionist doesn't recognize them ("And you are ... ?"). Debuted December 7, 1991.

Appearances

Season	Episode	Host	Notes
17	December 7, 1991	M.C. Hammer	
17	February 22, 1992	Roseanne Arnold, Tom Arnold	
19	November 13, 1993	Rosie O'Donnell	

== Theatre Stories ==
Theatre Stories was an SNL skit parodying English actors. Debuted December 14, 1991. It is described by the announcer as produced by the "British-American Theatre Alliance", and centered around several English Shakespearean actors recounting acting experiences and anecdotes. However, one of the most memorable performances was Dana Carvey as embittered former American child star Mickey Rooney, complaining about how the film industry largely turned their back on him, and reminiscing on better times.

Mike Myers played the host, Kenneth Rhys-Evans (a.k.a. "Cucumber Jones"), an English actor who discovered one day that he could not control the volume of his voice (a joke Myers later used in the first Austin Powers movie). Other characters included Steve Martin as an elderly British actor nicknamed "Nobby", because his real name was incredibly long.

Quotes:

- Kenneth: That reminds me of a story that's in no way related. I was working with John Gielgud in a production of Troilus and Cressida, when I discovered I had no control OVER THE VOLUME OF MY VOICE!
- Mickey: I was the number one star... in the world, you hear me? Bang! <kissing noise> In the wooorld.
- Nobby: What a fascinating story you ghastly American! <imitating Mickey> Bang!"
  Mickey: I'm just glad I like women.
  Nobby: What are you getting at?
  Kenneth: Yes, why don't you go off somewhere and have an American 'hot... dog'?
- Kenneth: You gave it a certain, as the French say, "I do not know what".
- Nobby: I remember one time when we were doing a performance of Waiting for Godot during the war, we took a direct hit from a Nazi buzz bomb, and when I looked up and saw the proscenium crashing down on me I screamed and soiled myself.
  Kenneth: Well... who can blame you? I would too if I were in that situation.
  Nobby: No, not then, I mean right now when I said "Ahhh"!

Appearances

Season	Episode	Host	Notes
17	December 14, 1991	Steve Martin	
17	March 14, 1992	John Goodman	
19	October 23, 1993	John Malkovich	
19	May 7, 1994	John Goodman	

== Jan Brady ==
The middle sister from The Brady Bunch, she was portrayed by Melanie Hutsell, who had first played the character in The Real Live Brady Bunch stage show. She would usually begin a commentary on a subject which devolved into a comparison to something that happened on one of the Brady Bunch episodes and her frustration with her siblings who get more attention. Her catchphrase was "Marcia, Marcia, MARCIA!", referring to her older sister in a direct quote from an episode of the popular TV series. Debuted January 11, 1992.

Appearances

Season	Episode	Host	Notes
17	January 11, 1992	Rob Morrow	
17	February 8, 1992	Susan Dey	Partridge Family vs. The Brady Bunch
18	October 24, 1992	Christopher Walken	
18	January 9, 1993	Danny DeVito	

== Delta Delta Delta ==
A Melanie Hutsell, Siobhan Fallon Hogan and Beth Cahill sketch, parodying the sorority Delta Delta Delta. Sometimes the characters would be visited by fraternity members, played by male cast members or guests. The catchphrases were stating "Oh mah Gawd" or answering a phone with "Delta, Delta, Delta, can I help ya, help ya, help ya?" In one crossover, one of the Tri-Delts got poor customer service from the Gap Girls. Debuted January 11, 1992.

Appearances

Season	Episode	Host	Notes
17	January 11, 1992	Rob Morrow	
17	February 22, 1992	Roseanne Arnold, Tom Arnold	
17	March 21, 1992	Mary Stuart Masterson	
17	May 16, 1992	Woody Harrelson	

== Cajun Man ==
Adam Sandler portrayed a man from Cajun country in Louisiana who dressed like Huckleberry Finn and spoke in a heavily exaggerated Cajun French dialect. When interviewed he would simply respond with one or two word answers, ending with "-tion". For example, when asked where his girlfriend is, he would answer "long vacation" and then being asked how he occupies his time, would answer "masturbation." The character is essentially a send-up of TV chef Justin Wilson who specialized in Cajun cuisine, and would frequently enunciate the second syllable in the word "onion". Debuted February 8, 1992.

Appearances

Season	Episode	Host	Notes
17	February 8, 1992	Susan Dey	
17	March 14, 1992	John Goodman	
17	March 21, 1992	Mary Stuart Masterson	
18	October 10, 1992	Joe Pesci	

== The Sensitive Naked Man ==
A Rob Schneider sketch, where Schneider plays a nudist who fails to see the stigma of public nudity. The sketch was shown twice, once with his wife tries to confront him about his nudity at home, another where he is at a ball game with his son. He is sensitive to people's problems, but denies any connection to complaints about his refusal to put some clothes on, not even to the point in the second sketch where he is arrested for indecent exposure. The sketch was discontinued, arguably because of risk of censorship violations. Schneider actually was naked on set. Although he concealed himself such as being behind counters and the like, there were a couple of times his naked rear end was visible to the audience. Debuted February 8, 1992. The second sketch was on May 16, 1992.

== Buster Jenkins ==
A Chris Rock sketch, where he was a Weekend Update commentator giving a story from the perspective of an elderly black man. Debuted February 15, 1992.

== Susan the Transsexual ==
A Phil Hartman sketch. Debuted February 15, 1992.

== Opera Man ==
Opera Man was a Weekend Update character played in the early to middle 1990s by Adam Sandler. He would appear in a tuxedo, white fancy shirt and black-red cape, looking Dracula-esque in appearance. He would do the routine often holding a white handkerchief as a parody of Pavarotti - and sing, opera style, jokes about current events and celebrities. Among Opera Man's sketches, regarding the L.A. Riots: "La Chiefa Policia, no dispatcha gendarme / morono, no respondo / no excusa, bagga doucha!" There was also the self-defensive "Tom Hanks-o/ nominat-o/second time-o/You're a great-o/next year vacacion/go to France-o/give someone else/ a freaking chance-o!" line, during which, on the screen, a picture of Billy Madison came up. The sketches always ended with a big flourish. For example: "I like to sing for you!/ a-that's a-no lie/ Opera man, Bye Bye!" concluding with mock-bravos and roses being flung in Opera Man's direction. Debuted April 18, 1992.

The earlier appearances of Opera Man featured him singing a higher quantity of accurate Italian lyrics, though the subtitles showed the lyrics rather than an English translation. Jon Lovitz showed up in one episode to play his older brother just in from Italy.

Opera Man also once appeared in his own sketch where it was done up like a genuine opera (albeit a very short one), and titled "One Match Short of the Jackpot". Phil Hartman narrates, explaining to the audience that Opera Man has just filled up his car at a gas station and included a New Hampshire Lottery scratch ticket with his purchase. Opera Man gets more excited as every box he scratches off reveal a million dollar prize ("Calmo, relaxo... due more scratcho"), until the last one, at which he prays to God, "Opera Man promiso--no more masturbato!" mismatches and he dejectedly says he must continue his job as a security guard for Montgomery Ward. Sandler briefly reprised Opera Man on SNL's 40th anniversary show in 2015 ("Reunion, reunion, reunion/Lorne has gathered us here together/And no one's getting paid-o!").

Opera Man also performed at the 2001 Concert for New York City.

Appearances

Season	Episode	Host	Notes
17	April 18, 1992	Jerry Seinfeld	
17	May 16, 1992	Woody Harrelson	
18	September 26, 1992	Nicolas Cage	
18	December 12, 1992	Glenn Close	
18	February 6, 1993	Luke Perry	
18	April 17, 1993	Kirstie Alley	
19	October 2, 1993	Shannen Doherty	Scratch Ticket
19	November 13, 1993	Rosie O'Donnell	
19	April 16, 1994	Emilio Estevez	
20	February 18, 1995	Deion Sanders	
40	February 15, 2015	—	Saturday Night Live 40th Anniversary Special. First time Sandler has reprised Opera Man since 2001
44	May 4, 2019	Adam Sandler	

Preceded by Recurring Saturday Night Live characters and sketches introduced 1990–91	Recurring Saturday Night Live characters and sketches (listed chronologically)	Succeeded by Recurring Saturday Night Live characters and sketches introduced 1992–93
