= Recurring Saturday Night Live characters and sketches introduced 1990–91 =

The following is a list of recurring Saturday Night Live characters and sketches introduced between September 29, 1990, and May 18, 1991, the sixteenth season of SNL.

== Larry Roman the Talent Scout ==
A Dana Carvey sketch. Debuted September 29, 1990.

== Simon ==
Simon is a BBC show about a young British boy, played by Mike Myers, who likes to draw. The sketches always begin by showing the BBC logo with a faux British announcer (also Myers) back-announcing some ridiculously insipid-sounding programming on right before it. The show borrows its theme song from a British children's television series called Simon in the Land of Chalk Drawings, though, aside from the concept of a young boy who draws, the premises are completely dissimilar. Simon broadcasts his program from his bathtub, in which he appears to be nude. On the show, Simon displays his drawings (pronounced drawerings in an exaggerated British accent), which he bends over to pick up, whereupon he scolds the audience, by yelling his catch phrases, "Are you looking at my bum?" and calling the audience "Bum Lookers!" and "Cheeky Monkeys!"

His drawings often depict scenes that are disturbing or morbidly violent, presented with a naïve and childlike innocence. His mother is deceased (or, as he refers to it, "my mummy's sleeping with the angels"), and his father is somewhat of a reprobate who associates with nefarious figures (and his "new auntie who sleeps over") and leaves Simon unattended for long periods of time while he gambles. Simon has a typically juvenile sense of humor, juxtaposed with the dark humor of his backstory and drawings. He sometimes has guests on his show, who appear in the bathtub with Simon, and also show their drawings (which are equally as disturbing as Simon's). Simon typically ends his show when he determines that he has been in the tub too long, as indicated by his "prune hands." Debuted November 10, 1990.

Appearances

Season	Episode	Host	Notes
16	November 10, 1990	Jimmy Smits	
17	October 5, 1991	Jeff Daniels	
17	November 23, 1991	Macaulay Culkin	Culkin plays Simon's friend Trevor, who, like Simon, has been neglected by his parents.
18	January 9, 1993	Danny DeVito	DeVito plays Vinny Esposito, a kid whose family is visiting from America. His lines are similar to Simon's ("You lookin' at my ass?", "My mom's swimmin' with the fishes"), but his New York-y demeanor mildly puts Simon off.
19	January 15, 1994	Sara Gilbert	Gilbert plays Kelly Clayton, the unhygienic daughter of Simon's "new auntie who sleeps over".

== The Dark Side with Nat X ==
In the early 1990s, Chris Rock portrayed "Nat X", a militant talk show host with a huge Afro hairstyle. He once remarked that he had only a 15-minute show because, as he explained, if he had any more, "The Man" would regard it as welfare. Many of Rock's original comedy bits were incorporated into Nat X's dialogue.

Segments on The Dark Side include the "White Man Cam" in which a video cam with a police siren sound effect walks up to Nat X's desk and places a graphic image of prison bars in front of him as he screams and mimics being in prison until the White Man Cam goes away. Another segment includes the Top 5 lists because "Ten would make The Man lose sleep.".

Nat X was cruel to all of his guests, "greeting" nearly all of them with, "Sit yo' ass down!" Perhaps the most memorable episode featured host Kevin Bacon as Vanilla Ice. Nat told Ice that he could not dance, and even persuaded his other guest, Colin Powell, to dance with him in order to show Ice how to do it.

When Sinbad hosted, he appeared as Joseph Jackson, who tries to make excuses for the infamous abuse his children suffered, as depicted in the then-current TV miniseries The Jacksons: An American Dream. However, Nat insists on complimenting Jackson for his proficiency with violence, marveling that Jackson "hit Jackie so hard, his Afro wig flew off!"

Spike Lee made a surprise appearance as himself on another episode, donning an "X" cap that was made popular by his film Malcolm X. Not knowing this at first, Nat explained to him that he had been seeing these caps all over town but had personally not seen a dime in profits.

Chris Farley often appeared as "Sandman", a manic clown armed with a broom who swept guests away when Nat had had enough of them. Sandman was modeled after Howard "Sandman" Simms from Showtime at the Apollo, who performed the same function on that show's famed "Amateur Night" episodes, when substandard performers fell short of audience approval.

Appearances

Season	Episode	Host	Notes
16	November 10, 1990	Jimmy Smits	
16	February 9, 1991	Kevin Bacon	
16	April 20, 1991	Steven Seagal	
17	September 28, 1991	Michael Jordan	
17	December 14, 1991	Steve Martin	
17	May 9, 1992	Tom Hanks	
18	November 21, 1992	Sinbad	
22	November 2, 1996	Chris Rock	

== The Doormen ==
A Rob Schneider and Kevin Nealon sketch. Debuted November 10, 1990.

Appearances

Season	Episode	Host	Notes
16	November 10, 1990	Jimmy Smits	
17	December 14, 1991	Steve Martin	

== Pat ==
Julia Sweeney plays an androgynous character. Debuted December 1, 1990.

Appearances

Season	Episode	Host	Notes
16	December 1, 1990	John Goodman	
16	February 16, 1991	Roseanne Barr	
16	April 13, 1991	Catherine O'Hara	Pat at the drugstore
16	May 18, 1991	George Wendt	Pat at the barbershop
17	October 12, 1991	Kirstie Alley	Pat's birthday party
17	November 16, 1991	Linda Hamilton	
17	January 11, 1992	Rob Morrow	
17	April 11, 1992	Sharon Stone	
18	October 10, 1992	Joe Pesci	
18	October 24, 1992	Christopher Walken	
18	January 16, 1993	Harvey Keitel	
18	March 20, 1993	Miranda Richardson	

== Uri Shulenson (Sabra) ==
A Tom Hanks sketch, variations on which included Sabra Shopping Network and Sabra Price is Right. This character was the obnoxious, oversexed owner of an electronics boutique. Debuted December 8, 1990.

== Bill Swerski's Superfans ==
A group of Chicago sports fans discuss upcoming sporting events. Bill Swerski (played by Joe Mantegna) appeared only in the initial sketch. Subsequent editions featured George Wendt as Bill's brother Bob Swerski, who inevitably explained that Bill's absence was due to "another heart attack." Debuted January 12, 1991.

Appearances

Season	Episode	Host	Notes
16	January 12, 1991	Joe Mantegna	
16	May 18, 1991	George Wendt	
17	September 28, 1991	Michael Jordan	
17	November 23, 1991	Macaulay Culkin	
17	January 18, 1992	Chevy Chase	Bob Swerski's Quiz Masters
17	March 21, 1992	Mary Stuart Masterson	Denise Swerski (Beth Cahill) on Weekend Update
17	May 16, 1992	Woody Harrelson	Weekend Update
18	December 5, 1992	Tom Arnold	
18	January 9, 1993	Danny DeVito	An Open Letter to The Chicago Bears. Joe Mantegna reprises his role as Bill Swerski, filling in for an absent Chris Farley.
20	March 25, 1995	John Goodman	Dan Aykroyd appears as Irwin Mainway, Todd's cousin
23	October 25, 1997	Chris Farley	The Super Fans Revisited - Mike Ditka makes an appearance
29	October 18, 2003	Halle Berry	Weekend Update: Bob and Bart Swerski (Horatio Sanz)

== I'm Chillin' ==
I'm Chillin was a spoof of public-access television cable TV rap shows. Its host was played by Chris Rock and the show's sidekick was played by Chris Farley. Farley's character was introduced by Rock with a string of nonsensical rhymes such as "My Ace in the hole, my buttered roll, my grassy knoll, my Esther Rolle" etc. This show was notable for its "Mother Joke of the Day" which would be sent in from (fictitious) viewers, all of whom lived in one housing project or another. The winner would typically receive some early-Nineties-themed gangster item (a red, yellow and green jacket with an 8-ball on the back, for example). Chris Rock's character was named Onski and Chris Farley's character was B-Fats. Onski also plugged local fictitious sponsors, like "Bullet Hole tampons: 'cause sometimes you bleed in other places!", and "F'ed Up Malt Liquor." The sketch usually came to an end when Onski received a beeper page from his "baby's mama" and he'd have to go pick her up somewhere (from work at Popeyes, or the check cashing place). Onski's parting words each episode were "Always wipe, stay off the pipe, and if someone gets in your face, tell em 'I'm Chillin!'" Debuted January 12, 1991.

Appearances

Season	Episode	Host	Notes
16	January 12, 1991	Joe Mantegna	
16	February 23, 1991	Alec Baldwin	
16	May 18, 1991	George Wendt	
17	November 2, 1991	Kiefer Sutherland	
17	April 18, 1992	Jerry Seinfeld	
18	February 20, 1993	Bill Murray	
22	November 2, 1996	Chris Rock	with B Real (Jim Breuer)

== Deep Thoughts ==
Jack Handey offers interstitial one-liners. Debuted January 19, 1991.

== The Elevator Fans ==
A Dana Carvey and Kevin Nealon sketch. Debuted January 19, 1991.

Appearances

Season	Episode	Host	Notes
16	January 19, 1991	Sting	
16	March 16, 1991	Michael J. Fox	
17	September 28, 1991	Michael Jordan	

== The Richmeister (Copy Room Guy, "Makin' Copies!") ==
Rob Schneider plays Richard Laymer, an obnoxious office worker who sits around the copy room all day riffing on the names of his coworkers as they make copies. Debuted January 19, 1991.

Appearances

Season	Episode	Host	Notes
16	January 19, 1991	Sting	
16	February 9, 1991	Kevin Bacon	
16	March 23, 1991	Jeremy Irons	
16	April 20, 1991	Steven Seagal	Presented as an episode of a fictional TV series, Tenelli: One-Man Army, spoofing the name of Seagal's character from Above the Law
17	October 5, 1991	Jeff Daniels	
17	November 23, 1991	Macaulay Culkin	Culkin portrays a younger version of the character in a flashback to his school days.
17	February 8, 1992	Susan Dey	
17	February 15, 1992	Jason Priestley	Richmeister appears in a walk-on cameo during a sketch called "The Life and Times of Johnny Hildo", in which Priestley plays a high school student who is frequently called "The Dildo" due to his last name. As Richmeister walks on, he greets Hildo with "Oh, hey Dildo!"
18	October 31, 1992	Catherine O'Hara	
18	March 13, 1993	John Goodman	

== Coffee Talk with Linda Richman ==
The January 19, 1991 episode introduced a talk show called "Coffee Talk with Paul Baldwin", with Mike Myers playing host Paul Baldwin. However, the sketch was thereafter retooled, becoming "Coffee Talk with Linda Richman" as of its third appearance on October 12, 1991. Mike Myers now played the show's new host, an older Jewish woman.

Appearances

Season	Episode	Host	Notes
16	January 19, 1991	Sting	
16	May 11, 1991	Delta Burke	
17	October 12, 1991	Kirstie Alley	
17	February 22, 1992	Roseanne Arnold, Tom Arnold	
18	December 12, 1992	Glenn Close	
18	February 20, 1993	Bill Murray	
18	May 8, 1993	Christina Applegate	
19	September 25, 1993	Charles Barkley	
19	October 30, 1993	Christian Slater	
19	December 4, 1993	Charlton Heston	
19	January 8, 1994	Jason Patric	
19	March 19, 1994	Helen Hunt	
19	May 14, 1994	Heather Locklear	
20	October 15, 1994	John Travolta	
22	March 22, 1997	Mike Myers	

== Daily Affirmation with Stuart Smalley ==
Al Franken plays the effeminate host of a self-help show. Debuted February 9, 1991. The Stuart Smalley character became the basis for a feature film released in 1995.

Appearances

Season	Episode	Host	Notes
16	February 9, 1991	Kevin Bacon	
16	March 16, 1991	Michael J. Fox	
16	April 13, 1991	Catherine O'Hara	
17	September 28, 1991	Michael Jordan	
17	November 2, 1991	Kiefer Sutherland	
17	November 23, 1991	Macaulay Culkin	
17	February 22, 1992	Roseanne Arnold, Tom Arnold	
18	October 3, 1992	Tim Robbins	
18	October 31, 1992	Catherine O'Hara	
18	December 12, 1992	Glenn Close	
18	February 13, 1993	Alec Baldwin	
19	September 25, 1993	Charles Barkley	
19	November 13, 1993	Rosie O'Donnell	
19	February 19, 1994	Martin Lawrence	
20	October 1, 1994	Marisa Tomei	
20	March 18, 1995	Paul Reiser	
20	May 6, 1995	Bob Saget	
28	December 14, 2002	Al Gore	

== Frank Gannon, P.I. P.I. ==
Kevin Nealon plays a "P.I. P.I.", an abbreviation for "Politically Incorrect Private Investigator." He is a private investigator who is always saying politically incorrect statements, or making politically incorrect conclusions. Debuted April 13, 1991.

Preceded by Recurring Saturday Night Live characters and sketches introduced 1989–90	Recurring Saturday Night Live characters and sketches (listed chronologically)	Succeeded by Recurring Saturday Night Live characters and sketches introduced 1991–92
