= Recurring Saturday Night Live characters and sketches introduced 1989–90 =

The following is a list of recurring Saturday Night Live characters and sketches introduced between September 24, 1989, and May 19, 1990, the fifteenth season of SNL.

== Lank Thompson ==
Mike Myers played Lank Thompson in three different sketches. Thompson was a very handsome man who marketed a line of videos to help men look and act more handsomely. Debuted October 21, 1989.

Appearances

Season	Episode	Host	Notes
15	October 21, 1989	Kathleen Turner	Lank Thompson: I'm a Handsome Man
16	February 23, 1991	Alec Baldwin	Lank Thompson: I'm a Handsome Actor
17	April 18, 1992	Jerry Seinfeld	Lank Thompson: I'm a Handsome Black Man

== The Tonight Show Starring Johnny Carson ==
A parody of The Tonight Show Starring Johnny Carson, with Dana Carvey impersonating Johnny Carson and Phil Hartman impersonating Ed McMahon.

Appearances

Season	Episode	Host	Notes
15	October 28, 1989	James Woods	Guests: Victoria Jackson (as herself) and Nancy Reagan (Jan Hooks).
15	January 20, 1990	Christopher Walken	McMahon doesn't show up personally, so his intro is played on a tape recorder placed on his seat. Guests: Andrew Dice Clay (Jon Lovitz) and Mikhail Gorbachev (Hartman).
15	May 19, 1990	Candice Bergen	Guests: Crystal McClanahan (Hooks) and Jay Leno (Kevin Nealon).
16	October 27, 1990	Patrick Swayze	Guests: Susan Dey (Hooks) and Arsenio Hall (Chris Rock).
16	May 18, 1991	George Wendt	The Carsenio Show: Johnny Carson attempts to make his show more hip (a la The Arsenio Hall Show), but both he and McMahon fail ("Is that hip? Am I being hip?"). Wendt (as himself) is the guest.
17	October 5, 1991	Jeff Daniels	Guests: Jay Leno (Daniels), Victoria Jackson (as herself), Dom DeLuise (Chris Farley), Burt Reynolds (Hartman), and Joan Embery (Julia Sweeney).
17	May 16, 1992	Woody Harrelson	Guests: Arsenio Hall (Rock), Jay Leno (Nealon), David Brenner (Adam Sandler), Dennis Miller (Carvey), and Joan Embery (Sweeney).
20	October 22, 1994	Dana Carvey	The OJ Trial

== Lyle the Effeminate Heterosexual ==
An effeminate character played by Dana Carvey who needs to convince others that he is not gay. Debuted November 11, 1989.

Appearances

Season	Episode	Host	Notes
15	November 11, 1989	Chris Evert	
17	March 21, 1992	Mary Stuart Masterson	

== Annoying Man ==
Portrayed by Jon Lovitz, he spoke in a high-pitched nasal voice and did annoying things in front of Weekend Update's Dennis Miller, such as chewing with his mouth open, or scratching a fork across a slate chalkboard. These sketches often ended with Lovitz saying something in a calm, cultured, refined tone; for example, "You don't have to yell" or "I love you." Debuted November 11, 1989.

Appearances

Season	Episode	Host	Notes
15	November 11, 1989	Chris Evert	
15	December 2, 1989	John Goodman	
15	January 20, 1990	Christopher Walken	
15	February 24, 1990	Fred Savage	
15	March 17, 1990	Rob Lowe	
15	May 12, 1990	Andrew Dice Clay	
16	December 15, 1990	Dennis Quaid	

== Singing Cowboys ==
A Dana Carvey and Phil Hartman sketch.

Appearances

Season	Episode	Host	Notes
15	November 18, 1989	Woody Harrelson	
16	September 29, 1990	Kyle MacLachlan	
16	March 23, 1991	Jeremy Irons	
17	January 11, 1992	Rob Morrow	
17	May 16, 1992	Woody Harrelson	

== Hanukkah Harry ==
Jon Lovitz plays a Jewish variation of Santa Claus. Debuted December 16, 1989.

Appearances

Season	Episode	Host	Notes
15	December 16, 1989	Andie MacDowell	
15	April 14, 1990	Corbin Bernsen	

== The Continental ==
Christopher Walken plays a self-imagined ladies' man. Debuted January 20, 1990.

Appearances

Season	Episode	Host	Notes
15	January 20, 1990	Christopher Walken	
18	October 24, 1992	Christopher Walken	
21	January 13, 1996	Christopher Walken	
25	April 8, 2000	Christopher Walken	
26	May 19, 2001	Christopher Walken	
28	February 22, 2003	Christopher Walken	

== Middle-Aged Man ==
Mike Myers portrays Ed Miles, a nominal superhero in late middle age whose superpower is elder wisdom; he solves young adults' mundane life problems. Chris Farley plays Miles's sidekick, Drinking Buddy. Each episode features a full theme song and introduction, with Don Pardo announcing the episode's title. Debuted April 21, 1990.

Appearances

Season	Episode	Host	Notes
15	April 21, 1990	Alec Baldwin	
16	October 20, 1990	George Steinbrenner	
16	May 18, 1991	George Wendt	

Preceded by Recurring Saturday Night Live characters and sketches introduced 1988-89	Recurring Saturday Night Live characters and sketches (listed chronologically)	Succeeded by Recurring Saturday Night Live characters and sketches introduced 1990-91
