= Saturday Night Live season 18 =

Saturday Night Live
- Season 18
- No. of episodes: 20

Release
- Original network: NBC
- Original release: September 26, 1992 – May 15, 1993

Season chronology
- ← Previous season 17 Next → season 19

The eighteenth season of Saturday Night Live, an American sketch comedy series, originally aired in the United States on NBC between September 26, 1992, and May 15, 1993.

== Cast ==
Many changes happened before the start of the season. Long-term cast member Victoria Jackson left the show after six seasons. Newer cast members Beth Cahill and Siobhan Fallon were both fired. Lorne Michaels did not hire any new cast members. Rob Schneider was upgraded to repertory status. Ellen Cleghorne, Tim Meadows, Adam Sandler and David Spade remained in the middle category. Melanie Hutsell was promoted to the middle category and Robert Smigel stayed a featured player.

Mike Myers would miss the first seven episodes of the season, due to filming the movie So I Married an Axe Murderer.

Long-term cast member Dana Carvey would leave midseason; he originally planned to leave in the fall of 1992, but he ended up staying until the February 6, 1993 episode, leaving after roughly seven seasons in the cast. This would also be the final season for cast members Chris Rock and Smigel.

After three years with the show, Rock quit at the end of the season, joining the much more diverse sketch comedy show In Living Color. Of his time on SNL, Rock had been frustrated with his lack of creative freedom and air time. In the oral history Live from New York, Rock said, "The good thing about me being on In Living Color, I got things on that had nothing to do with race. On SNL, I either had to play a militant or a hip-hop guy. If you watch my stand-up, race is ten minutes of an hour-long show. I talk about relationships, whatever. And Living Color allowed me to talk about other shit. I could do sketches about, you know, funny stores I was in." Writer and featured player Smigel left to become the head writer for Late Night with Conan O'Brien.

This season was also home to one of SNL's most infamous moments: Sinéad O'Connor tore a photograph of Pope John Paul II at the end of her second singing performance.

=== Cast roster ===
**Repertory players**

- Dana Carvey (final episode: February 6, 1993)
- Chris Farley
- Phil Hartman
- Mike Myers (on leave until December 5, 1992)
- **Kevin Nealon**
- Chris Rock
- Rob Schneider
- Julia Sweeney

**Middle players**

- Ellen Cleghorne
- Melanie Hutsell
- Tim Meadows
- Adam Sandler
- David Spade

**Featured players**

- Al Franken
- Robert Smigel

bold denotes Weekend Update anchor

In this season, middle players were announced as "featuring", and featured players were announced as "with". All middle players were promoted to the repertory cast for the following season, abolishing the category and allowing the featured players to be announced by that name again. All of the middle tier cast members were credited in every single episode of the season, while featured players are only credited in certain episodes; Robert Smigel is featured in the opening credits of six episodes, while Al Franken is featured in the opening for four episodes. Don Novello is credited as "Father Guido Sarducci" in the third cast member category for the Bill Murray episode in which he guest stars but isn't considered a featured player because this was a one-off guest appearance.

== Writers ==
David Mandel (a future writer/producer of Seinfeld, Curb Your Enthusiasm, and Veep) and Ian Maxtone-Graham (a future writer for The Simpsons) join the writing staff this season.

Starting with the John Goodman-hosted episode, original-era writer Marilyn Suzanne Miller (who previously wrote for the first three seasons from 1975 to 1978; and again for the 1981-82 season) returns as a writer.

This season is more notable for being the final season for several longtime/veteran writers including Robert Smigel (who had been a writer for eight years since 1985), Jack Handey (who had been a writer for seven accumulative years since 1985, with the exception of season 12), Bonnie and Terry Turner, and Christine Zander (the later three of whom, had been writers for 6½ years since 1987). (Although Smigel and Handey would return to the show in later seasons).

Then-head writer Jim Downey would blame the declining quality of the following seasons on all of the veteran writers departing.

== Episodes ==
No. overall	No. in season	Host	Musical guest(s)	Original release date
327	1	Nicolas Cage	Bobby Brown	September 26, 1992
Bobby Brown performs "Humpin' Around" and "Good Enough". Brown also appeared in the "Queen Shenequa Show" sketch.; Jan Hooks appears in the cold open and the "Nightline" sketch.; Cher appears during Weekend Update.; One of the final sketches of the night is a satire of the famous Murphy Brown episode that aired that week responding to Dan Quayle's comments. Lorne Michaels does a cold open to the camera explaining that Quayle had, during their summer hiatus, criticized the Rob Schneider running character "Mr. Casual Sex" and they would now like to respond – the joke being that this character had never existed until that moment, though he has an introductory theme song. This is followed by a sketch of Mr. Casual Sex being criticized for his morality, followed by endless pedantic jokes about the spelling of potato, and culminating in Mr. Casual Sex being joined by an array of men who like casual sex to proudly stand up to Quayle (a la the ending of the Murphy Brown episode).
328	2	Tim Robbins	Sinéad O'Connor	October 3, 1992
Credited Third Category Featured Players: Al Franken, Robert Smigel; Sinéad O'Connor performs "Success Has Made a Failure of Our Home" and the Bob Marley song "War".; After four minutes of a capella during O'Connor's second song, "War", she exclaims "child abuse" several times and then holds up a picture of Pope John Paul II, and says, "Fight the real enemy," tearing the picture to pieces. During the earlier rehearsal taping, O'Connor held up a picture of a starving African child before leaving the stage. Director Dave Wilson gave the order to not light up the audience applause light following "War," as he felt she had "railroaded" the crew and producers. The segment, which aired nearly a decade before the world became fully aware of the prolific sexual abuse of children in the Catholic Church, marked one of only a few times that a sketch or performance ended with a quiet studio. NBC received 4,484 complaints about O'Connor, and 725 calls supporting her.; Susan Sarandon appears during the goodnights.
329	3	Joe Pesci	Spin Doctors	October 10, 1992
Spin Doctors perform "Little Miss Can't Be Wrong" and "Jimmy Olsen's Blues".; During his monologue, Joe Pesci displays the photo of Pope John Paul II that Sinéad O'Connor had infamously destroyed during the previous week's episode, now taped back together.; Pesci's frequent collaborators, Robert De Niro and Martin Scorsese, appear in the "Backstage" sketch.
330	4	Christopher Walken	Arrested Development	October 24, 1992
Arrested Development performs "Tennessee" and "People Everyday".; Jan Hooks appears during the monologue, the "Stalk Talk" sketch, and portrays Sinéad O'Connor in two sketches.
331	5	Catherine O'Hara	10,000 Maniacs	October 31, 1992
Credited Third Category Featured Player: Al Franken; 10,000 Maniacs perform "These Are Days" and "Candy Everybody Wants".
332	6	Michael Keaton	Morrissey	November 14, 1992
Credited Third Category Featured Player: Robert Smigel; Morrissey performs "Glamorous Glue" and "Suedehead".
333	7	Sinbad	Sade	November 21, 1992
Sade performs "No Ordinary Love" and "Cherish the Day".; Adam Sandler debuts "The Thanksgiving Song" during the Weekend Update segment.
334	8	Tom Arnold	Neil Young	December 5, 1992
Credited Third Category Featured Players: Robert Smigel; Neil Young performs "From Hank to Hendrix" and "Harvest Moon" from Harvest Moon.; Roseanne Barr appears during "Weekend Update".; Dick Butkus and George Wendt appear during the "Bill Swerski's Super Fans" sketch.; Mike Myers returns from hiatus in this episode.; Gary Oldman was scheduled to host this episode but dropped out for unknown reasons.
335	9	Glenn Close	The Black Crowes	December 12, 1992
Credited Third Category Featured Players: Al Franken; The Black Crowes performs "Sometimes Salvation" and "Non-Fiction".; Jon Lovitz cameos during "Weekend Update".; Mary Beth Hurt appears in the "Lesbian Christmas Party" sketch.; Dana Carvey is absent from this episode.
336	10	Danny DeVito	Bon Jovi	January 9, 1993
Bon Jovi performs "Bed of Roses" and "Wanted Dead or Alive". Jon Bon Jovi also appears in the "Adults Living at Home" sketch.; Mike Ditka, Joe Mantegna and George Wendt appear in the cold open.; Jan Hooks appears in the "House of Buttafuoco" sketch and the "Unbelievable New Breakthroughs" sketch.; Dana Carvey does not appear in this episode, but is credited in the opening montage.; Robert Smigel appears in the opening sketch but isn't credited in the opening montage.; Him and Franken are credited in reruns, though
337	11	Harvey Keitel	Madonna	January 16, 1993
Madonna performs "Fever" and "Bad Girl". During "Bad Girl," she imitated Sinéad O'Connor's actions from earlier in the season by ripping a photo of Joey Buttafuoco and yelling "Fight the real enemy". She additionally appeared in the cold open.; Jan Hooks appears as Hillary Clinton in the cold open.
338	12	Luke Perry	Mick Jagger	February 6, 1993
Mick Jagger performs "Sweet Thing" and "Don't Tear Me Up". He also appears on "Weekend Update" as Keith Richards and during the "Tampon Prince" sketch.; Jan Hooks (as Hillary Clinton) and Giorgio Armani (as himself) appear in the cold open.; Dana Carvey's final episode as a cast member.; This episode re-aired on March 9, 2019 as a tribute to Luke Perry, who had died five days earlier.
339	13	Alec Baldwin	Paul McCartney	February 13, 1993
Credited Third Category Featured Players: Al Franken; Paul McCartney performs "Get Out of My Way" and "Biker Like an Icon" from Off the Ground, as well as The Beatles song "Hey Jude". Paul McCartney appears during the monologue, the "Mimic" sketch, "The Chris Farley Show" sketch, and "Weekend Update".; Linda McCartney performs alongside Paul McCartney during the musical segments and appears during "Weekend Update".
340	14	Bill Murray	Sting	February 20, 1993
Credited Third Category Featured Players: Robert Smigel, Father Guido Sarducci; Sting performs "If I Ever Lose My Faith in You", "Love Is Stronger Than Justice (The Munificent Seven)", and "Every Breath You Take". He also appears as Rod Stewart during the cold open.; Steve Martin appears during "Weekend Update" on "Hollywood Minute."; Don Novello appears as Father Guido Sarducci during "Weekend Update."
341	15	John Goodman	Mary J. Blige	March 13, 1993
Mary J. Blige performs "Reminisce" and "Sweet Thing". Blige's mother Cora appears during the goodnights.; The Bravados appear during the monologue.
342	16	Miranda Richardson	Soul Asylum	March 20, 1993
Soul Asylum performs "Somebody to Shove" and "Black Gold".; Miranda Richardson's The Crying Game co-star Stephen Rea appears during the cold open.; Marv Albert appears during the pre-recorded "Dieter's Dream" sketch.
343	17	Jason Alexander	Peter Gabriel	April 10, 1993
Credited Third Category Featured Players: Robert Smigel; Peter Gabriel performs "Steam" and "In Your Eyes".; Writer Warren Hutcherson appears in "Black Co-Workers" sketch as African Tribal Representative
344	18	Kirstie Alley	Lenny Kravitz	April 17, 1993
Lenny Kravitz performs "Are You Gonna Go My Way" and "Always on the Run".; Prince and the New Power Generation were originally the musical guest in this episode.
345	19	Christina Applegate	Midnight Oil	May 8, 1993
Midnight Oil performs "Truganini" and "My Country".; This episode features the first Matt Foley sketch.
346	20	Kevin Kline	Willie Nelson & Paul Simon	May 15, 1993
Credited Third Category Featured Players: Robert Smigel; Willie Nelson and Paul Simon performs "Graceland" and "Still Is Still Moving To Me".; Jan Hooks and Dan Aykroyd appear as Hillary Clinton and Bob Dole during the cold open.; Chris Rock and Robert Smigel's final episode as cast members.

== Specials ==
Title	Original release date
"SNL Presidential Bash"	November 1, 1992
This special featured some of SNL's best political sketches throughout its 18-year run. Dana Carvey and Phil Hartman hosted the special as George Bush, Ross Perot and Bill Clinton, respectively. Sketches include "The Pepsi Syndrome", "Ask President Carter", "Debate '92", and "Stockdale's Joyride".
"2nd Annual Saturday Night Live Mother's Day Special"	May 9, 1993
A Mother's Day special featuring the SNL ensemble with their real-life mothers as well as a compilation of sketches from the 1992-93 season. Includes guest appearances by David Dinkins, George Steinbrenner, Regis Philbin, Kathie Lee Gifford, Larry Gatlin, and Donald Trump.

== Coneheads film ==
Coneheads, a film based on the popular Coneheads sketches that appeared on the show in the 1970s, was released on July 23, 1993. Cast members Dan Aykroyd, Peter Aykroyd, Jane Curtin, Chris Farley, Phil Hartman, Jan Hooks, Jon Lovitz, Michael McKean, Tim Meadows, Garret Morris, Kevin Nealon, Laraine Newman, Adam Sandler, David Spade, and Julia Sweeney all appear in the film. The film did not do well at the box office and was largely panned by critics.
