= Saturday Night Live season 19 =

Saturday Night Live
- Season 19
- No. of episodes: 20

Release
- Original network: NBC
- Original release: September 25, 1993 – May 14, 1994

Season chronology
- ← Previous season 18 Next → season 20

The nineteenth season of Saturday Night Live, an American sketch comedy series, originally aired in the United States on NBC between September 25, 1993, and May 14, 1994.

== Cast ==
Many changes happened to the cast before the start of the season.

Dana Carvey had left the show in the middle of the previous season. Chris Rock and Robert Smigel also left the show at the end of the previous season. Ellen Cleghorne, Melanie Hutsell, Tim Meadows, Adam Sandler, and David Spade were all promoted to repertory status. Stand-up comics Norm Macdonald, Jay Mohr and Sarah Silverman were hired as writers and would debut as featured players, a few episodes into the season. Veteran comic actor Michael McKean joined the show midseason as a repertory cast member. At 46, McKean became the oldest person to join the cast of the show (George Coe was also 46 yet McKean's 47th birthday was less than a month away from his first appearance). It was a distinction he held until Leslie Jones became a cast member (at age 47) in 2014.

This would be the final season for longtime cast members Phil Hartman, Rob Schneider, Julia Sweeney and Melanie Hutsell. This was also the only season for Sarah Silverman.

A major blow for the show was the departure of Hartman. Before his final show the entire cast and crew presented him with a bronzed stick of glue, symbolizing how he had become "The Glue" of the show, a term coined by Adam Sandler.

This was the final season to show StereoSurround captioning during the opening montage.

This is also the first season to feature the show returning to the "repertory" and "featured" cast lists since season 15.

=== Cast roster ===
**Repertory players**

- Ellen Cleghorne
- Chris Farley
- Phil Hartman
- Melanie Hutsell
- Michael McKean (first episode: March 12, 1994)
- Tim Meadows
- Mike Myers
- **Kevin Nealon**
- Adam Sandler
- Rob Schneider
- David Spade
- Julia Sweeney

**Featured players**

- Al Franken
- Norm Macdonald (first episode: October 9, 1993)
- Jay Mohr (first episode: October 9, 1993)
- Sarah Silverman (first episode: November 13, 1993)

bold denotes Weekend Update anchor

Norm Macdonald and Jay Mohr were each credited in the open montage for 14 of the season's 20 episodes, whereas Sarah Silverman was credited for 10 episodes and Al Franken was credited for three episodes.

== Writers ==
Several veteran writers, among them Robert Smigel, Jack Handey, and Bonnie and Terry Turner, left the staff prior to the season. Head writer Jim Downey later attributed part of the season's drop in quality and the negative reception of season 20 to the turnovers among the writing staff and cast.

New writers hired included stand-up comedians Dave Attell, Norm Macdonald, Jay Mohr, and Sarah Silverman (the latter three would join the cast, as featured players a few episodes into the season); as well as Lewis Morton, Steve Lookner, and Tony DeSena. This would be the only season for Attell, Silverman, and DeSena.

Fred Wolf joins the writing staff with the John Malkovich hosted episode.

Tim Herlihy (a security lawyer, and friend of Adam Sandler) was added to the writing staff, with the Nancy Kerrigan-hosted episode.

This was also the final season for longtime/original writer Tom Davis (who initially wrote for the show from 1975 to 1980; and had been back writing for the show since 1985), as he left the show after 14 accumulative years.

== Episodes ==
| No. overall | No. in season | Host(s) | Musical guest | Original release date |
|---|---|---|---|---|
| 347 | 1 | Charles Barkley | Nirvana | September 25, 1993 |
Credited Featured Players: Al Franken; Nirvana performs "Heart-Shaped Box" and "Rape Me".; Muggsy Bogues appears during the "Daily Affirmation" sketch and the "Charles Barkley's Big, Tall & Black Men's Stores" sketch.; Skid Row appears in a pre-recorded segment of the "Gap" sketch.; RuPaul appears during the "What's That?" sketch.; Contains an "Office Space" cartoon by Mike Judge
| 348 | 2 | Shannen Doherty | Cypress Hill | October 2, 1993 |
Credited Featured Players: (none); Cypress Hill performs "Insane in the Brain" and "I Ain't Goin' Out Like That". They would end up banned from the show after DJ Muggs lit up and smoked a marijuana joint on stage during the latter performance.; Doherty's then-husband Ashley Hamilton appears during the monologue.
| 349 | 3 | Jeff Goldblum | Aerosmith | October 9, 1993 |
Credited Featured Players: Norm Macdonald, Jay Mohr; Aerosmith performs "Cryin'" and "Sweet Emotion". The band also appears during the "Bad Dancer" sketch, Steven Tyler and Joe Perry appear during the cold open, and Tyler appears during the "Karl's Video" sketch.; Goldblum's Jurassic Park co-star Laura Dern appears during the monologue.; Norm Macdonald and Jay Mohr's first episodes as featured players.
| 350 | 4 | John Malkovich | Billy Joel | October 23, 1993 |
Credited Featured Players: (none); Billy Joel performs "The River of Dreams" and "All About Soul".; Jan Hooks receives a "special guest appearance by" credit in the opening montage and appears during the "Of Mice and Men" sketch, and as Hillary Clinton during the "Carville" sketch.
| 351 | 5 | Christian Slater | The Smashing Pumpkins | October 30, 1993 |
Credited Featured Players: Jay Mohr; The Smashing Pumpkins perform "Today" and "Cherub Rock".
| 352 | 6 | Rosie O'Donnell | James Taylor | November 13, 1993 |
Credited Featured Players: Al Franken, Norm Macdonald, Jay Mohr, Sarah Silverman; James Taylor performs "Memphis" & "Slap Leather" and "Secret O' Life". Both performances feature musician Don Grolnick. James Taylor also appears during the "Duets" sketch.; Casey Kasem appears during the "Duets" sketch.; Sarah Silverman's first episode as a featured player.
| 353 | 7 | Nicole Kidman | Stone Temple Pilots | November 20, 1993 |
Credited Featured Players: (none); Stone Temple Pilots perform "Creep" and "Naked Sunday".; Dana Carvey appears during the "Wayne's World" cold open and as Ross Perot during the "United We Stand America" sketch.; Christina Ricci and Jimmy Workman appear during the "Yelling in the Kitchen" sketch.
| 354 | 8 | Charlton Heston | Paul Westerberg | December 4, 1993 |
Featured Players: Norm Macdonald, Jay Mohr, Sarah Silverman (opening credits do not feature any actual actor names due to the Planet of the Apes gag, but these three all appeared in the episode); Paul Westerberg performs "Knockin' On Mine" and "Can't Hardly Wait".; The opening montage has the cast members made over to look like apes to coincide with a running gag from the cold opening parodying Planet of the Apes.
| 355 | 9 | Sally Field | Tony! Toni! Toné! | December 11, 1993 |
Credited Featured Players: Norm Macdonald; Tony! Toni! Tone! performs "If I Had No Loot" and "Tell Me Mama". Both performances feature Lili Haydn.
| 356 | 10 | Jason Patric | Blind Melon | January 8, 1994 |
Credited Featured Players: Norm Macdonald, Jay Mohr, Sarah Silverman; Blind Melon performs "No Rain" and "Paper Scratcher". The band also appears during the monologue.; Richard Simmons appears during the "Coffee Talk" sketch.
| 357 | 11 | Sara Gilbert | Counting Crows | January 15, 1994 |
Credited Featured Players: Norm Macdonald, Jay Mohr, Sarah Silverman; Counting Crows perform "Round Here" and "Mr. Jones".
| 358 | 12 | Patrick Stewart | Salt-N-Pepa | February 5, 1994 |
Credited Featured Players: Norm Macdonald; Salt-N-Pepa perform "Shoop" and "Whatta Man"; notably, Stewart's introduction of the duo for the first performance would regain popularity in 2018 when John Mulaney would perform a stand-up routine pointing out his intense emphasis on the band's name, such that even Stewart himself would acknowledge it ahead of the show's 50th anniversary celebration in 2025.; Bernie Kopell (Doc from The Love Boat) makes a cameo during a Love Boat-themed parody of Star Trek: The Next Generation.
| 359 | 13 | Alec Baldwin and Kim Basinger | UB40 | February 12, 1994 |
Credited Featured Players: Norm Macdonald, Jay Mohr, Sarah Silverman; UB40 performs "C'est La Vie" and "Can't Help Falling in Love".; Baldwin's brothers Stephen and Billy appear during the "Family Feud" sketch.; This episode features the infamous sketch where Adam Sandler's Canteen Boy is molested by his scoutmaster (played by Alec Baldwin).
| 360 | 14 | Martin Lawrence | Crash Test Dummies | February 19, 1994 |
Credited Featured Players: Al Franken, Norm Macdonald, Jay Mohr; Crash Test Dummies perform "Mmm Mmm Mmm Mmm" and "Afternoons & Coffeespoons".; Lawrence's opening monologue included explicit material on "feminine hygiene" and has been partially censored in all reruns (including the Netflix collection of SNL episodes from the 1990s) with an explanatory voice-over, stating that Lawrence's views and opinions are not shared by anyone at NBC, the monologue nearly got everyone on the show fired for not stopping it, and that Martin Lawrence has been banned from ever appearing, or even being mentioned, on the show again. NBC received 627 complaints about the monologue, while only three calls were in support of Lawrence.; Benoit Benjamin appears in the "13th Player" sketch.
| 361 | 15 | Nancy Kerrigan | Aretha Franklin | March 12, 1994 |
Credited Featured Players: Norm Macdonald, Jay Mohr, Sarah Silverman; Aretha Franklin performs "A Deeper Love", "Willing to Forgive", and "Chain of Fools". She also appears during the "Black Rhythm & Blues Singers Today" sketch.; Michael McKean's first episode as a cast member.
| 362 | 16 | Helen Hunt | Snoop Doggy Dogg | March 19, 1994 |
Credited Featured Players: Norm Macdonald, Jay Mohr, Sarah Silverman; Snoop Dogg performs "Gin and Juice" and "Lodi Dodi".; Cindy Crawford appears during the cold open.; Contains an "Office Space" cartoon by Mike Judge
| 363 | 17 | Kelsey Grammer | Dwight Yoakam | April 9, 1994 |
Credited Featured Players: Norm Macdonald, Jay Mohr, Sarah Silverman; Dwight Yoakam performs "Pocket of a Clown" and "Fast as You".; Jan Hooks appears as Hillary Clinton during the cold open.; Sy Sperling appears during the monologue and the "Yankee Stadium Opening Day" sketch.; Manute Bol appears in the pre-recorded "Majestic Caribbean Cruise Line" sketch.
| 364 | 18 | Emilio Estevez | Pearl Jam | April 16, 1994 |
Credited Featured Players: Norm Macdonald, Jay Mohr; Pearl Jam performs "Not for You," "Rearviewmirror" and "Daughter". During the goodnights, Eddie Vedder lifts his jacket to reveal the letter K written on his shirt as a tribute to Kurt Cobain, who died eleven days earlier.
| 365 | 19 | John Goodman | The Pretenders | May 7, 1994 |
Credited Featured Players: Jay Mohr, Sarah Silverman; The Pretenders perform "Night in My Veins" and "I'll Stand By You".; Jan Hooks appears as Hillary Clinton in the "Cops" sketch.; Manute Bol appears in the pre-recorded "Majestic Caribbean Cruise Line" sketch.; When this episode was announced during the April 16, 1994 episode, Heather Locklear was booked as the original host.
| 366 | 20 | Heather Locklear | Janet Jackson | May 14, 1994 |
Credited Featured Players: Norm Macdonald, Jay Mohr, Sarah Silverman; Janet Jackson performs "Throb" and "Any Time, Any Place".; Jay Leno appears during the monologue.; Kevin Nealon's final episode as Weekend Update anchor.; Phil Hartman, Melanie Hutsell, Rob Schneider, Sarah Silverman and Julia Sweeney's final episode as cast members. Hartman was presented with a bronzed stick of glue, symbolizing how he had become "The Glue" of the show, a term coined by Adam Sandler.

== Specials ==
| # | Special | Original airdate |
|---|---|---|
| 1 | "The President's Favorite Moments" | May 17, 1994 |
A clip show featuring material from previous shows.

== Wayne's World 2 film ==
Wayne's World 2, the sequel to the 1992 hit Wayne's World, was released on December 10, 1993. Based on the popular "Wayne's World" sketches, the film stars cast members Dana Carvey, Chris Farley, Tim Meadows, Mike Myers and Harry Shearer. SNL writers Bob Odenkirk and Robert Smigel have brief cameos as concert nerds. The film did not do as well at the box office as its predecessor, grossing less than half of what the original did. It received generally positive reviews from critics, with Roger Ebert calling the characters of Wayne and Garth "impossible to dislike".

== It's Pat film ==
It's Pat, a film based on the popular Pat sketches, was released on August 26, 1994. Cast members Tim Meadows, Charles Rocket and Julia Sweeney appear in the film. The film was a box office bomb, barely making $50,000. The film was also panned by critics and has a rare 0% rating on Rotten Tomatoes, based on 11 reviews.
