= Coffee Talk (Saturday Night Live) =

Series of sketches on Saturday Night Live

Mike Myers, Madonna and Roseanne Barr as their characters

"Coffee Talk" is a series of sketches performed by Mike Myers on the sketch comedy show Saturday Night Live. It ran from January 19, 1991, until October 15, 1994, although Myers (who had since left the show) reprised the role on March 22, 1997, and again during the Saturday Night Live 50th Anniversary Special on February 16, 2025.

In most of the sketches, Myers plays a stereotypical Jewish middle-aged woman with an exaggerated New York accent who sports long, painted fake nails; much gold jewelry; gaudy sweaters; large dark glasses; and big hair, which she constantly adjusts. This character was a spoof on Myers' real-life mother-in-law at the time, Linda Richman.

== Paul Baldwin period ==
Introduced on the January 19, 1991 episode, this sketch was originally called "Coffee Talk with Paul Baldwin", with Baldwin played by Mike Myers. The main joke was the use of as many words that accentuated the stereotypical New York accent as possible, particularly the low back chain shift that changes the vowels in words like "dogs, daughters, lofts and coffee" as Baldwin describes the show's preferred topics.

Starting with the October 12, 1991 episode, Paul Baldwin was written out and replaced with the character of Richman as the substitute host. In subsequent episodes, Richman explains that Baldwin is a good friend of hers and is recuperating in Boca Raton, Florida, because "he developed shpilkis in his ganektagazoink".

== Ongoing gags ==
=== Streisand fixation ===
Richman's hero was Barbra Streisand. She constantly "dedicated" the show to her, often claiming her to be the greatest actress in all of history.

In what could be considered to be the sketch's most memorable moment, Myers was joined on February 22, 1992 by special guests Madonna and Roseanne Barr as other stereotypical Jewish women. Madonna also lampooned herself by having her character attack Madonna as a bad example for teenage Jewish girls ("She's a tramp. Every week with the different boyfriend! And this week in the papers with no clothes on! Who needs her? Feh!!"), referring to the hitchhiking scene from Madonna's "Erotica" video. They discussed Streisand's film The Prince of Tides (1991) on the show.

Near the end of the sketch, the women compared Streisand to "buttah" – and suddenly, a voice announced, "All this talk about food, I'm getting hungry, girls." It was Streisand herself in a surprise appearance; none of the actors had any idea that she was to appear. All three managed to remain in character as the audience went wild. (Myers as Richman screamed, "I can die now! That's all the time we have for this week; I have to go and die now!") The real Richman, sitting in the audience that night to watch her then son-in-law lampoon her, has acknowledged having been "tickled to death" at that particular moment, as Streisand is one of her actual heroes as well.

Streisand only stayed long enough to give each character a kiss and wave to the audience. Streisand later revealed that she had been giving a performance at Radio City Music Hall (which is located across West 50th Street from NBC Studios) and happened to overhear that the sketch was being done that night. In the television special Saturday Night Live: 101 Most Unforgettable Moments, this particular sketch is moment number six.

=== Call-ins ===
Richman would occasionally take callers. The number to call was always 555-4444, each "four" again said with the same accent (though, in some later airings, the 555 is bleeped out and covered up on screen, as 555-4444 is no longer a fictitious telephone number). "Give a call, we'll talk, no big whoop."

=== Mannerisms ===
Richman occasionally added Yiddish or pseudo-Yiddish words into her speech: "OK now, this show used to be hosted by my friend Paul Baldwin, but he developed shpilkis in his genechtagazoink. So now he's in Boca Raton, Florida, recovering nicely, thank you very much." The catchphrase often used to describe things Linda admired was "like butter", which in the accent becomes "like buttah". A typical example is, "Her voice, it's like buttah."

==== Discussion topics ====
Whenever Richman would get emotional, she would place a hand on her chest and declare that she was becoming "verklempt" (which is based on the Yiddish word "farklemt"). She would proceed to instruct the audience to "talk amongst yourselves," often with a waving hand gesture; she proceeded to give the audience a topic for discussion, typically in the structure of a bahuvrihi ([two- or three-part phrase] is neither [first part], nor [second part] (nor [third part]). Richman would then recover after a beat. Examples:

- "The Progressive Era was neither progressive nor an era. Discuss."
- "The Romanesque church design was based on the Roman basilica. Discuss."
- "The Holy Roman Empire was neither holy nor Roman nor an empire. Discuss." (This quote is based on a famous comment by Voltaire.)
- "Did Truman drop the atomic bomb to defeat the Japanese or to scare the Russians? Discuss."
- "The radical reconstruction of the South after the Civil War was neither radical nor a reconstruction. Discuss."
- "Franklin Delano Roosevelt's New Deal was neither new nor was it a deal. Discuss."
- "Transitional Romanesque architecture was neither transitional nor Romanesque. Discuss."
- "The internal combustion engine was neither internal nor a combustion. Discuss."
- "The Industrial Revolution was neither Industrial nor a Revolution. Discuss."
- "The peanut is neither a pea nor a nut. Discuss."
- "The Italian neo realist movement in film was neither Italian nor neo nor particularly real. Discuss."
- "The Partridge Family were neither partridges, nor a family. Discuss."
- "The ThighMaster is neither a thigh nor a master. Discuss."
- "The chickpea is neither a chick nor a pea. Discuss."
- "Duran Duran is neither a Duran nor a Duran. Discuss."
- "The Mormon Tabernacle Choir is neither Mormon nor a tabernacle nor a choir. Discuss."
- "Ralph Fiennes's name is neither spelled rafe nor fines. Discuss."
- "Rhode Island is neither a road nor is it an island. Discuss."
- "Dr. Pepper were neither a doctor, nor a pepper. Discuss."
- "Milli Vanilli is neither a Milli or a Vanilli. Discuss."
- "Palmolive – it's neither palm, nor olive. Discuss."
- "Grape-Nuts – it contains neither grapes, nor nuts. Discuss."
- "The Civil War was neither civil nor a war. Discuss."
- "Jamaican Joe was neither Jamaican, nor named Joe. Discuss."
- "The jelly bean is neither made of jelly nor is it a bean. Discuss."

==== Ethnic and religious references ====
Richman would also make light jokes and good-natured ribbing about people raised in interfaith families, such as: someone who came from a family with Methodist and Jewish parents is called a "Mu Shu", whereas people who came from families with Jewish and Roman Catholic parents were called "cashews". In one of the final episodes of the sketch, Richman is shown with an Irish-Catholic boyfriend, who is a retired NYPD officer (played by Charlton Heston). When the boyfriend proposes marriage to her, Richman acts stunned, which prompts tremendous cheering from the female audience members.

== Episodes ==
1. Jan 19, 1991 (Sting): as Paul Baldwin
2. May 11, 1991 (Delta Burke): final appearance of Paul Baldwin
3. October 12, 1991 (Kirstie Alley): first appearance of Linda Richman
4. February 22, 1992 (Madonna and Roseanne Barr): surprise cameo by Barbra Streisand
5. December 12, 1992 (Glenn Close)
6. January 8, 1993 (Jason Patric)
7. February 20, 1993 (Bill Murray)
8. March 13, 1993 (John Goodman)
9. May 8, 1993 (Christina Applegate)
10. September 25, 1993 (Charles Barkley)
11. October 30, 1993 (Christian Slater)
12. December 4, 1993 (Charlton Heston)
13. March 19, 1994 (Helen Hunt)
14. May 14, 1994 (Heather Locklear)
15. October 15, 1994 (John Travolta)
16. March 22, 1997 (Mike Myers)
17. February 16, 2025 (SNL50: The Anniversary Special)

== Cultural references ==
The Fran Drescher sitcom The Nanny (1993–1999) made a direct tongue-in-cheek reference to the Richman sketches by showing brunette Fran Fine (Drescher), her blonde mother (Renée Taylor) and gray-haired grandma Yetta (Ann Guilbert) on the couch watching their respective "Coffee Talk" counterparts (Myers', Madonna's, and Roseanne Barr's characters) on television, all very similar in their appearance, voice and mannerisms. While fussing over their big hair in the fashion of the "Coffee Talk" regulars, they complain that the sketch is "so stereotypical".

The Richman character was inspired by Myers' then real-life mother-in-law, a woman of New York Jewish heritage who is actually named Linda Richman. During a Larry King interview of Myers, the real Richman called in and expressed good-natured amusement about the character. During his appearance on Inside the Actors Studio, he claimed that his impression for the character was "underplayed" and that his mother-in-law actually goaded him into performing the voice of the character when they were in public together.

Myers made an appearance as Richman during Streisand's '93/'94 New Year's Eve concert at the MGM Grand Las Vegas. While Streisand discussed reporting made in The New York Times, Richman was heard from the audience assuring Streisand to ignore such press ("Don't listen to that woman, Barbra; what does she know? Please! Feh!"). Streisand then invited Richman up on stage, and they performed a comedy skit lampooning the Coffee Talk discussion topics. (Streisand: "Now, I'm getting ferklempt! [To audience:] Talk amongst yourselves. I'll give you a topic: The Prince of Tides was about neither a prince nor tides – Discuss.")

== See also ==
- Recurring Saturday Night Live characters and sketches introduced 1990-91
