= Sprockets (Saturday Night Live) =

Comedy sketch by Mike Myers

Title card from Saturday Night Live's Sprockets, with the title superimposed over the flash of a nuclear explosion

Mike Myers as Dieter

Sprockets was a recurring comedy sketch from the NBC television series Saturday Night Live, created by and starring comedian Mike Myers as the host of a fictional West German television talk show. The sketch parodied German art culture in the 1980s.

== Development ==
The sketch parodied German stereotypes, especially those pertaining to German seriousness, efficiency, and precision. Myers originally created the Sprockets concept for the Toronto company of the Second City comedy troupe. He later imported it to television for the Canadian sketch comedy show It's Only Rock & Roll and the American sketch comedy show Saturday Night Live.

Myers played "Dieter", a bored, disaffected West German expressionist and minimalist who interviewed celebrities in whom he was demonstrably barely interested. He invariably sought to bring the discussion around to his "limited" monkey, Klaus, seated on a platform atop a miniature column. Myers has stated he based the character on a waiter he encountered, working at The Cameron House in Toronto, as well as German musician Klaus Nomi (after whom said monkey was named). Appearing effeminate (in his 1997 return as host Myers introduced his lover Helmut, played by Will Ferrell), Myers' "Dieter" costume consisted of black tights with a matching turtleneck sweater, round wire-rimmed glasses, and slicked-back hair.

On several occasions, the sketch featured a section titled Germany's Most Disturbing Home Videos, spoofing the contemporary America's Funniest Home Videos series. In contrast to the cute or slapstick amateur videos shown on the American program, the German videos segment showcased such bizarre scenes as an old man's head spinning around; a fat man, clad only in a diaper, cavorting in a lawn sprinkler; a man vomiting after being kicked in the genitals; the seemingly-lifeless body of a tramp whose face is covered with ants; and a man's trousers falling down in public, while he and his girlfriend are viewing an art gallery (the man is wearing a thong). The sketch typically ended with Myers declaring, "Now's the time on Sprockets when we dance!" and performing a jerky, robotic dance with several male stagehands who were similarly dressed in black tights and turtlenecks.

The theme song for the sketch was Kraftwerk's 1986 song "Electric Café" from a 33 RPM LP record which was sped up by playing it back at 45 RPM.

Some later sketches featured Dieter outside of his talk show environment starring in parodies of game shows, TV dance parties, and art films.

== Quotations from Dieter ==
- "Your presence intimidates me to the point of humiliation. Would you care to strike me?"
- "That film/poem looks at me while I'm naked, and calls its friends."
- "I feel emotionally obliterated."
- "That poem/film pulls down my pants and makes fun of me. But not in a malicious way."
- "You have disturbed me almost to the point of insanity...There. I am insane now."
- "I am filled with anticipation/remorse, and it is most delicious."
- "Touch my monkey."
- "I'm as happy as a little girl."
- ''Exquisite.''
- ''Gorgeous.''

== List of SNL episodes featuring Dieter ==
Karl-Heinz Shalke (Kyle MacLachlan) obliges Dieter's request to "touch my monkey".

All appearances were in the form of Sprockets shows.

- April 15, 1989 host: Dolly Parton (featuring Ben Stiller as Butch Patrick)
- May 20, 1989 host: Steve Martin
- September 30, 1989 host: Bruce Willis (featuring Dana Carvey as James Stewart)
- November 18, 1989 host: Woody Harrelson (featuring Harrelson as filmmaker Gregor Voss...whose work includes The Dead Coat, Irritant #4, and Here, Child, Finish Your Nothing)
- December 16, 1989 (in "Dieter In Space") host: Andie MacDowell
- March 17, 1990 (in "Dieter's Dance Party", a parody of American Bandstand) host: Rob Lowe
- September 29, 1990 (in "Germany's Most Disturbing Home Videos") (featuring Kyle MacLachlan as Karl-Heinz Shalke, the wacky neighbor in Munich TV's hit sit-com Who Are You to Accuse Me?)
- December 15, 1990 host: Dennis Quaid
- April 13, 1991 host: Catherine O'Hara
- February 15, 1992 (in "Love Werks") host: Jason Priestley
- May 16, 1992 host: Woody Harrelson (featuring Harrelson as filmmaker Graus Grek, giving his plans for his new "EuroTrash" theme park)
- March 20, 1993 (in "Dieter's Dream") host: Miranda Richardson
- November 20, 1993 (in "Das Ist Jeopardy!") host: Nicole Kidman
- March 22, 1997 (in "The Insane Academy Awards") host: Mike Myers

== Cancelled film adaptation ==
The sketch was to be used as the basis for a feature-length film titled Dieter's Day, which was to be directed by production designer Bo Welch (of both Beetlejuice and Edward Scissorhands fame) in his directorial debut and to star Myers (who was expected to receive $20 million for the film) alongside Will Ferrell, David Hasselhoff and Jack Black and was slated for a summer 2001 release and filming expected to begin in August 2000, but the project was cancelled in June 2000 after Myers became dissatisfied with his own script. Less than a week after Myers informed Universal Pictures of his decision, the studio sued Myers for their $3.8 million spent in pre-production costs. One month later, Myers was hit with a second lawsuit, this time from Imagine Entertainment, which claimed that "He [Myers] claimed he had not approved the screenplay. Who wrote the screenplay--Myers," Imagine claims Myers backed out after it and Universal agreed to his demands for more pay and millions of dollars were spent in pre-production. "This was not the first time Myers engaged in such conduct," the suit contended. "He has followed a pattern and practice of breaking his promises, betraying the trust of others and causing serious damage to those with whom he deals through selfish, egomaniacal and irresponsible conduct." The Imagine lawsuit sought more than $30 million in actual damages plus punitive damages. Myers subsequently countersued both parties and both lawsuits were later settled out of court, whereupon Myers and Welch agreed to make another film with both Universal and Imagine as replacement for the Dieter film; that film became The Cat in the Hat, which was directed by Welch, starred Myers as the titular character, and was released three years later in 2003.

== See also ==
- Recurring Saturday Night Live characters and sketches
