= Gasping for Airtime =

2004 memoir

- Author: Jay Mohr
- Genre: Memoir
- Publication date: 2004

Gasping for Airtime: Two Years in the Trenches of Saturday Night Live is a 2004 memoir by former Saturday Night Live featured player Jay Mohr. In it, Mohr recounts, among other things, his experiences with panic attacks, arguments with castmates Rob Schneider and Ellen Cleghorne, his working relationship with Al Franken, his admiration for deceased castmates Chris Farley and Phil Hartman, the admission that he stole material from actor/comedian Rick Shapiro, and being bitter about his lack of sketch appearances.

Former SNL castmember Bobby Moynihan has said that it was one of his favorite SNL related books, calling it "a handbook on what NOT to do at SNL."

== Critical reception ==
Booklist called it "Good insider dish": "Mohr chronicles those years with the sly wit he's become known for, as well as nostalgia for both the time he had and the kid he was. That's not to say things went well. He barely got any sketches on air, his dressing room was once an elevator shaft, and he suffered panic attacks so severe he thought he would die on camera. But he also met some encouraging people (Michael McKean) and was able to spend a little time hanging out with various luminaries (Eric Clapton), so even though he moans and whines about what he endured on the show, he ends up describing the experience as glorious."

Publishers Weekly, on the other hand, found "this stilted but honest memoir" to serve only "mostly superficial dish": "Few of his sketches aired, and aside from his impressions of Ricki Lake, Christopher Walken and Dick Vitale, he was rarely on camera. (When he was on air, he admits, he often couldn't keep a straight face.) Mohr treats readers to some affectionate, entertaining tales of the late Chris Farley, but his book is less a juicy inside story of the comedy institution than a tale of an immature young man's struggle with a high-stress, erratic workplace: 'The schedule for putting together Saturday Night Live was made back in the seventies when everyone was on coke.... Problem was, no one did coke [anymore] and we were expected to keep the same hours.'"

Kirkus Reviews wrote, "Mohr is unafraid to come off as nervous and a little grating: the whole first season he's just the new guy nobody will look in the eye, whose ideas get shot down, who's always asking dumb questions and almost never gets on the air. Though tinged with bitterness (after two seasons, Mohr was basically known only for his Christopher Walken impersonation), this account is generous in its praise for people like Phil Hartman, Chris Farley, and Michael McKean. Profiles of other costars--like David Spade, who 'was only on the show so he could sleep with models'—are just dishy enough to leave the reader wanting more. Despite stiff prose, an engagingly honest look at the crossroads of comedy and dysfunction."

Kliatt gave the audiobook, read by Mohr, an A: "Mohr's experiences make one wonder how the show ever gets on the air. He dishes unflattering portraits of some of the cast and some guest hosts while speaking most fondly of Phil Hartman and Chris Farley. He does not shy from revealing his warts as well. For fans of SNL. Raw language... Recommended for advanced students and adults."
