= Saturday Night Live season 20 =

Saturday Night Live
- Season 20
- No. of episodes: 20

Release
- Original network: NBC
- Original release: September 24, 1994 – May 13, 1995

Season chronology
- ← Previous season 19 Next → season 21

The twentieth season of Saturday Night Live (also branded Saturday Night Live 20), an American sketch comedy series, originally aired in the United States on NBC between September 24, 1994, and May 13, 1995.

Much like the 1980–1981 season and the 1985–1986 season, NBC worried over SNL's decline in both quality and ratings and initially decided to cancel the show. According to the documentary Saturday Night Live in the '90s: Pop Culture Nation, Lorne Michaels names this season as the closest he has ever been to being fired. The cast member firings and crew turnover after this season represented the biggest involvement in the show's affairs by NBC executives since the 1980–1981 season and the biggest cast overhaul since the 1985–1986 season.

This season saw the deaths of two SNL alumni: season 11 cast member Danitra Vance (who died of breast cancer) and "Not Ready for Primetime"-era writer and occasional performer Michael O'Donoghue (who died of a brain hemorrhage after years of suffering from migraine headaches). The Sarah Jessica Parker-hosted episode featured a special appearance by Bill Murray, who introduced a clip from season 3, "The Soiled Kimono", aired in O'Donoghue's memory.

== Cast ==
Preceding the season 20 premiere, longtime cast members Phil Hartman, Melanie Hutsell, Rob Schneider, and Julia Sweeney all left the show, alongside featured player Sarah Silverman. In their places, the show hired Late Night with David Letterman writer Chris Elliott, as well as stand-up comedians Janeane Garofalo and Laura Kightlinger, to the cast. Elliott and Garofalo were made repertory players, while Kightlinger was made a featured player.

Jay Mohr remained a featured player and Norm Macdonald was promoted to repertory status and made Weekend Update anchor. Though Kevin Nealon was no longer a Weekend Update anchor, he still remained on the show to the end of the season, after a then-record nine years in the cast.

As the season progressed, Morwenna Banks, Mark McKinney and Molly Shannon were added to the cast. McKinney was hired from the then-recently ended sketch show The Kids in the Hall, which was produced by Michaels.

According to New York magazine, former cast member Dana Carvey (who was previously a cast member from 1986 to 1993) almost returned to the cast this season, but that ended up not happening. He would, however, host an episode of the show during this season.

Several cast members quit during the season. Longtime cast member Mike Myers left after the January 21, 1995 episode (exactly six years after his first episode on January 21, 1989) largely due to his increasing fame as a film star. Garofalo quit the show following the February 25 episode, citing her unhappiness with the work environment and writing material. She would later call Saturday Night Live "... an unfair boys' club" and called many of the sketches "juvenile and homophobic." Longtime staff writer and cast member Al Franken's final appearance as a featured player was on May 6 following the box office failure of the SNL spin-off film Stuart Saves His Family.

Following the May 13, 1995 season finale, nine other cast members either quit or were fired: Morwenna Banks, Ellen Cleghorne, Chris Elliott, Chris Farley, Laura Kightlinger, Michael McKean, Jay Mohr, Kevin Nealon, and Adam Sandler. Nealon, Cleghorne, McKean, Elliott, and Kightlinger left the show at season's end on their own terms; Farley, Sandler, Banks, and Mohr were dismissed after the finale.

In his book Gasping for Airtime, Mohr wrote that following the season, he demanded a promotion to repertory status, among other things; the network procrastinated throughout the summer of 1995 and he chose to quit. Mohr's account of his voluntary departure has been widely discounted, as he was under a cloud of suspicion due to his admitted plagiarism of jokes during the season and his multi-year contract with NBC did not allow him to unilaterally quit.

This was also the final season for director Dave Wilson and bandleader G. E. Smith, who had been with the program since its first and eleventh seasons, respectively.

=== Cast roster ===
**Repertory players**

- Morwenna Banks (first episode: April 8, 1995)
- Ellen Cleghorne
- Chris Elliott
- Chris Farley
- Janeane Garofalo (final episode: February 25, 1995)
- Norm Macdonald
- Michael McKean
- Mark McKinney (first episode: January 14, 1995)
- Tim Meadows
- Mike Myers (final episode: January 21, 1995)
- Kevin Nealon
- Adam Sandler
- David Spade

**Featured players**

- Al Franken (final episode: May 6, 1995)
- Laura Kightlinger
- Jay Mohr
- Molly Shannon (first episode: February 25, 1995)

bold denotes Weekend Update anchor

Laura Kightlinger and Jay Mohr were credited in the opening montage for all 20 episodes this season, while Molly Shannon was credited for all of the back seven episodes after she joined the cast. Al Franken was only credited for four episodes sporadically throughout the season.

== Writers ==
Notable writers during the 20th season of Saturday Night Live included Jim Downey, Al Franken, and Tim Herlihy.

Brian Kelley and Norm Hiscock were hired as writers.

Beginning with the episode hosted by John Travolta, stand-up comedian Drake Sather joined the writing staff.

This would be Franken's final season as a writer (after having been one of the original writers from its inception in 1975 to 1980; and had been writing for the show again since 1985), as he permanently left the show after 15 accumulative years.

It was also the final season for fellow longtime/original writers Herb Sargent (who had written for the show from 1975 to 1980; and had been writing for it again since 1984) and Marilyn Suzanne Miller (who initially wrote for the show from 1975 to 1978 and wrote for the 1981–82 season, and returned in 1993 midway through season 18). Sargent presumably retired after 16 accumulative years with the show, while Miller left after seven accumulative seasons.

This was Downey's last season as head writer (a role he had been in since 1985) as he was forced out of the role, after 10 years. He did return to the show the next season, but as a producer for Weekend Update.

This was also the final season for David Mandel, Ian Maxtone-Graham (who both joined as writers in 1992, and departed after three years), and Lewis Morton (who joined the writing staff back in 1993), departing after two years.

The only writers to return to the show the next season were Downey, Herlihy, Hiscock, Steve Koren, and Fred Wolf (who would be named as the show's head writer next season in place of Downey).

== Episodes ==
No. overall	No. in season	Host	Musical guest(s)	Original release date
367	1	Steve Martin	Eric Clapton	September 24, 1994
Credited Featured Players: Laura Kightlinger, Jay Mohr; Eric Clapton performs "I'm Tore Down" and "Five Long Years". At the end of the show, Clapton sits in with the SNL Band to play the closing theme.; Bobby Bonilla, Roger Clemens, Lenny Dykstra, Jack McDowell and Mo Vaughn appeared in the "Super Sports Tours" sketch.; Brian Austin Green appeared in the "O.J. Simpson Trial" sketch.; Norm Macdonald's first episode as Weekend Update anchor.; Martin Short was originally to host but dropped out.; Chris Elliott, Janeane Garofalo and Laura Kightlinger's first episode as cast members.
368	2	Marisa Tomei	Bonnie Raitt	October 1, 1994
Credited Featured Players: Al Franken, Laura Kightlinger, Jay Mohr; Bonnie Raitt performs "Love Sneakin' Up On You" and "Storm Warning".
369	3	John Travolta	Seal	October 15, 1994
Credited Featured Players: Laura Kightlinger, Jay Mohr; Seal performs "Prayer for the Dying" and "Crazy".; David Lander and Steve Buscemi appeared in the "Quentin Tarantino's Welcome Back, Kotter" sketch.; Travolta, Seal, Lander, Buscemi, & the cast performed "We Go Together" from Grease during the Goodnights.
370	4	Dana Carvey	Edie Brickell	October 22, 1994
Credited Featured Players: Al Franken, Laura Kightlinger, Jay Mohr; Edie Brickell performed "Green" and "Tomorrow Comes". Paul Simon joined Brickell for her first performance.; George H. W. Bush made a filmed appearance in the cold opening and monologue.; Contains an "Office Space" cartoon by Mike Judge
371	5	Sarah Jessica Parker	R.E.M.	November 12, 1994
Credited Featured Players: Laura Kightlinger, Jay Mohr; R.E.M. performs "What's the Frequency, Kenneth?", "Bang and Blame", and "I Don't Sleep, I Dream".; Bill Murray appears near the end of the episode to announce the death of former SNL writer, Michael O'Donoghue, and to replay one of his famous sketches, "The Soiled Kimono", which aired in SNL's third season.; Juliette Lewis was originally scheduled to host but dropped out due to unknown issues.
372	6	John Turturro	Tom Petty	November 19, 1994
Credited Featured Players: Laura Kightlinger, Jay Mohr; Tom Petty & the Heartbreakers perform "You Don't Know How It Feels" and "Honey Bee". Dave Grohl played with the Heartbreakers, who were in between drummers at the time.; Joey Buttafuoco appeared during the monologue.; David Hasselhoff appeared during "Weekend Update".
373	7	Roseanne	Green Day	December 3, 1994
Credited Featured Players: Laura Kightlinger, Jay Mohr; Green Day performs "When I Come Around" and "Geek Stink Breath".; Rip Taylor appears in the "Lock-Up" sketch.; Adam Sandler debuts "The Chanukah Song" on Weekend Update.
374	8	Alec Baldwin	Beastie Boys	December 10, 1994
Credited Featured Players: Laura Kightlinger, Jay Mohr; Beastie Boys perform "Sure Shot" and a medley of "Ricky's Theme" and "Heart Attack Man".; Christian Slater appears during the "Celebrity Memorabilia Auction" sketch.
375	9	George Foreman	Hole	December 17, 1994
Credited Featured Players: Laura Kightlinger, Jay Mohr; Hole performs "Doll Parts" and "Violet".; Bruce McCulloch appeared in the "Stalking" short film.; Michael Buffer appeared in the "Time Boxer" sketch.
376	10	Jeff Daniels	Luscious Jackson	January 14, 1995
Credited Featured Players: Laura Kightlinger, Jay Mohr; Luscious Jackson performs "Citysong" and "Here".; Mark McKinney's first episode as a cast member.
377	11	David Hyde Pierce	Live	January 21, 1995
Credited Featured Players: Laura Kightlinger, Jay Mohr; Live performs "I Alone" and "Selling the Drama".; Mike Myers' final episode as a cast member.
378	12	Bob Newhart	Des'ree	February 11, 1995
Credited Featured Players: Laura Kightlinger, Jay Mohr; Des'ree performs "You Gotta Be" and "Feels So High".; At the end of the episode, Bob Newhart wakes up next to Suzanne Pleshette (as he did on the last episode of Newhart) and tells her about his nightmare hosting SNL.
379	13	Deion Sanders	Bon Jovi	February 18, 1995
Credited Featured Players: Laura Kightlinger, Jay Mohr; Bon Jovi performs "Always" and "Someday I'll Be Saturday Night". Jon Bon Jovi also appeared in the "1995 ESPY Awards" sketch.; Manute Bol appeared in the "1995 ESPY Awards" sketch.; Deion Sanders performs a medley of "Must Be the Money" & "It's On".
380	14	George Clooney	The Cranberries	February 25, 1995
Credited Featured Players: Laura Kightlinger, Jay Mohr, Molly Shannon; The Cranberries perform "Zombie" and "Ode to My Family".; Molly Shannon's first episode as a cast member.; Janeane Garofalo's final episode as a cast member.
381	15	Paul Reiser	Annie Lennox	March 18, 1995
Credited Featured Players: Al Franken, Laura Kightlinger, Jay Mohr, Molly Shannon; Annie Lennox performs "No More I Love You's" and "Train in Vain".; In reruns, the "O'Callahan and Sons" sketch is replaced with the short film Vacation because Jay Mohr admitted plagiarizing "O'Callahan and Sons" from comedian Rick Shapiro.; Bill Grundfest appeared in the opening monologue.
382	16	John Goodman	The Tragically Hip	March 25, 1995
Credited Featured Players: Laura Kightlinger, Jay Mohr, Molly Shannon; The Tragically Hip performs "Grace, Too" and "Nautical Disaster".; Dan Aykroyd appears in the cold open, the opening monologue (as Elwood Blues), the "Bob Swerski's Super Fans" sketch, the "Late Late Show" sketch, the "Rush Limbaugh and Howard Stern" sketch, the "Unsolved Mysteries" sketch, the "Coal Miners" sketch, and introduced both of the Tragically Hip's performances. It is believed the reason for Aykroyd's heavy involvement, despite not being officially credited as host, was because Goodman had run into scheduling conflicts with his role on Roseanne, to the point the cast and crew were unsure if he would be forced to back out as a result; further adding credence to this, his bumper pictures were the ones from his previous hosting gig the prior season, simply reskinned to match the current season's design.; Brian Dennehy, Robert Smigel, and George Wendt appear in the "Bob Swerski's Super Fans" sketch.
383	17	Damon Wayans	Dionne Farris	April 8, 1995
Credited Featured Players: Laura Kightlinger, Jay Mohr, Molly Shannon; Former cast member Wayans returns to the host the show that Lorne Michaels had fired him from nine years ago.; Dionne Farris performs "I Know" and "Blackbird".; David Alan Grier appears during the "Men on Film" sketch, reprising his role as Antoine Merriweather from In Living Color.; Damon Wayans reprises his roles as Anton Jackson and Blaine Edwards from In Living Color.; Janeane Garofalo appears in the pre-recorded "Bathroom Monkey" sketch, first aired during the John Travolta-hosted episode while Garofalo was still in the cast.; Morwenna Banks' first episode as a cast member.
384	18	Courteney Cox	Dave Matthews Band	April 15, 1995
Credited Featured Players: Laura Kightlinger, Jay Mohr, Molly Shannon; Dave Matthews Band performs "What Would You Say" and "Ants Marching". Bela Fleck sat in with the SNL band.
385	19	Bob Saget	TLC	May 6, 1995
Credited Featured Players: Al Franken, Laura Kightlinger, Jay Mohr, Molly Shannon; TLC performs "Creep" and "Red Light Special".; Al Franken's final episode as a cast member.; During Weekend Update, a clip of Howard Cosell in an Ed Grimley sketch is shown from when he hosted in 1985 as a commemoration to Cosell's death that occurred three weeks before the episode aired.
386	20	David Duchovny	Rod Stewart	May 13, 1995
Credited Featured Players: Laura Kightlinger, Jay Mohr, Molly Shannon; Rod Stewart performs "Leave Virginia Alone" and "Maggie May".; Michael Angarano appears during the opening monologue.; Naomi Campbell appears during the "You Think You're Better Than Me?" sketch.; Final show of G. E. Smith with the Saturday Night Live Band and as co-musical director.; Dave Wilson's final episode as director.; Kevin Nealon, Chris Farley, Adam Sandler, Ellen Cleghorne, Jay Mohr, Michael McKean, Chris Elliott, Laura Kightlinger and Morwenna Banks's final episode as cast members.

== Critical reception ==
Negative critical reception of the show began building in season 18, after the departure of veteran cast member Dana Carvey. The criticism intensified after Phil Hartman left. Without Hartman and Carvey, critics expressed that SNL lacked an anchor to hold its sketches together, leaving Chris Farley, Adam Sandler, and David Spade to carry much of the show. Critics also expressed the show was missing its signature political humor, and pointed out that veteran writers like Jack Handey, Robert Smigel, and Conan O'Brien had already left the staff. By season 19, the show's lackluster reputation had become a joke that was referenced by guest hosts during their opening monologue. Sandler himself criticized the show's writing when he told TV Guide "The writing sucks this season." Sandler later said he was misquoted.

Critics expressed distaste for the sophomoric, juvenile humor that characterized the "Bad Boy" era of SNL. In the New York Daily News, Eric Mink opined that SNL appeared to be exclusively catering to younger, male audiences with its humor. Janeane Garofalo quit midseason, citing "juvenile and homophobic" sketches and a sexist environment. Critics also pointed to the large cast size as a problem, as African-American members like Tim Meadows and Ellen Cleghorne went underused. Another criticism was that the show had become much more interested in launching cast members into movie stardom than in the show's quality of writing and comedy. Hartman attributed the drop in quality to the show's decision to hire mostly stand-up comics, saying, "[Stand-up comics are] competitive, and they don't generally work as well in an ensemble of actors who come out of an improvisational background."

The critical drubbing culminated in a 1995 New York magazine cover story that detailed the dysfunction among cast and crew.

Norm Macdonald's first year as Weekend Update anchor was seen as a positive change in an otherwise disappointing year.

== Stuart Saves His Family film ==
Stuart Saves His Family, a film based on the popular Stuart Smalley sketches, was released on April 12, 1995. Cast members Robin Duke, Al Franken and Julia Sweeney appear in the film. The film received modest reviews from critics but was a box office bomb. During the season, Franken performed a Stuart Smalley sketch that parodied the film's poor box office returns. Stuart was depressed and bitter throughout the entire segment, eating cookies and lambasting the audience for choosing other movies (such as Dumb and Dumber and anything Pauly Shore had out at the time) over his.
