= Saturday Night Live season 17 =

Saturday Night Live
- Season 17
- No. of episodes: 20

Release
- Original network: NBC
- Original release: September 28, 1991 – May 16, 1992

Season chronology
- ← Previous season 16 Next → season 18

The seventeenth season of Saturday Night Live, an American sketch comedy series, originally aired in the United States on NBC between September 28, 1991, and May 16, 1992.

== Cast ==
A. Whitney Brown, Jan Hooks and longtime Weekend Update anchor Dennis Miller all left the show. Kevin Nealon was promoted to Weekend Update anchor. New cast members included Ellen Cleghorne, Siobhan Fallon and writer Robert Smigel. Beth Cahill and Melanie Hutsell also later joined the cast. Chris Farley, Chris Rock and Julia Sweeney were upgraded to repertory status, while Tim Meadows remained in the middle group. Adam Sandler, Rob Schneider and David Spade were promoted to the middle group.

This was the final season for Victoria Jackson (at the time, she became the longest serving female cast member, with a total of six seasons on the show. She was later surpassed by Molly Shannon in season 26). This would be Cahill and Fallon's only season on the show.

=== Cast roster ===
**Repertory players**

- Dana Carvey
- Chris Farley
- Phil Hartman
- Victoria Jackson
- Mike Myers
- **Kevin Nealon**
- Chris Rock
- Julia Sweeney

**Middle players**

- Ellen Cleghorne
- Siobhan Fallon
- Tim Meadows
- Adam Sandler
- Rob Schneider
- David Spade

**Featured players**

- Beth Cahill (first episode: November 16, 1991)
- Al Franken
- Melanie Hutsell (first episode: November 16, 1991)
- Robert Smigel

bold denotes Weekend Update anchor

All middle players received credit in the opening montage for every episode throughout the season, while featured players only were credited for specific episodes in which they appeared. Hutsell was credited for 14 episodes, Cahill was credited for 13 episodes, Franken was credited for eight episodes and Smigel was credited for four episodes.

== Writers ==
Steve Koren joins the writing staff with the Tom/Roseanne Arnold hosted episode. Koren would be one of the few writers to survive the writer/cast overhaul in 1995.

== Episodes ==
| No. overall | No. in season | Host(s) | Musical guest(s) | Original release date |
|---|---|---|---|---|
| 307 | 1 | Michael Jordan | Public Enemy | September 28, 1991 |
Credited Featured Players: Al Franken, Robert Smigel; Public Enemy performs "Can't Truss It" and "Bring the Noise".; George Wendt appears during the "Bill Swerski's Super Fans" sketch.; Spike Lee appears during the "Dark Side with Nat X" sketch.; Jesse Jackson appears during Weekend Update and reads Green Eggs and Ham as a tribute to Dr. Seuss, who had died four days prior to the episode's initial airing.; Kevin Nealon's first episode as Weekend Update anchor.; Ellen Cleghorne, Siobhan Fallon and Robert Smigel's first episode as cast members.
| 308 | 2 | Jeff Daniels | Color Me Badd | October 5, 1991 |
Credited Featured Player: Al Franken; Color Me Badd performs "I Wanna Sex You Up" and "I Adore Mi Amor".; This episode features the first appearance of "The Chris Farley Show".
| 309 | 3 | Kirstie Alley | Tom Petty & The Heartbreakers | October 12, 1991 |
Credited Featured Player: Al Franken; Tom Petty & The Heartbreakers perform "Into the Great Wide Open" and "Kings Highway".; Kirstie Alley's Cheers co-stars Ted Danson, Kelsey Grammer, Woody Harrelson and George Wendt appear as themselves in the opening monologue.; Siobhan Fallon objected to appear in the Il Cantore sketch and was replaced by Victoria Jackson.
| 310 | 4 | Christian Slater | Bonnie Raitt | October 26, 1991 |
Credited Featured Player: Al Franken; Bonnie Raitt performs "Something to Talk About" and "I Can't Make You Love Me". Raitt dedicated the latter song to concert promoter Bill Graham, who had died in a helicopter crash the day before.; John McLaughlin appears as himself in the cold opening.; Arnold Schwarzenegger makes a guest appearance in the "Hans and Franz" sketch.
| 311 | 5 | Kiefer Sutherland | Skid Row | November 2, 1991 |
Credited Featured Players: (none); Skid Row performs "Piece of Me" and "Monkey Business". Band members Sebastian Bach and Rachel Bolan also appear in the "Kiddie Metal" sketch.; Ken Stabler appears in the "Lung Brush" commercial parody.
| 312 | 6 | Linda Hamilton | Mariah Carey | November 16, 1991 |
Credited Featured Players: Beth Cahill, Melanie Hutsell; Mariah Carey performs "Can't Let Go" and "If It's Over".; Edward Furlong appears as his Terminator 2 character, John Connor, in a "Terminator" parody which doubles as a "Toonces" sketch.; Martin Scorsese appears as himself in "The Chris Farley Show".; Beth Cahill and Melanie Hutsell's first episode as cast members.
| 313 | 7 | Macaulay Culkin | Tin Machine | November 23, 1991 |
Credited Featured Players: Beth Cahill, Al Franken, Robert Smigel; Tin Machine performs "Baby Universal" and "If There Is Something".; Macaulay Culkin's brother (and co-star of Home Alone) Kieran appears in the "Bill Swerski's Super Fans" sketch, as Froggy in a "Richmeister" sketch and in the "Medieval Scalders" sketch.; George Wendt (who played Culkin's father in the music video for Michael Jackson's "Black or White") reprises his role as Bob Swerski in "Bill Swerski's Superfans".
| 314 | 8 | MC Hammer | MC Hammer | December 7, 1991 |
Credited Featured Players: Beth Cahill, Melanie Hutsell; Hammer performs "Too Legit to Quit", "Addams Groove" and "This Is The Way We Roll". Christina Ricci and Jimmy Workman introduce "Addams Groove".
| 315 | 9 | Steve Martin | James Taylor | December 14, 1991 |
Credited Featured Players: Beth Cahill, Melanie Hutsell; James Taylor performs "(I've Got to) Stop Thinkin' 'Bout That", "Shed a Little Light" and "Sweet Baby James".; Contains the "Not Gonna Phone It In Tonight" cold open.; Susan Lucci appears in a filmed cameo during the "Live with Regis and Kathie Lee" sketch.
| 316 | 10 | Rob Morrow | Nirvana | January 11, 1992 |
Credited Featured Players: Beth Cahill, Melanie Hutsell; Nirvana performs "Smells Like Teen Spirit" and "Territorial Pissings". The band trashed their instruments after the second song.; During the good nights, Nirvana bassist Krist Novoselic kisses drummer Dave Grohl. Their kiss was not allowed to be played during reruns and was replaced with the good nights from the dress rehearsal.; During the monologue, Rob Morrow shows a clip from the "Substitute Judge" sketch on the season 5 episode hosted by Rodney Dangerfield, pointing out that he had played one of the jurors.
| 317 | 11 | Chevy Chase | Robbie Robertson | January 18, 1992 |
Credited Featured Players: Beth Cahill, Melanie Hutsell, Robert Smigel; Robbie Robertson performs "Go Back to Your Woods" and "The Weight".; Monk Boudreaux, Bruce Hornsby and Ivan Neville appear in both performances.; George Wendt appears in the "Bob Swerski's Quiz Masters" sketch.
| 318 | 12 | Susan Dey | C&C Music Factory | February 8, 1992 |
Credited Featured Players: Beth Cahill, Melanie Hutsell; C+C Music Factory performs "Here We Go (Let's Rock & Roll)", "Gonna Make You Sweat (Everybody Dance Now)" and "A Deeper Love".
| 319 | 13 | Jason Priestley | Teenage Fanclub | February 15, 1992 |
Credited Featured Players: Beth Cahill, Melanie Hutsell; Teenage Fanclub performs "The Concept", "What You Do to Me" and "Pet Rock".
| 320 | 14 | Roseanne Arnold; Tom Arnold | Red Hot Chili Peppers | February 22, 1992 |
Credited Featured Players: Beth Cahill, Melanie Hutsell, Robert Smigel; Red Hot Chili Peppers perform "Stone Cold Bush" and "Under the Bridge".; Madonna and Barbra Streisand appear in the "Coffee Talk" sketch.
| 321 | 15 | John Goodman | Garth Brooks | March 14, 1992 |
Credited Featured Players: Beth Cahill, Melanie Hutsell, Robert Smigel; Garth Brooks performs "Rodeo" and "The River".
| 322 | 16 | Mary Stuart Masterson | En Vogue | March 21, 1992 |
Credited Featured Players: Beth Cahill, Melanie Hutsell; En Vogue performs "My Lovin' (You're Never Gonna Get It)", "Hold On" and "Free Your Mind".
| 323 | 17 | Sharon Stone | Pearl Jam | April 11, 1992 |
Credited Featured Player: Melanie Hutsell; Pearl Jam performs "Alive" and "Porch," and also appears during the monologue.; Jon Lovitz appears in the "Hitting on Women" sketch.; Beth Cahill is not announced by Don Pardo in the opening credits and does not appear in the episode.
| 324 | 18 | Jerry Seinfeld | Annie Lennox | April 18, 1992 |
Credited Featured Players: Beth Cahill, Al Franken, Melanie Hutsell; Annie Lennox performs "Why" and "Legend in My Living Room".
| 325 | 19 | Tom Hanks | Bruce Springsteen | May 9, 1992 |
Credited Featured Player: Melanie Hutsell; Bruce Springsteen performs "Lucky Town", "57 Channels (And Nothin' On)" and "Living Proof".; Jay Leno appears during Weekend Update.; Joe Pesci was originally planned to host this episode but had to cancel due to the filming of Home Alone 2: Lost in New York running late.
| 326 | 20 | Woody Harrelson | Vanessa Williams | May 16, 1992 |
Credited Featured Players: Beth Cahill, Melanie Hutsell, Robert Smigel; Vanessa Williams performs "Save the Best for Last" and "The Comfort Zone".; Jon Lovitz appears in the "Bad Expectant Mother" sketch.; Cahill, Siobhan Fallon and Victoria Jackson's final episode as cast members.

== Specials ==
| Title | Original release date |
|---|---|
| "Halloween Special" | October 28, 1991 |
Wayne (Mike Myers) & Garth (Dana Carvey) host this compilation of some of SNL's greatest Halloween-themed sketches.
| "All the Best for Mother's Day" | May 10, 1992 |
The cast and their mothers take a look at some of the best sketches from the 16th and 17th seasons. Sketches include "The Tonight Song," "Wayne's World," "The Chris Farley Show," "Massive Headwound Harry," and "Coffee Talk".

== Wayne's World film ==
Wayne's World, a film based on the popular "Wayne's World" sketches, was released on February 14, 1992. Cast members Dana Carvey, Brian Doyle-Murray, Chris Farley and Mike Myers appear in the film. The film received positive reviews and was commercially successful, becoming the highest grossing SNL film to date. A sequel was produced in 1993, titled Wayne's World 2.
