= Bill Swerski's Superfans =

Saturday Night Live sketch making fun of Chicago Bears fans and their accents

"Bill Swerski's Superfans" is a recurring sketch about Chicago sports fans on the American sketch comedy program Saturday Night Live. It was a prominent feature from 1991 to 1992, and its characters have made various other appearances since its inception. The sketch is notable as a media portrayal of the Inland North dialect of American English that predominates in Chicago, most famously through the distinctive pronunciation of the phrase "Da Bears" ([ˈd̪ʌː beɻs]).

== Background ==
Shortly after Robert Smigel moved from New York to Chicago in 1983 to start his career in comedy, he made his first visit to Wrigley Field to see the Cubs play. He noticed a prevalence of large men who wore walrus mustaches and aviator sunglasses, a look similar to Mike Ditka, who had been hired to coach the city's NFL team, the Chicago Bears, the year before. "There was just a swagger among these very virile-looking men", he recalled. "All sports fans kind of have it."

In the following years, that swagger was rewarded as the fortunes of the city's teams improved. The Cubs and the White Sox both made the playoffs for the first time in decades, the National Basketball Association's Bulls drafted Michael Jordan and in 1985 the Bears capped a 15–1 regular season with a victory in Super Bowl XX. Smigel began conceiving of characters based on that sort of fan, and the line "Da Bears!", but could not imagine a setting that would work. He told an improv classmate, Bob Odenkirk, a native of nearby Naperville, about his idea, and Odenkirk reminded him to include the slight hiss with which the word ends when pronounced with a strong enough Chicago accent, something only natives of the area would appreciate.

Smigel and Odenkirk eventually joined the writing staff of Saturday Night Live (SNL) but did not write the sketch until the 1988 writers' strike, when they returned to Chicago to stage the improvisational Happy Happy Good Show, as "Chicago Superfans". At that time, played by Smigel, Odenkirk and Dave Reynolds (with an occasional appearance by Conan O'Brien as one of the fan's sons), they were simply sitting on lawn chairs and drinking beer, but making the wild imaginative leaps by which they could assume the Bears would handily win another Super Bowl. The sketch drew considerable laughter, but when it came time to stage the show in Los Angeles, Smigel cut it, believing audiences there would not understand it. "I'd never thought of it as something that could work on national television," he said, "because it just felt so regional."

In January 1991, Chicago native Joe Mantegna hosted SNL. Odenkirk suggested to Smigel that they pitch the premise to him. Mantegna liked it, and the writers finally came up with a setting, parodying The Sports Writers on TV, a long-running Chicago-area radio show that had been adapted for television by local UHF station WFLD-TV in 1985, featuring three veteran local sportswriters, including Bill Gleason, known for his thick Chicago accent, and Rick Telander, a relative newcomer, sitting around a table and discussing Chicago sports. Odenkirk imagined what the show would be like if its panelists were average fans rather than sportswriters. "The key was that table", said Sports Writers producer John Roach. "Men gathered at a table talking about the shit in an unscripted way that lets you eavesdrop on it." The name "Bill Swerski" was a play on the name of Chuck Swirsky, a Chicago sportscaster.

== Cast ==
- Bill Swerski: Joe Mantegna
- Todd O'Connor: Chris Farley
- Pat Arnold: Mike Myers
- Carl Wollarski: Robert Smigel
- Bob Swerski: George Wendt

== History ==
=== Saturday Night Live (1991–1997) ===
The sketch premiered on January 12, 1991, hours before the Bears were to play the New York Giants in a divisional playoff game at Giants Stadium, a few miles from NBC's Studio 8H in Rockefeller Center. Mantegna starred as Bill Swerski, along with Chris Farley as Todd O'Connor, Mike Myers as Pat Arnold, and Robert Smigel as Carl Wollarski, a part that the writer had intended for Phil Hartman but was assigned by the show's head writer, James Downey, because Downey believed Smigel's accent was more authentic. Smigel said it was easy to play, as the sunglasses allowed him to read the cue cards without anyone noticing, and he could eat during the sketch, which helped him relax. Kevin Nealon also made a brief appearance as oddsmaker Danny Sheridan in the first sketch—he is promptly sent away by Bill after giving the Superfans an honest assessment of the prospect of Mike Ditka single-handedly defeating the Giants.

Subsequent sketches starred George Wendt as Bill's brother Bob, with occasional appearances by Beth Cahill as Bob's daughter Denise. Macaulay Culkin appeared as Tommy Arnold, Pat's young nephew, who played a Pilgrim in a short school program about Thanksgiving, saying that the first Thanksgiving had Indians giving gifts of Polish sausage, in which an Indian (played by Culkin's brother Kieran) predicted the Bears would lead the Detroit Lions 96–14 at the half. John Goodman played Pat Arnold upon Myers's departure from SNL; the change in Pat Arnold's appearance was attributed to "massive weight gain." Mantegna's absence was invariably explained away by Wendt, saying his "brudder Bill" had just "had anudder heart attack." One sketch briefly had Todd's wife wearing a frumpy dress (also played by Chris Farley).

The characters were typically shown in Mike Ditka's sports bar, drinking large amounts of beer, smoking, and gorging themselves on ribs, Polish sausage, and similar foods. All the characters wore dark sunglasses and thick mustaches to resemble Ditka, the Superfans' idol. In addition to discussing Ditka and the Bears, another frequent topic of discussion was the Chicago Bulls and their star player, Michael Jordan, who were winning their first three NBA Championships at the time. Both Ditka and Jordan made appearances (playing themselves) in episodes of the sketch.

Early sketches had posters in the background with the call letters WBBM, the CBS corporate-owned and -operated TV, AM and FM stations in Chicago, though later sketches changed the call letters to WBCM.

The group would discuss upcoming sporting events and inevitably predict a huge victory for the Chicago team, using an exaggerated Chicago accent—a variety of Inland Northern American English—normally culminating in a uniform toast to "Da Bearss" and "Da Bullss", although "Da Cubss" was heard on at least one occasion. However, they seldom talked about ice hockey, or "Da Blackhawks" or made mention of "Da White Sox". Their predictions were likewise exaggerated and their topics of conversation often ludicrous. Typical debates involved Mike Ditka versus a hurricane—in this particular debate, the Superfans believed that Ditka could defeat the hurricane, until it was revealed that the name of the hurricane was Hurricane Ditka, at which point Todd O'Connor had a heart attack out of confusion; who would win in a competition for World Domination—"Da Bearss" or "Da Bullss"; Ditka winning the Indianapolis 500 driving the Bears' team bus; or how many points Jordan could score if he played an entire game by himself while lounging in a recliner.

One episode asked the outcome of the Bulls/Pistons game where Todd said the Bulls would win 402–0—but Jordan would be held to under 200 points. Todd usually predicted shutouts. During the first episode, he predicted that the Bears would defeat the Giants 79–0, claiming that "the Bears' defense is like a wall. You can't go t'rough it." (The Giants won the actual game, 31–3.) Pat once predicted the Bears would win their game by a score of 31 to -7. When asked how a team could end up with negative points, Todd replied, "Ditka'll find a way." One episode featured a Jeopardy!-like game show preempting the Bearless, and therefore unimportant, Super Bowl, starring Bob Swerski as host and the other Superfans as contestants. All the questions dealt with the Bears, Chicago, or Ditka. The Final Jeopardy! question was "Bears vs. Bulls," which produced hilarious responses from the contestants. The correct answer was revealed to be that such a match-up would tear the fabric of the space-time continuum and destroy the planet, meaning the United Nations would have to step in prior to the match to prevent the destruction.

The characters appeared in nine episodes in two years. The January 9, 1993 cold open featured Mantegna's return as Bill Swerski since the character's debut, as well as a pre-taped cameo from Mike Ditka, who had recently been fired as Bears' coach. The sketch only appeared two more times after this episode: March 1995 – following Myers' mid-season departure from the show and during Farley's final months as a cast member – and again when Farley hosted in October 1997. This final sketch (actually a taped segment narrated by Bill Kurtis, ostensibly a TV documentary piece) featured the second appearance by Ditka, though he was at the time coaching the New Orleans Saints, which resulted in a schism among the Superfans (Carl had taken up with the Saints, Bob had moved to Jackson, Tennessee—halfway between Chicago and New Orleans—and Todd believed it was 1986, and had a heart attack if told otherwise). Farley's death two months later seemed to preclude the possibility of any future Superfan sketches on Saturday Night Live.

=== Other appearances ===
- One of Bob, Carl and Todd's first appearances outside of Saturday Night Live came in a skit during the introduction of NBC's introduction for the November 24, 1991, game between the Bears and the Miami Dolphins at Soldier Field.
- Later in 1991, Wendt, Smigel, and Farley appeared in character during the halftime show of the Bears wild card playoff game against the Dallas Cowboys. The show ended with the trio attempting to kick field goals, with Todd falling flat on his face while running up to kick, Carl drilling a field goal after taking a bite of a hot dog and a sip of beer, and Bob turning his try into a fake field goal ending with him scoring a touchdown.
- In 1992, Bob, Carl, and Todd appeared in a skit that aired before Super Bowl XXVI. Sportscaster Pat O'Brien stops by their tailgate to get their thoughts on the game, and the group predicts a victory for the Bears. Confused, O'Brien points out the Washington Redskins are the NFC representative and the Bears had actually lost to both them and the Buffalo Bills in the regular season. The group dismisses all of his claims with Todd in particular becoming more agitated. Eventually, Bob and Carl take O'Brien aside and explain they know the Bears aren't playing and are just pretending because they're afraid Todd will suffer another heart attack if he finds out the truth. O'Brien plays along thereafter, but slips up when signing off and Todd clutches his chest in pain.
- The characters made special appearances at the celebrations of the Bulls' 1992, 1993 and 1996 NBA championships in Grant Park. In 1993 – the Bulls' first three-peat, NBC interrupted daytime television to broadcast the short speeches made by the Superfans, which involved both praising the Bulls and making fun of their vanquished playoff opponents. Bob Swerski and Carl Wollarski also made a special appearance during Jordan's original jersey retirement ceremony at the United Center in 1994. In 1996, they wore feather boas and had painted hair and colorful hats in the style of Dennis Rodman.
- On the October 18, 2003 SNL episode, Bart Swerski (Bob's nephew, played by Horatio Sanz) was introduced on a Weekend Update segment with his uncle, discussing the recent playoff failure of the Chicago Cubs. Instead of referring to the team as "Da Cubs," Bart said "De Cubs," but it was learned that this was due to a speech impediment. The same year, sports journalist Jay Mariotti decried the negative reactions of Chicago Cubs fans to the Steve Bartman incident, which went as far as sending Bartman and his family death threats, remarking that they were making Cubs fans look like "those mopes from the Superfans skits on Saturday Night Live." (The Superfans themselves could be considered part of that group: Bart Swerski claimed during the Update segment that the desire to exact retribution on Bartman had united the people of Chicago as never before, and Uncle Bob said he arrived late because he had been at church, praying for divine assistance in hunting him down.)
- In 2006, George Wendt returned in Superfan garb alongside Ditka for a sketch prior to Super Bowl XL.
- In a 2007 SNL sketch, Donatella Versace said to David and Victoria Beckham, "If you guys were a football team, you would be Da Bores." The episode aired the night before Super Bowl XLI, in which the Indianapolis Colts beat the Bears. Following the Bears' loss, the Superfans Bill Swerski, Bob Swerski, and Carl Wollarski returned in a TV commercial for Reebok, alongside Colts kicker Adam Vinatieri. A variety of Superfan-themed fan sites also sprang up during this time, including DaSuperfans.com, which gained significant media attention in Chicago and beyond.
- In November 2008, ESPN ran a segment featuring Bill Swerski discussing Ditka's real-life possible run for a U.S. Senate seat in 2004, against Barack Obama. (Ditka decided not to run, and Obama won the seat.)
- On September 11, 2011, ESPN ran a segment featuring Bob Swerski discussing Chicago Bears Quarterback Jay Cutler and his image after the 2010 NFC Championship Game.
- The GEICO Gecko performed an impersonation of the Superfans in a March 2012 commercial (complete with "Da Bears"), in which the gecko, who is in Chicago, demonstrates his efforts to make his cockney accent more understandable to the populace.
- In 2012, Old Navy introduced a commercial with the Superfans, including Ditka.
- In 2013, State Farm Insurance introduced a commercial with Superfans Bob Swerski and Carl Wollarski interacting with Green Bay Packers quarterback Aaron Rodgers, though they recognize him only as the "Discount DAAA-ble Check" guy—a reference to a series of commercials Rodgers made for State Farm (the Packers are the Bears' biggest rivals). This has led to a series of short weekly State Farm ads featuring the Superfans during the NFL regular season that features "Double Down Challenge" wagers for fantasy football.
- In a 2019 NBC football promo Bob Swerski and Carl Wollarski are sitting in front of Soldier Field and Bill hands him a Bear doll sold in Green Bay. Carl says it appears to be a cute Bears kicking doll. When given a squeeze it says "Double Doink" referring to the infamous missed Cody Parkey field goal in the 2019 playoffs. A follow-up promo features the two eating with former Packers quarterback Brett Favre and debating the two teams' histories, and it is revealed Favre is behind the kicking dolls. The promos were created for the Bears and Packers September 5 NFL season opener.
- Also in 2019, Bob Swerski and Carl Wollarski made a guest appearance on the ESPN Plus series Peyton's Places. Former NFL quarterback Peyton Manning hangs out with them as part of his trip to Chicago to discuss the league's history in the city. The duo end up baptizing Manning into the Bears superfandom using a vat of beef juice and Manning emerges dressed like them.
- On June 1, 2024, Smigel and Wendt were joined by Jason Sudeikis (Wendt's nephew) taking over the role of Todd O'Connor (with the sketch explaining the character's change in appearance as the result of Todd losing weight from Ozempic) and Kansas City Chiefs players Patrick Mahomes and Travis Kelce in a Superfans skit at a charity event in Kansas City.

== Impact ==
In 2025, the "Da Bears" phrase experienced a brief resurgence in popularity following the election of Chicago-born Catholic prelate Robert Francis Prevost as Pope Leo XIV. Drawing on Prevost's Chicago roots, social media users began sharing the graphic "Da Pope" in the style of the jerseys worn by the panelists.

== See also ==
- Recurring Saturday Night Live characters and sketches
