= Beth Cahill =

American actress

- Born: Chicago, Illinois, U.S.
- Other name: Betty Cahill
- Occupations: Actress, comedian

Beth Cahill is an American actress and comedian. She is best known for her brief stint as a featured cast member on the NBC sketch comedy series Saturday Night Live during its 17th season between 1991 and 1992.

== Life and career ==
She began her career doing improv comedy at the Annoyance Theater in Chicago and starred as Marcia Brady in their production of The Real Live Brady Bunch in 1990. Cahill along with castmate Melanie Hutsell (who played Jan Brady in the show) were both hired as cast members on Saturday Night Live (SNL) after producers were impressed by their performances in the Brady Bunch stage show. They both reprised their roles as Jan and Marcia Brady on SNL as well.

During her time on the SNL, Cahill impersonated Pam Hurn and played recurring characters such as Denise Swerski, the daughter of Bob Swerski in the Bill Swerski's Superfans sketches and Pam, one of the "Delta Delta Delta" sorority girls, which Cahill performed alongside Melanie Hutsell and Siobhan Fallon.

Cahill now splits her time between Los Angeles and Chicago where she is still active in improvisational comedy at ImprovOlympic and Second City. She is also a clothing designer and has designed her own brand of unique dresses for nearly 20 years. Fans of her dresses have included Ricki Lake and Amy Sedaris.
