= Mike Myers =

Canadian-American actor, comedian, filmmaker, musician, and singer (born 1963)

Mike Myers OC
- Myers in 2026
- Born: Michael John Myers; May 25, 1963 (age 63); Scarborough, Ontario, Canada
- Citizenship: Canada; United Kingdom; United States
- Occupations: Actor; comedian; filmmaker; musician; singer
- Years active: 1975–present
- Spouses: Robin Ruzan (m. 1993; div. 2006) Kelly Tisdale (m. 2010)
- Children: 3
- Relatives: Paul Myers (brother)

Comedy career
- Medium: Books; film; television; theatre; music
- Genres: Black comedy; cringe comedy; deadpan; observational comedy; satire; self-deprecation; musical comedy

Michael John Myers (born May 25, 1963) is a Canadian and American actor, comedian, filmmaker, musician, and singer. His accolades include an Actor Award, seven MTV Movie & TV Awards, and a Primetime Emmy Award. He awarded a star on the Hollywood Walk of Fame in 2002 and an Officer of the Order of Canada in 2017 for his "extensive and acclaimed body of comedic work as an actor, writer, and producer".

Following a series of appearances on several Canadian television programs, Myers attained stardom as a cast member on the NBC sketch comedy series Saturday Night Live from 1989 to 1995, which won him the Primetime Emmy Award for Outstanding Writing for a Variety Series. He portrayed Wayne Campbell in Wayne's World (1992–1993), the title role in Austin Powers (1997–2002), and the title character in the Shrek (2001–present) franchises. Myers also played the title character in the 2003 live-action adaptation of the Dr. Seuss book The Cat in the Hat.

Myers acted sporadically in the 2010s, having supporting roles in Terminal and Bohemian Rhapsody (both 2018). He made his directorial debut with the documentary Supermensch: The Legend of Shep Gordon (2013), which premiered at the Toronto International Film Festival. He created and starred in the 2022 Netflix original series, The Pentaverate, and appeared in David O. Russell's comedy thriller Amsterdam.

== Early life ==
Michael John Myers was born in Scarborough, Ontario, on May 25, 1963, to data processor Alice "Bunny" E. (née Hind) and insurance agent Eric Myers. His parents were British immigrants from the Old Swan area of Liverpool. His mother had served in the Women's Royal Air Force, and his father in the Royal Engineers. He has distant Scottish ancestry. He has two older brothers: Paul, a musician, and Peter, who worked for Sears Canada. He grew up in Scarborough and North York, where he attended and graduated from Stephen Leacock High School in 1982.

One of his neighbours and schoolmates was prominent voice actor Maurice LaMarche.

== Career ==
=== Early career ===
Myers began performing in commercials at 8 years old. At the age of 10, he made a commercial for British Columbia Hydro, with Gilda Radner playing his mother. At 12, he made a guest appearance as Ari on the TV series King of Kensington. At 16, he had a small role in the season 1 episode "Boy on Wheels" of the TV series The Littlest Hobo, as a friend of the episode's protagonist.

After graduating from high school, Myers was accepted into The Second City Canadian touring company. He moved to the United Kingdom, and in 1985 he was one of the founding members of The Comedy Store Players, an improvisational group based at The Comedy Store in London.

The next year, he was a cast member on the British children's TV program Wide Awake Club, parodying the show's normal exuberance with his own "Sound Asleep Club", in partnership with Neil Mullarkey.

He returned to Toronto and The Second City in 1986 as a cast member in The Second City's Toronto main stage show, Second City Theatre. In 1988, he moved from the Second City in Toronto to Chicago. There, he trained, performed and taught at the Improv Olympic.

Myers made many appearances, including as Wayne Campbell, on Toronto's Citytv in the early 1980s, on the alternative video show City Limits hosted by Christopher Ward; Myers also made several appearances after the launch of MuchMusic, for which City Limits was essentially the prototype. Myers also appeared as Wayne Campbell in the music video for Ward's Canadian hit "Boys and Girls".

The Wayne Campbell character was featured extensively in the 1986 summer series It's Only Rock & Roll, produced by Toronto's Insight Production Company for CBC Television. Wayne appeared both in-studio and in a series of location sketches directed and edited by Allan Novak. Myers wrote another sketch, "Kurt and Dieter", co-starring with Second City's Dana Andersen and also directed by Novak, which later became the popular "Sprockets" sketch on Saturday Night Live.

=== Saturday Night Live ===
Myers began appearing on Saturday Night Live on January 21, 1989, and eventually became the first repertory player added to the show's cast in over two years. "He quickly became one of the show's biggest draws thanks to his talent for creating oddball characters with memorable catchphrases", according to Entertainment Weekly. In addition to "Wayne's World" and "Sprockets", Myers starred in the recurring sketches "Lothar of the Hill People", "Stuart Rankin, All Things Scottish", "Lank Thompson", "Middle-Aged Man", "Simon", "Coffee Talk with Linda Richman", "Theatre Stories", "Phillip the Hyper Hypo", and "Scottish Soccer Hooligan Weekly". Myers's last episode as a cast member aired on January 21, 1995, exactly six years to the day after his first episode. He returned to host in 1997 and made an appearance as his film character Dr. Evil in 2014. In March of 2025, Myers made two guest appearances in sketches, portraying Elon Musk.

==== Saturday Night Live characters ====
- Dieter – host of Sprockets
- Linda Richman – hostess of Coffee Talk
- Japanese Game Show Host
- "Handsome Actor" Lank Thompson
- Simon – a young British boy who makes drawings in his bath tub and complains about having "prune hands" (the theme song for this segment was a slightly modified version of the theme song from Simon in the Land of Chalk Drawings by Edward MacLachlan)
- Wayne Campbell (SNL, the Wayne's World films)
- Pat Arnold (SNL, Bill Swerski's Superfans)
- Stuart Rankin – proprietor of "All Things Scottish"
- Lothar (of the Hill People)
- Ed Miles (Middle-Aged Man) – An older man who helps young people with their problems
- Kenneth Reese-Evans – host of "Theatre Stories"
- Johnny Letter – an Old West citizen who writes polite, well-written letters of complaint.

=== Film ===
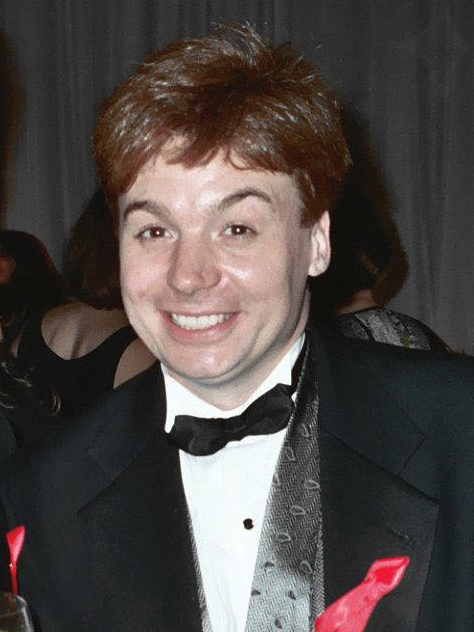
Myers in 1994

Myers made his film debut when he and Dana Carvey adapted their "Wayne's World" SNL sketches into the feature Wayne's World (1992). It was among the most successful films of the year and was followed in 1993 by Wayne's World 2; Myers starred in So I Married an Axe Murderer the same year.

He took a two-year hiatus from performing after the end of his time as an SNL regular. Myers returned to acting with the film Austin Powers: International Man of Mystery (1997), followed by the sequels Austin Powers: The Spy Who Shagged Me (1999) and Austin Powers in Goldmember (2002). Myers played the title role (Austin Powers) and the villain (Dr. Evil) in all three films as well as a henchman (Fat Bastard) and another villain (Goldmember) in the sequels.

One of Myers's rare non-comedic roles came in the film 54 (1998), in which he portrayed Steve Rubell, proprietor of New York City's famous 1970s disco nightclub Studio 54. The film was not critically or commercially successful, though Myers received some positive notice.

In June 2000, Myers was sued by Universal Pictures for $3.8 million for backing out of a contract to make a feature film based on his SNL character Dieter. Myers said he refused to honor the $20 million contract because he felt the script was not ready. Myers countersued and a settlement was reached after several months where Myers agreed to make another film with Universal. That film, The Cat in the Hat, was released in November 2003 and starred Myers as the title character. It received negative reviews and was unsuccessful at the box office.

In 2001, Myers provided the voice of Shrek in the animated film of the same name, having taken over the role after Chris Farley died in December 1997 before recording all of his dialogue. He reprised this role in Shrek 4-D (a theme park ride) in 2003, Shrek 2 (2004), Shrek the Third (2007), the Christmas and Halloween television specials Shrek the Halls (2007) and Scared Shrekless (2010), and Shrek Forever After (2010).

Myers received the MTV Generation Award in June 2007, making him the second Canadian to win the award, following Jim Carrey in 2006.

In 2008, Myers co-wrote, co-produced and starred in the poorly received The Love Guru, and in 2009 had a minor role as British general Ed Fenech in Quentin Tarantino's Inglourious Basterds.

In 2018, after an eight-year hiatus from feature films, Myers appeared in supporting roles in Terminal and Bohemian Rhapsody (both 2018).

As of May 2022, Myers would neither confirm nor deny plans for Austin Powers 4. In July 2024, Myers was announced to reprise the voice of the title character in Shrek 5, scheduled for release on June 30, 2027.

=== Other work ===
Myers had a cameo appearance in Britney Spears' music video "Boys" as Austin Powers. Spears, in turn, made a cameo in Austin Powers in Goldmember, performing "Boys". In a 2005 poll to find The Comedian's Comedian, he was voted among the top 50 comedy acts by fellow comedians and comedy insiders.

Myers is a member of the band Ming Tea along with The Bangles' guitarist and vocalist Susanna Hoffs and musician Matthew Sweet. They performed the songs "BBC" and "Daddy Wasn't There" from the Austin Powers films. In 2011, Myers returned to The Comedy Store in London to perform a one-night-only comeback of his role with The Comedy Store Players. The UK comedy website Chortle praised his performance.

Myers's 2013 directorial debut, Supermensch: The Legend of Shep Gordon, was selected to be screened in the Gala Presentation section at the 2013 Toronto International Film Festival.

From 2017 to 2018, Myers hosted a re-boot of The Gong Show in heavy makeup as a fictional British host known as Tommy Maitland, though his identity was not confirmed until the second season.

An avid follower of Monty Python, in July 2014 Myers appeared on stage at the O2 Arena on the final night of their live show, Monty Python Live (Mostly), and also appears on the documentary telefilm Monty Python: The Meaning of Live.

Myers starred in and executive produced a limited series for Netflix called The Pentaverate, which served as a spin-off of So I Married an Axe Murderer and involved him playing multiple characters.

In March 2022, author and security specialist Gavin de Becker shared that segments of The Gift of Fear Master Class had been directed by Myers.

== Personal life ==
=== Family ===
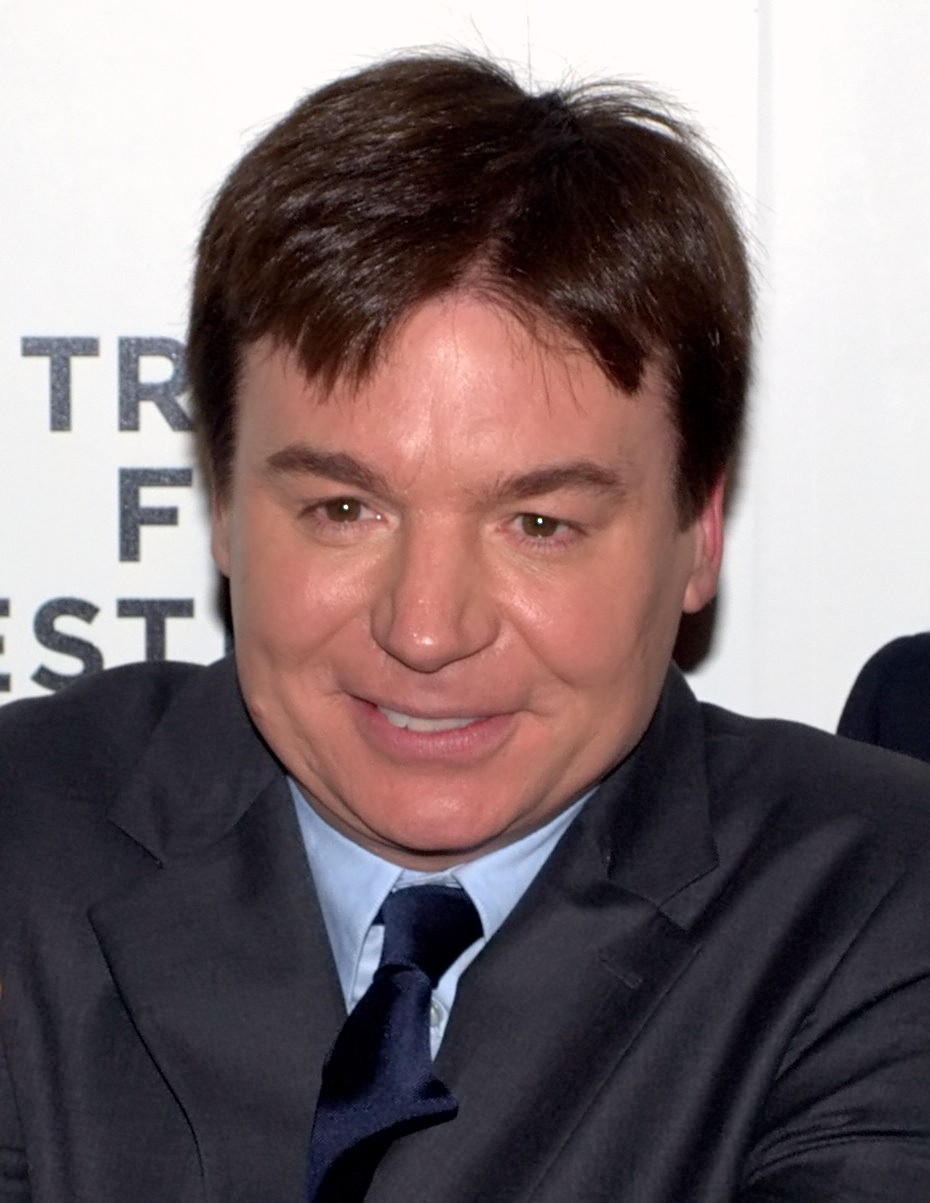
Myers at the Tribeca Film Festival in 2010

Myers began dating actress and comedy writer Robin Ruzan in the late 1980s after meeting at an ice hockey game in Chicago, during which Myers caught a puck and used the incident as an icebreaker to strike up a conversation with Ruzan. The couple were married from 1993 to 2005.

In 2006, Kelly Tisdale confirmed reports that she and Myers were dating. Myers and Tisdale married in New York City in a private ceremony in late 2010. Tisdale is a scenic artist who works in the entertainment industry and a former cafe owner. They have a son and two daughters. They reside in the Tribeca neighbourhood of New York City.

=== Interests ===
Myers is a Dungeons & Dragons player and was one of several celebrities to have participated in the Worldwide Dungeons & Dragons Game Day in 2006. He supports the Toronto Maple Leafs ice hockey team, and named two characters in the first Austin Powers film Commander Gilmour and General Borschevsky, after former-Maple Leafs players Doug Gilmour and Nikolai Borschevsky. He is also a fan of his parents' hometown football team Liverpool.

Myers has played for Hollywood United, a celebrity soccer team. He played in the 2010 Soccer Aid for UNICEF UK football match, England vs. R.O.W (Rest of the World) and scored his penalty during a sudden-death shootout after the game ended 2–2 (June 6, 2010). The Rest of the World team beat England for the first time since the tournament started. In June 2018, during a guest appearance on Late Night with Seth Meyers, Myers stated that Britain is a "rooting interest" for him during soccer games in part because of his parents and because he is also a citizen of the country.

In 2014, Myers starred in a commercial with his brother Peter for Sears Canada, using "humorous banter to spread the message that, despite rumours, Sears wasn't shutting down". Peter at the time was senior director of planning at Sears' head office in Toronto, and he was laid off in 2017 after Sears Canada filed for bankruptcy.

In 2016, Myers published a book, Canada, a memoir interwoven with reflections on his native country's history and popular culture and Prime Minister Justin Trudeau. Myers makes mention of his favourite Canadian band Max Webster among others such as Led Zeppelin.

=== Politics ===
In the 2004 Democratic Party presidential primaries, Myers endorsed Democratic candidate Wesley Clark. In 2005, Myers was unwittingly drawn into political controversy when he appeared with co-presenter Kanye West at the Hurricane Katrina televised relief fund-raiser. Before a visibly stunned Myers, West went off-script and - among other things - proclaimed that "George Bush doesn't care about black people." The moment has become an oft-quoted internet meme. Myers later reimagined the situation on a 2025 episode of SNL:50 with Kenan Thompson playing Kanye.

In the Last Week Tonight episode on the 2015 Canadian federal election, Myers appeared on a snowplow in a mounties uniform, telling Canadians not to vote for Stephen Harper.

During the 2025 trade war between Canada and the United States, which was marked by US President Donald Trump's calls for the annexation of Canada as America's 51st state, Myers appeared on Saturday Night Live on March 1 and attracted attention for wearing a T-shirt with the slogan "Canada is not for sale". In a subsequent appearance on March 8, he made an "elbows up" gesture, a hockey-related phrase that had been used to express willingness to confront Trump. Myers was credited with amplifying "elbows up" as part of Canadian nationalist sentiment. He then appeared in a campaign ad for the Liberal Party of Canada alongside Prime Minister Mark Carney in advance of the 2025 federal election.

== Filmography ==
=== Film ===
Year	Title	Credited as			Role	Notes
Year	Title	Actor	Writer	Producer	Role	Notes
1992	Wayne's World	Yes	Yes	No	Wayne Campbell	
1993	So I Married an Axe Murderer	Yes	Yes (uncredited)	No	Charlie McKenzie / Stuart McKenzie	Extensively rewrote the script with Neil Mullarkey
1993	Wayne's World 2	Yes	Yes	No	Wayne Campbell	
1997	Austin Powers: International Man of Mystery	Yes	Yes	Yes	Austin Powers / Dr. Evil	
1998	54	Yes	No	No	Steve Rubell	
1998	The Thin Pink Line	Yes	No	No	Tim Broderick	
1998	Pete's Meteor	Yes	No	No	Pete	
1999	Austin Powers: The Spy Who Shagged Me	Yes	Yes	Yes	Austin Powers / Dr. Evil / Fat Bastard	
1999	Mystery, Alaska	Yes	No	No	Donnie Shulzhoffer	
2001	Shrek	Yes	No	No	Shrek / Blind Mouse / Opening Narration	Voice
2002	Austin Powers in Goldmember	Yes	Yes	Yes	Austin Powers / Dr. Evil / Fat Bastard / Goldmember	
2003	Nobody Knows Anything!	Yes	No	No	'Eye' Witness	
2003	View from the Top	Yes	No	No	John Witney	
2003	The Cat in the Hat	Yes	Yes (uncredited)	No	The Cat in the Hat / Mr Catwrench / the guy in the sweater who asks all the obvious questions / Kupkake-inator Inventor / Zumzizeroo Man	
2004	Shrek 2	Yes	No	No	Shrek	Voice
2006	Home	Yes	No	No	Himself	Documentary
2007	Shrek the Third	Yes	No	No	Shrek	Voice
2008	The Love Guru	Yes	Yes	Yes	Guru Maurice Pitka / Himself	
2009	Inglourious Basterds	Yes	No	No	General Ed Fenech	
2010	Shrek Forever After	Yes	No	No	Shrek	Voice
2012	Oscar Etiquette	Yes	No	No	Sir Cecil Worthington	Short film
2013	Supermensch: The Legend of Shep Gordon	Yes	No	Yes	Himself	Documentary, also director
2015	Being Canadian	Yes	No	No	Himself	Documentary
2015	I Am Chris Farley	Yes	No	No	Himself	Documentary
2017	Last Knight	Yes	No	No	Vodyanoy	Voice
2018	Terminal	Yes	No	No	Janitor / Night Superintendent / Supe / Clinton Sharp / Mr Franklyn	
2018	Bohemian Rhapsody	Yes	No	No	Ray Foster	
2022	Amsterdam	Yes	No	No	Paul Canterbury	
2026	Lorne	Yes	No	No	Himself	Documentary
2026	Michael	Yes	No	No	Walter Yetnikoff	
2027	Shrek 5	Yes	No	No	Shrek	Voice, In production

=== Television ===
Year	Title	Role	Notes
1975	King of Kensington	Ari	Episode: "Scout's Honour"
1977	Range Ryder and the Calgary Kid	Himself	
1979	The Littlest Hobo	Tommy	Episode: "Boy on Wheels"
1980	Bizarre	Various	
1983–1984	City Limits	Wayne Campbell	Various episodes
1985	John and Yoko: A Love Story	Delivery Boy	Uncredited; Television film
1986–1987	Wide Awake Club	Sound Asleep Club	2 episodes
1987	Meet Julie	(voice)	Television film
1987	It's Only Rock & Roll	Various	13 episodes
1987	110 Lombard Street	Mike	Television pilot
1989	Elvis Stories	Cockney Man	Television short
1989–1995, 1997, 2003, 2005, 2011, 2014, 2015, 2025–2026	Saturday Night Live	Various	123 episodes; also writer
1991	Saturday Night Live: Halloween Special	Wayne Campbell	Television special
1992	64th Academy Awards	Wayne Campbell	Television special
1992	Saturday Night Live: All the Best for Mother's Day	Himself	Television special
1997	1997 MTV Movie Awards	Himself (host)	Television special
2007	Shrek the Halls	Shrek	Voice; Television special
2008	2008 MTV Movie Awards	Himself (host)	Television special
2008	Saturday Night Live: The Best of Mike Myers	Himself	Television special
2010	Scared Shrekless	Shrek	Voice; Television special
2014	Monty Python Live (Mostly)	Himself	Television special
2015	Last Week Tonight with John Oliver	Himself	Episode: "Canada"
2015	Saturday Night Live 40th Anniversary Special	Wayne Campbell	Television special
2017–2018	The Gong Show	Tommy Maitland (host)	20 episodes; also executive producer
2018	The Tonight Show Starring Jimmy Fallon	Dr. Evil	2 episodes
2022	The Pentaverate	Various roles	6 episodes; also creator, writer, and executive producer
2025	Saturday Night Live 50th Anniversary Special	Linda Richman	Television special

=== Theme parks ===
Year	Title	Voice role
1994	Hurler	Wayne Campbell
2003	Shrek 4-D	Shrek

=== Music videos ===
- Madonna: "Beautiful Stranger" (1999) as Austin Powers
- Britney Spears: "Boys" (2002) as Austin Powers
- Smash Mouth: "Hang On" (2003)

== Awards and honours ==
=== Honours ===
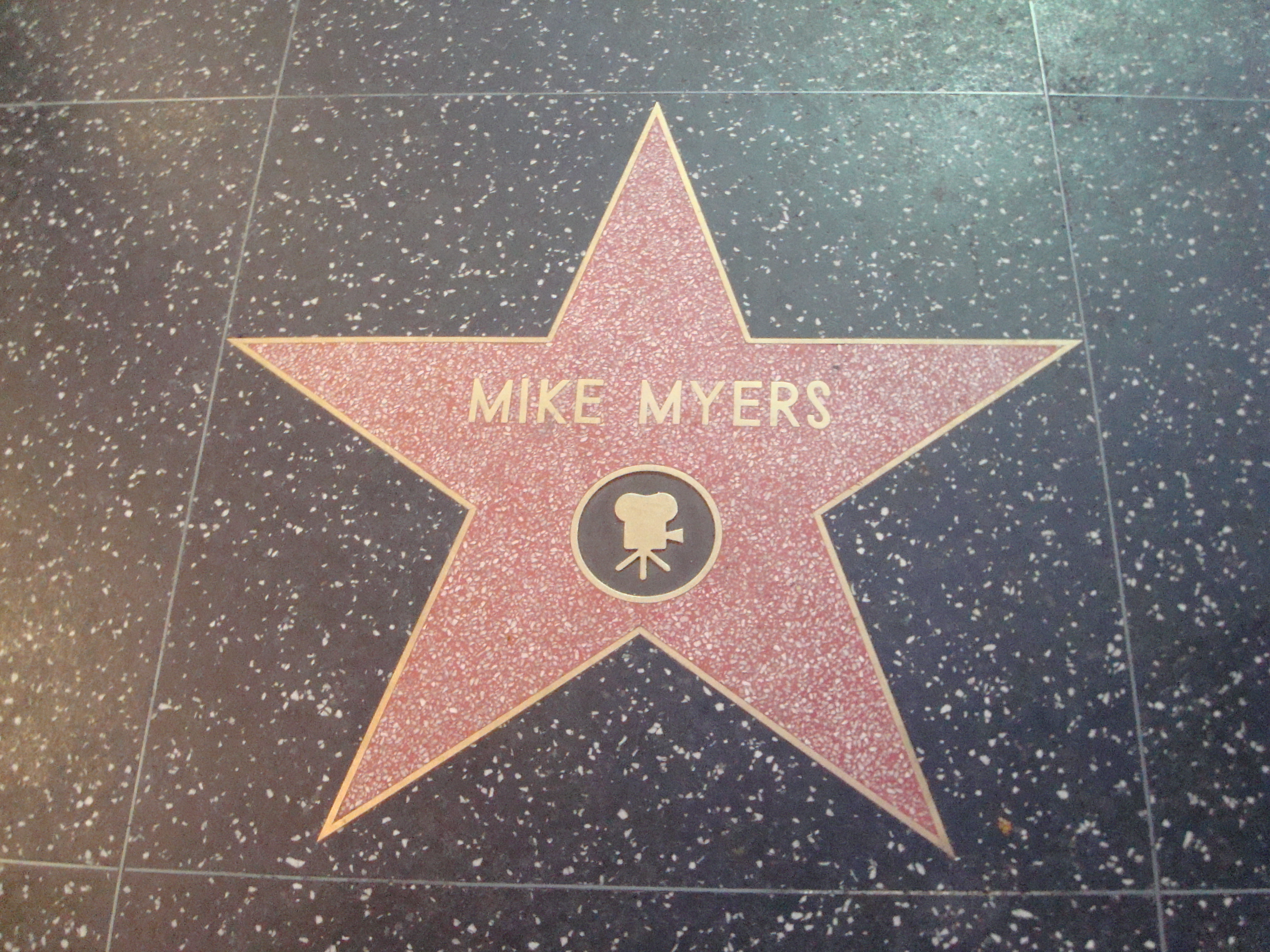
Myers's Hollywood Walk of Fame star

- In 2002, Mike Myers was honoured with a star on the Hollywood Walk of Fame at 7042 Hollywood Boulevard.
- Also in 2002, Myers was honoured in his native Scarborough, Toronto with a street named after him, "Mike Myers Drive".
- In 2003, he was inducted into Canada's Walk of Fame.
- In 2014, his face was put on a stamp by Canada Post.
- In 2017, he was named an Officer of the Order of Canada by Governor General David Johnston for "his extensive and acclaimed body of comedic work as an actor, writer and producer".
- In 2026, Myers received the Academy Icon Award at the 14th Canadian Screen Awards.
