= Melanie Hutsell =

American actress

- Occupations: Actress, comedian, writer
- Years active: 1990–1999, 2008–present

Melanie Hutsell is an American actress, comedian, and writer. She is best known for her work as a cast member on the NBC sketch comedy series Saturday Night Live from 1991 to 1994.

== Career ==
Melanie Hutsell began her career performing improv comedy at the Annoyance Theater in Chicago and starred in its production of The Real Live Brady Bunch in 1990. The comedic stage show consisted of eight actual episodes of the TV show The Brady Bunch, with Hutsell cast as Jan Brady. The company toured to New York City, where Hutsell was hired as a cast member for the 17th season of Saturday Night Live.

Hutsell was a performer on Saturday Night Live, from 1991 to 1993 as featured player, then from 1993 to 1994 as main cast member. While on the show, she reprised her stage portrayal of Jan Brady for a series of Weekend Update and other sketch appearances, making it one of Hutsell's biggest characters while on the show. Other recurring characters included sorority pledge Di in a series of sketches about the sorority girls of Delta Delta Delta, which she starred in alongside fellow castmates Siobhan Fallon and Beth Cahill. Her notable celebrity impressions on Saturday Night Live included Tori Spelling, Charo, Monica Seles, Tammy Wynette, and Tonya Harding. Hutsell left Saturday Night Live after three seasons in 1994.

She returned from retirement in 2008, appearing in He's Such a Girl, a 2008 comedy also starring Ed Begley Jr. In May 2009, she appeared as a guest on Best Dishes with Paula Deen on the Food Network, where she appeared in character as Paula Deen's impersonator. She stated that she was making a comeback, focusing on writing. She played the role of Carol in the 2011 comedy hit Bridesmaids.

From 2015 to 2017, she appeared with recurring roles as Kristen Rhydholm-Rhydholm in the Netflix series Lady Dynamite, and as Jocelyn in the Amazon series Transparent.

She most recently wrote and starred in the comedic drama Mother's Little Helpers, which premiered at SXSW film festival in 2019.

== Filmography ==
=== Film ===
Year	Title	Role	Notes
1998	The Thin Pink Line	Yvette Evy	
1999	Can't Stop Dancing	Winnie	
2011	Bridesmaids	Annie's Tennis Partner	
2013	Grown Ups 2	Kmart mother	
2018	Father of the Year	Trey's Mom	

=== Television ===
Year	Title	Role	Notes
1991–1994	Saturday Night Live	Various	
1995	Brotherly Love	Wilma	Episode: "Witchcraft"
2009	In The Motherhood	Instructor	Episode: "Where There's a Will There's a Wake"
2010	United States of Tara	Waitress	Episode: "To Have and to Hold"
2011	Working Class	Donna	Episode: "B-Day Invasion"
2015–2016	Transparent	Jocelyn	
2016–2017	Lady Dynamite	Kristen Rhydholm-Rhydholm	
