= Ellen Cleghorne =

American actress and comedian (born 1965)

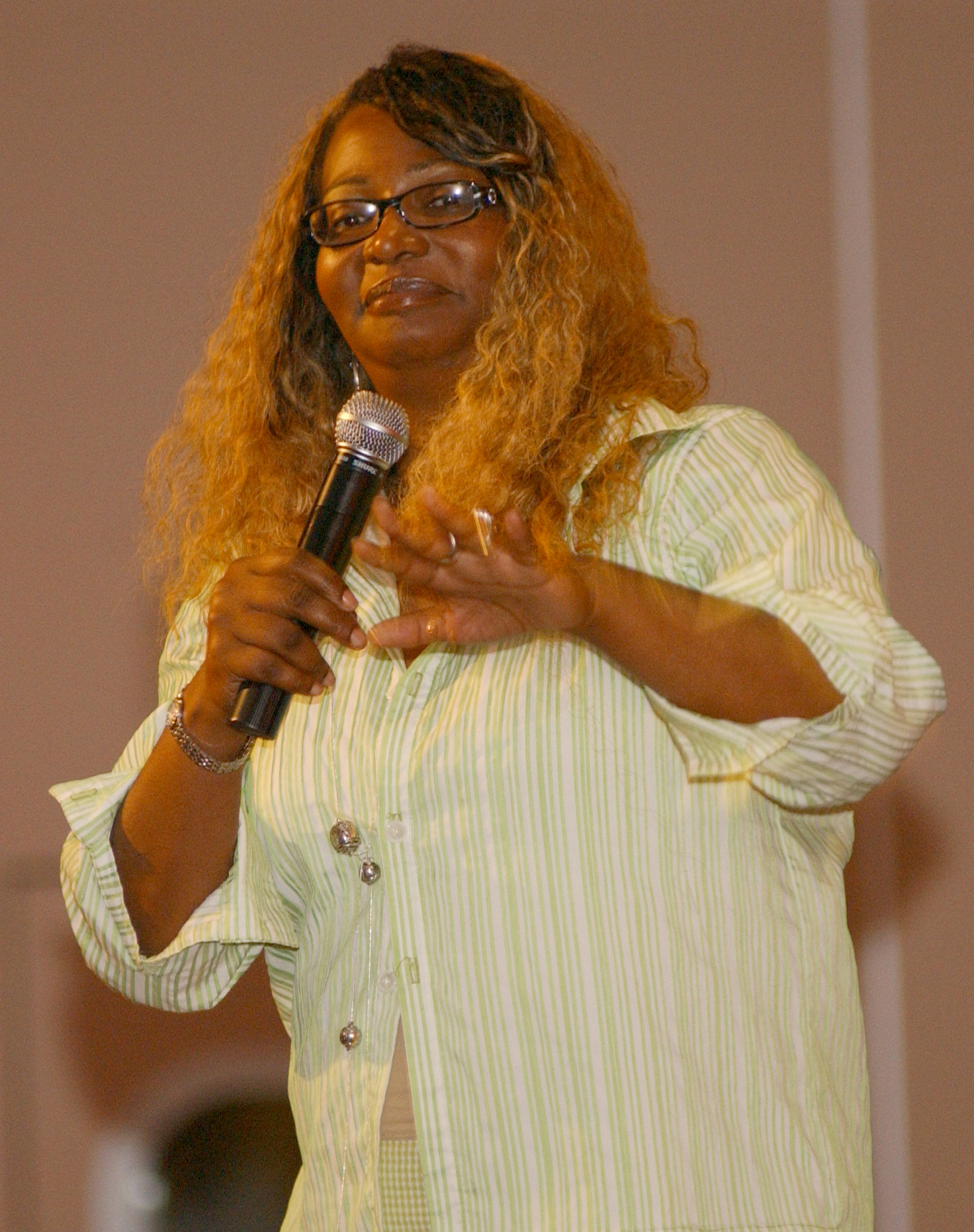
- Cleghorne at the La Bella Vista Club in 2008
- Born: November 29, 1965 (age 60); New York City, U.S.
- Education: Hunter College
- Occupations: Actress; comedian
- Years active: 1984–present
- Children: 1

Ellen Leslye Cleghorne (born November 29, 1965) is an American actress and comedian. Cleghorne is best known for her tenure as a cast member on the NBC sketch comedy series Saturday Night Live from 1991 to 1995. She was the sketch comedy show's second African-American female repertory cast member, succeeding Danitra Vance in its eleventh season, and the first African-American female cast member to stay for more than one season. She returned for its 40th anniversary special on February 15, 2015. Cleghorne was ranked the 69th greatest Saturday Night Live cast member by Rolling Stone magazine.

== Early life ==
A native of the Red Hook, Brooklyn, New York City, Cleghorne is a graduate of Brooklyn Technical High School and Hunter College.

== Career ==
Cleghorne joined Saturday Night Live in 1991, and remained on the show for four seasons until 1995. During her tenure she performed impressions such as Alfre Woodard, Dr. Dre, Anita Baker, Florence Griffith Joyner, Debbie Allen, Mary J. Blige, Natalie Cole, Patti LaBelle, Marla Gibbs, Robin Quivers, Toni Morrison, Joycelyn Elders, Tina Turner, and Whoopi Goldberg. She also had two recurring characters: Zoraida, an NBC page, and Queen Shenequa, who appeared frequently on the recurring Weekend Update sketch. Cleghorne was the third black woman to be credited on Saturday Night Live, after Yvonne Hudson and Danitra Vance, and the first woman of color to appear on the series as a full-fledged cast member for longer than a single season. She later said, "I was the first [woman of color] cast member ... with a contract. And if you read, or do research, they didn't used to give black people contracts on SNL. That was cold-blooded. They didn't even give them credit. The credits roll, your name's not even on there. That was a joke because that's how you got residuals." Her former Saturday Night Live costar Jay Mohr's book Gasping for Airtime notes that Cleghorne did not get along well with some of the other cast members during her time on the show. He also mentions a tiff with host Sally Field during a pitch meeting.

In 1995, Cleghorne left SNL to star as single mother Ellen Carlson on Cleghorne!, a sitcom that aired for one season on The WB network, and which also starred fellow SNL alumnus Garrett Morris, and Sherri Shepherd in her first acting role. Cleghorne later said, "I don't think I was ready. In terms of being strong and saying, 'I can write, this is what I do,' and feel confident in that. And to be able to say, 'No, this does not work, this works better.'"

In 1993 and 1994, Cleghorne made appearances on the Nickelodeon children's TV show The Adventures of Pete and Pete playing a bus driver who served as the love interest of Pete's regular bus driver. She later appeared in independent films and comedies including Mr. Wrong (1996), Armageddon (1998), Coyote Ugly (2000), Little Nicky (2000), and Old School (2003). She has also had a series of skits played on Sirius XM Radio's Raw Dog Comedy channel.

Cleghorne was mentioned on a segment of the Family Guy DVD Stewie Griffin: The Untold Story, when Stewie asks if "they ever found a suitable vehicle for Ellen Cleghorne." Seth MacFarlane claimed that she called the show's staff about the joke, which Cleghorne has denied.

In 2013, Cleghorne played Mary Fluzoo in Grown Ups 2.

In 2015, Cleghorne was one of the contestants for Worst Cooks in America: Celebrity Edition, finishing in 3rd place. The same year she appeared in the 40th anniversary special of Saturday Night Live, calling the experience "a cleansing".

In 2022, Cleghorne started voicing Mayor Sitwell for PBS animated series City Island.

== Saturday Night Live ==
=== Celebrity impressions ===
- Alfre Woodard
- Alice Walker
- Amy Fisher
- Anita Baker
- Anita Hill
- Debbie Allen
- Dr. Dre
- Florence Griffith Joyner
- Gladys Knight
- Isabel Sanford
- Jackée Harry
- Joycelyn Elders
- Kim Wayans
- Marguerite Whitley Simpson
- Marla Gibbs
- Mary J. Blige
- Natalie Cole
- Norma Quarles
- Patti LaBelle
- Robin Quivers
- Ruby Dee
- Sister Souljah
- Tina Turner
- Toni Morrison
- Whoopi Goldberg

=== Recurring characters ===
- Queen Shenequa, an Afrocentric social critic who dressed in African garb, observed Kwanzaa, and made commentaries on race.
- Zoraida, an exuberant but short-tempered NBC page who pesters the celebrity hosts of the show as they prepare backstage. Usually, when the celebrity grew tired of her bothering them and would try to leave, she would suddenly become angry and threaten them.

In 2018, she played the role of Shaniqua in Second Act.

== Education ==
In 2014 Cleghorne received her PhD in Performance Studies at NYU's Tisch School of the Arts.
