= Perv =

Perv or PERV may refer to:

- Perversion
- Porcine endogenous retrovirus
- PERVS (Porcine endogenous retroviruses)
- The Pervs (fictional characters) from videogame Manhunt 2

== See also ==
- Merv the Perv (fictional character) a 2000s character from Saturday Night Live (SNL)
