= Sally O'Malley =

Sally O'Malley may refer to:

- A character in Horton Hears a Who! (film)
- A recurring character on Saturday Night Live, played by Molly Shannon
