= Recurring Saturday Night Live characters and sketches introduced 2019–20 =

The following is a list of recurring Saturday Night Live characters and sketches introduced during the forty-fifth season of SNL, which began on September 28, 2019.

== Mid-Day News ==
A pair of black news anchors (Kenan Thompson and Ego Nwodim) and a pair of white news anchors (the episode's host and another cast member) play a "game" in which they guess if the person of interest in a news story, usually involving crime, is either black or white.

| Season | Episode | Host | Notes |
|---|---|---|---|
| 45 | October 5, 2019 | Phoebe Waller-Bridge | Chris Redd plays Dennis Jones, a black weatherman who keeps tabs on the "game"'s current "score". |
| 50 | March 1, 2025 | Shane Gillis | Devon Walker plays Shelton Holmes, a black traffic reporter who also keeps track of the "score". |

== Chen Biao ==
Chen Biao (Bowen Yang) is a Chinese diplomat who guests on Weekend Update to discuss various topics of Chinese/American relations with Michael Che. He has different titles such as "Chinese Trade Representative" or "Chinese Health Minister" depending on the topic. For a Chinese official he's surprisingly casual, flamboyant, and well versed in American culture.

| Season | Episode | Host | Notes |
|---|---|---|---|
| 45 | October 5, 2019 | Phoebe Waller-Bridge | Biao discusses the US-China Trade War. He loves the attention it brings him as China's "trade daddy." |
| 45 | December 14, 2019 | Scarlett Johansson | Biao discusses the US-China Trade Deal and the end of the trade war. He doesn't need that "drama" in his life. |
| 45 | February 1, 2020 | J. J. Watt | Biao discusses the Coronavirus after the WHO declared it a global emergency. |
| 46 | October 3, 2020 | Chris Rock | Biao discusses a potential American ban of TikTok. |
| 47 | January 22, 2022 | Will Forte | Biao discusses the upcoming Beijing 2022 Olympics. |
| 50 | April 12, 2025 | Jon Hamm | Biao discusses the tariffs imposed by the Trump administration. |

== SoulCycle Instructors ==
Various SoulCycle instructors are excessively high-energy and give unhinged monologues during classes.

| Season | Episode | Host | Notes |
|---|---|---|---|
| 45 | October 12, 2019 | David Harbour | Colorful prospectives (Harbour, Bowen Yang, Heidi Gardner, Kate McKinnon) overshare as they audition to become SoulCycle instructors. |
| 45 | April 25, 2020 | Saturday Night Live at Home (no host) | |

== Competing Sisters ==
In classic 1950s black and white movies, two sisters try to kill each other in competition for a potential husband but both lose out to a more attractive third option.

| Season | Episode | Host | Notes |
|---|---|---|---|
| 45 | December 7, 2019 | Jennifer Lopez | "What Do You Figure Is Goin' On In That House?" The Corporal (Beck Bennett) is coming for a visit to pick a wife. |
| 45 | February 29, 2020 | John Mulaney | "Say, Those Two Don't Seem To Like Each Other" The Admiral (Bennett) is coming to pick a wife. He's much more interested in their "twink" sailor brother (Mulaney.) |

== Baby Yoda ==
Kyle Mooney impersonates Baby Yoda, though an adult version who speaks and is very aware of his success.

| Season | Episode | Host | Notes |
|---|---|---|---|
| 45 | December 14, 2019 | Scarlett Johansson | Baby Yoda stops by Weekend Update to talk about his newfound fame. |
| 46 | October 31, 2020 | John Mulaney | Baby Yoda stops by Weekend Update to discuss the return of The Mandalorian. |
| 46 | January 30, 2021 | John Krasinski | TV show characters (including Mooney as Baby Yoda) perform renditions of their show's opening credits songs. |
| 46 | May 8, 2021 | Elon Musk | Baby Yoda stops by Weekend Update to discuss Star Wars Day celebrations. |
| 47 | November 20, 2021 | Simu Liu | Baby Yoda stops by Weekend Update to discuss his Thanksgiving plans and dating life. |
| 47 | May 14, 2022 | Selena Gomez | Baby Yoda stops by Weekend Update to discuss his spiritual awakening. |

== Sleepover Incident ==
An embarrassing disaster occurs at a girls' sleepover and Megan (Kate McKinnon) is obviously responsible but denies it. The house is eventually destroyed in a cascading series of problems caused by Megan's attempts to cover up the incident.

| Season | Episode | Host | Notes |
|---|---|---|---|
| 45 | January 25, 2020 | Adam Driver | Driver is hosting a sleepover and asks which girl destroyed the upstairs toilet. |
| 46 | December 5, 2020 | Jason Bateman | Bateman asks which girl left a big menstrual period stain on the couch. |

== Uncle Meme ==
A man (John Mulaney) confronts his nephew about creating insulting viral Impact font memes with his image.

| Season | Episode | Host | Notes |
|---|---|---|---|
| 45 | February 29, 2020 | John Mulaney | While celebrating his daughter being accepted to school, the uncle confronts his nephew about turning him into memes. |
| 46 | October 31, 2020 | John Mulaney | The uncle confronts his nephew about once again turning him into memes this time at work, as he's an intern at the uncle's company. |

== MasterClass Quarantine Edition ==
Chloe Fineman (primarily) does impressions of celebrities offering MasterClass courses from their homes.

| Season | Episode | Host | Notes |
|---|---|---|---|
| 45 | April 11, 2020 | Tom Hanks | MasterClass advertises lessons about fashion from Timothée Chalamet, TikTok tutorials from JoJo Siwa and Carole Baskin teaching bike riding. |
| 45 | May 9, 2020 | Kristen Wiig | MasterClass advertises lessons about journaling from Phoebe Waller-Bridge, suits from John Mulaney (Melissa Villaseñor) and Britney Spears teaching something. |

| Preceded by Recurring Saturday Night Live characters and sketches introduced 2018–19 | Recurring Saturday Night Live characters and sketches (listed chronologically) | Succeeded by Recurring Saturday Night Live characters and sketches introduced 2020–21 |
