= Recurring Saturday Night Live characters and sketches introduced 1994–95 =

US TV show characters

The following is a list of recurring Saturday Night Live characters and sketches introduced between September 24, 1994, and May 13, 1995, the twentieth season of SNL.

== Gil Graham ==
An Adam Sandler character. Debuted September 24, 1994. Graham was a reviewer of recent concerts for Weekend Update. His reviews ultimately turned out to be accounts of unfortunate events that prevented him from attending the concerts (giving his tickets to two teenage girls who promised to give him $2000 that was never received; buying scalped tickets that turned out to be from a Molly Hatchet concert from 1974; Graham's mother throwing out his Soundgarden tickets thinking they were drugs). When Graham was able to attend a concert, something catastrophic would happen to him (typically getting brutally beaten or in one case getting trapped inside a portable toilet that caught fire). Despite his misfortune, Graham's reviews were always positive.

== Religious Cult ==
An Adam Sandler and David Spade sketch. Debuted October 15, 1994

== Good Morning Brooklyn ==
Good Morning Brooklyn is a morning talk show hosted by Brooklynites who spoke in Italian American vernacular using heavy New York accents. Its hosts were James Barone (Jay Mohr) and Angela Tucci (played first by Sarah Jessica Parker, then by Courteney Cox). The two often got into shouting matches, yelling "Shut up!", "No, you shut up!" back and forth until they cut to a "Please Stand By" graphic. Barone frequently used the expression, "Fugheddaboudit!" Debuted November 12, 1994.

Also featured were traffic and weather reporter Anthony (pronounced Ant'ny, played by Michael McKean), who gave vague and uninformative reports (such as, "It's hot as a bastard!"), and field reporter Molly Fahey (Molly Shannon), who, when asked if her name was Italian, admits, "No, but it's Catholic", which James replies is "good enough".

Adam Sandler played Angelo, a guest whose entrance was always accompanied by his yelling at an off-screen antagonist ("No, you move your car!" or "No, you suck my ass!"). In one sketch, Angelo hosted a segment called "Beatin' of the Week", in which someone would receive a beating for making derogatory remarks about Italians. Chris Farley played a hot dog vendor who was discovered by Fahey, and was the unfortunate recipient of said beating for his comment that "IROC" was an acronym for "Italian Retard Out Cruising".

The character James Barone later appeared in an unrelated sketch about a Civil War documentary, in which uninformed high school dropouts commented on the American Civil War.

== Scottish Soccer Hooligan Weekly ==
A fictitious talk show hosted by shaven-head Scottish soccer fans Andy Gray (Mike Myers) and Ian Daeglish (Mark McKinney) that aired on ESPN2. The hosts are presumably named after real Scottish footballing legends, Andy Gray and Kenny Dalglish. This show was a weekly show for rowdy Scottish soccer fans, referred to as "Hooligans." McKinney often gets his nose broken by Myers, and Myers often vomits from drinking too much beer. There were several fake sponsors including "Bollocks" brand hot dogs. Myers would often begin by saying "Let's get down to business because I'm steamin' PISS DRUNK, and I'm gonna be SICK! or such colorful variations as "I'm gonna honk. I'm gonna paint this room like an esophageal Jackson Pollock canvas." Memorable topics of discussion included "Effigies: are they really worth the trouble? Why not burn the real people?" and "odd things I've found in me vomit after rioting". In one episode David Hyde Pierce plays a character claiming to be an American "tennis hooligan". "I choose the player I hate, and when they're about to serve I do something distracting like yawn or shift in my seat. One time I coughed really loud." Debuted January 21, 1995.

Appearances

Season	Episode	Host	Notes
20	January 21, 1995	David Hyde Pierce	
22	March 22, 1997	Mike Myers	

== Perspectives with Lionel Osbourne ==
In this mid-to-late 1990s series of sketches, Lionel Osbourne (played by Tim Meadows) hosts a seven-minute television series primarily dealing with African-American issues and based in New York City. In the skit's universe, the show starts at 4:53 a.m. early Sunday mornings on WNBC-TV, which carries it before signing off for maintenance to maliciously comply with the FCC's public affairs commitments. Osbourne is generally clueless to the accomplishments of the guests on his show, regularly asking them ill-informed and obtuse questions which confuse the guest. Also, Osbourne pauses after nearly every dialogue sequence with his guest to announce the time and to re-identify the show, which would always follow the format: "It's (time) in the a.m., and you're watching Perspectives. I'm your host, Lionel Osbourne. With me today is (guest).", followed by recap of the conversation so far which declines in quality with each repetition. Debuted January 21, 1995.

In one sketch, Osbourne interviewed Dr. Emory Coleman (played by David Alan Grier), host of the television show Viewpoint - which was identical to Perspectives (except that it aired on WCBS-TV an hour later), but with Coleman as host and Osbourne as the guest. The sketch repeatedly cut back and forth between Perspectives and Viewpoint, causing even the hosts to become confused as to which show they were on.

Appearances

Season	Episode	Host	Notes
20	January 21, 1995	David Hyde Pierce	Guest: Dr. Angela Coleman, Director of the African American Children's Museum (played by Ellen Cleghorne)
20	February 18, 1995	Deion Sanders	Guest: the Rev. Dr. Kwame Gaines, director of the Uptown Boys Athletic Club (played by Sanders)
20	April 8, 1995	Damon Wayans	
21	December 9, 1995	David Alan Grier	Guest: Dr. Emory Coleman, host of WCBS-TV community service program "Viewpoints" (played by Grier), which is almost exactly the same as Perspectives
22	November 2, 1996	Chris Rock	Guest: Kareem Abdul Gaines, community activist and founder of The Brotherhood of Responsible Brothers Who Are Fathers (played by Rock)
22	April 12, 1997	Rob Lowe	Guest: Jermaine Allensworth, player for the Pittsburgh Pirates Major League Baseball team (played by Tracy Morgan)
23	November 22, 1997	Rudy Giuliani	Guest: Giuliani, New York City mayor

== Zagat’s ==
Chris Farley and Adam Sandler play married couple Beverly and Hank Gelfand. Beverly goes through the Zagat Restaurant Guide and talks about all the possibilities on where to eat, while Hank grows weary and disinterested. Debuted February 25, 1995.

Appearances

Season	Episode	Host	Notes
20	February 25, 1995	George Clooney	
20	May 13, 1995	David Duchovny	

== Mighty Mack Blues ==
Mighty Mack Blues is a member of the Blues Brothers, though not an original. He is a replacement for John Belushi's Jake Blues since John Belushi died in 1982. Mighty Mack was introduced on the March 25, 1995, episode where he hosted with musical guest The Tragically Hip, announcing that since he (John Goodman) was hosting for the sixth time, he can do what he wanted and he wanted to perform with special guest and former castmember Dan Aykroyd as the newest incarnation of The Blues Brothers. The movie Blues Brothers 2000 has Aykroyd and Goodman as the new Blues Brothers.

Appearances

Season	Episode	Host	Notes
20	March 25, 1995	John Goodman	
23	February 7, 1998	John Goodman	
27	November 3, 2001	John Goodman	

== Melanie the Babysitter ==
A Mark McKinney sketch. Debuted April 15, 1995.

Preceded by Recurring Saturday Night Live characters and sketches introduced 1993–94	Recurring Saturday Night Live characters and sketches (listed chronologically)	Succeeded by Recurring Saturday Night Live characters and sketches introduced 1995–96
