= Earth to America (2005 TV film) =

2005 television special

- Earth to America
- Genre: Comedy
- Directed by: Ron de Moraes; Jay Roach; Robert B. Weide
- Presented by: Tom Hanks
- Country of origin: United States

Production
- Production locations: Caesars Palace, Las Vegas

Original release
- Network: TBS
- Release: November 20, 2005

Earth to America was a 2-hour television special that aired on TBS on November 20, 2005. Hosted by Tom Hanks, the star-studded show used a comic approach to raise awareness about global warming, and other environmental issues. It was taped at Caesars Palace in Las Vegas.

== Performers ==
- Tom Hanks
- Jack Black
- Cedric the Entertainer
- Rob Corddry
- Larry David
- Will Ferrell
- Julia Louis-Dreyfus
- Bill Maher
- Steve Martin
- Kevin Nealon (Subliminal Man)
- Ray Romano
- Martin Short (Nathan Thurm)
- Ben Stiller
- Wanda Sykes
- Robin Williams
- The cast of Avenue Q
- Robert F. Kennedy Jr.
- Triumph the Insult Comic Dog
- Blue Man Group
- SpongeBob SquarePants
