= Recurring Saturday Night Live characters and sketches introduced 1993–94 =

The following is a list of recurring Saturday Night Live characters and sketches introduced between September 25, 1993, and May 14, 1994, the nineteenth season of SNL.

== Milton (Office Space) ==
A series of animated shorts by Mike Judge that were the basis for his 1999 film Office Space. Debuted September 25, 1993.

== Out Of Africa ("You put your weed in there!") ==
A Rob Schneider sketch. Schneider played a hippie who owned an artifact shop. When a customer would ask about an item, the owner would give an articulate response behind its creation, and then when asked what it was used for, he remarked "You put your weed in there!" In the second sketch, police showed up to investigate a robbery of the store. Schneider becomes nervous at the sight of law enforcement (despite being the one to have summoned them), and admits his shop is loaded with marijuana resulting in his arrest. Debuted September 25, 1993.

Appearances

Season	Episode	Host	Notes
19	September 25, 1993	Charles Barkley	
19	October 30, 1993	Christian Slater	

== The Denise Show ==
The Denise Show revolved around Adam Sandler's character (Brian), who broke up with his girlfriend Denise (played by Shannen Doherty), and has yet to accept that the relationship is over. He would feature guests who had seen Denise, and take phone calls. Calls with his father (played by Phil Hartman) would result in shouting matches about how disappointed he was with his son, with Brian eventually hanging up on him. Debuted October 2, 1993.

The show appeared to come to an end when, later in the season, Denise's friend (played by Nicole Kidman) appeared on the show and became Brian's new girlfriend. However, a later broadcast revisited the sketch, revealing that Brian had broken up with Denise's friend because they did not share the same interests (which mainly included stalking Denise).

It was revealed on the show's final episode that Brian had previously hosted "The Linda Show" as a teenager in the late 1970s. Though Brian claimed it was entirely different from "The Denise Show", it was in fact exactly the same, but with a different ex-girlfriend. Linda (played by Nancy Kerrigan), who had moved to Florida after breaking up with Brian, makes a surprise appearance on "The Denise Show", as she is in town visiting her aunt for two weeks. The couple reunites, with Brian saying that "The Denise Show" would go on a two-week hiatus and probably be followed upon its return by an all-new version of "The Linda Show."

Appearances

Season	Episode	Host	Notes
19	October 2, 1993	Shannen Doherty	
19	November 20, 1993	Nicole Kidman	
19	March 12, 1994	Nancy Kerrigan	

== Ike Turner ==
Tim Meadows portrays Ike Turner on Weekend Update.

Appearances

Season	Episode	Host	Notes
19	October 2, 1993	Shannen Doherty	
19	November 20, 1993	Nicole Kidman	
19	February 12, 1994	Alec Baldwin, Kim Basinger	

== Christopher Walken's Celebrity Psychic Friends Network ==
A Jay Mohr sketch. Christopher Walken (Mohr) hosts a call-in show where he invites callers to consult him for psychic insights, even offering to join callers in their home. He and his guest oddball celebrities (Todd Bridges, Juliette Lewis, Crispin Glover, Gary Busey) creep out the audience to the point that no one calls in. Debuted October 9, 1993.

== Karl's Video ==
A David Spade sketch. Karl ran a video store and would frequently get celebrity customers, such as episode hosts Jeff Goldblum and Bob Saget (the latter of whom he claims to be good friends with in the first sketch, though when he appears in the second sketch, Karl acts like they've never met), criticizing both them and the not-as-famous customers. Debuted October 9, 1993.

== Phillip the Hyper Hypo ==
A Mike Myers sketch. Myers played a hyperactive boy with hypoglycemia, hence the name. He would be leashed to a jungle gym at a playground while trading remarks with a girl nearby. The sketch ended both times with the girl offering him chocolate, giving him superhuman strength to the point he could break free, unbolting the jungle gym from the ground in the process. Philip would then be seen running, carrying the jungle gym in tow. Debuted November 20, 1993.

Appearances

Season	Episode	Host	Notes
19	November 20, 1993	Nicole Kidman	
19	February 12, 1994	Alec Baldwin, Kim Basinger	

== The Herlihy Boy ==
An Adam Sandler and Chris Farley sketch. Sandler played the Herlihy boy who sought extra work from his neighbors (such as house sitting), while Farley portrayed Mr. O'Malley who passionately recommended Herlihy's services. Throughout the sketch, it was noted that Sandler was struggling not to break character by laughing at Farley. Debuted December 4, 1993.

Appearances

Season	Episode	Host	Notes
19	December 4, 1993	Charlton Heston	House Sitting Service
19	January 8, 1994	Jason Patric	Dog Sitting Service
19	April 16, 1994	Emilio Estevez	Grandmother Sitting Service

== Stevie Siskin ==
A David Spade sketch. Debuted February 19, 1994.

== Total Bastard Airlines ==
A David Spade sketch. Spade and the week's host portrayed rude flight attendants who ushered customers off the plane with a curt "buh-bye". Helen Hunt portrayed a stewardess working with Spade when she was hosting in 1994. The phrase "buh bye" became a SNL-inspired catchphrase in the mid 1990s. Debuted March 19, 1994.

Appearances

Season	Episode	Host	Notes
19	March 19, 1994	Helen Hunt	
20	September 24, 1994	Steve Martin	

== Captain Jim & Pedro ==
A Tim Meadows and Adam Sandler sketch. It was in essence a cleaner version of Adam Sandler's "Buffoon" character that he did in his sketches. Tim Meadows played Captain Jim, a sea captain who was marooned on an island along with a sailor named Pedro, played by Adam Sandler. After 15 years, they managed to get themselves off the island and are trying to readjust to civilization. Captain Jim would often make well-thought out remarks, usually peppered with nautical terms, then Pedro would make a goofy remark such as "staring at the sun made us crazy". One episode had the pair making application to a job at Foot Locker, with the branch manager ready to give the sole opening to Pedro until the foolish remarks convince him Captain Jim would be the better man for the job. Another had the pair going on a double date with two sisters and trying to socialize with their father, only to have Pedro remark they made their way off the island by building a raft out of dead monkeys. This surprisingly wins over the father, who says any men who can make such a raft, that is seaworthy, can be trusted to do right by his daughters. A wraparound followed both segments, one spoofing CBS public service announcements which would follow CBS Specials saying that viewers should patronize their local library "to learn more about Saturday Night Live". Another showed people manning phones taking donations to preserve Saturday Night Live, in a spoof of PBS fundraisers, with Phil Hartman promising a "Captain Jim & Pedro" tote bag to anyone who pledged. Debuted April 9, 1994.

Preceded by Recurring Saturday Night Live characters and sketches introduced 1992–93	Recurring Saturday Night Live characters and sketches (listed chronologically)	Succeeded by Recurring Saturday Night Live characters and sketches introduced 1994–95
