= Recurring Saturday Night Live characters and sketches introduced 2015–16 =

The following is a list of recurring Saturday Night Live characters and sketches introduced during the forty-first season of SNL, which began on October 3, 2015.

== Young Girl Interrupting Porn Shoots ==
The shooting of a porn movie is regularly interrupted by a young girl (Aidy Bryant), seemingly unaware of the fictional aspect of the scene she has stumbled into.

| Season | Episode | Host | Notes |
|---|---|---|---|
| 41 | October 10, 2015 | Amy Schumer | The girl interrupts "Hot For Teacher 8" starring Schumer and Kyle Mooney because she needs help going over the day's lesson. |
| 41 | January 16, 2016 | Adam Driver | The girl interrupts "The Doctor is in... My Butt 4" starring Driver as Dr. Rockhard and Beck Bennett. |
| 43 | November 18, 2017 | Chance the Rapper | The girl interrupts "Skank Babysitter 17" starring Chance and Heidi Gardner thinking that a pizza delivery is real despite her already having eaten dinner. |

== Citizens Forum ==
An array of eccentric people monopolize the podium during the public comments segment of different public events such as a city council or school board meeting.

| Season | Episode | Host | Notes |
|---|---|---|---|
| 41 | October 10, 2015 | Amy Schumer | Bakersfield City Council meeting. |
| 41 | January 23, 2016 | Ronda Rousey | Again, citizens speak at a Bakersfield City Council meeting. |
| 47 | October 2, 2021 | Owen Wilson | Parents speak about COVID-19 safety policies at a school board meeting. |
| 47 | January 29, 2022 | Willem Dafoe | Tenants speak at an apartment building's tenant meeting. |

== Colleen Rafferty ==
Three people are being interrogated about a paranormal encounter or phenomenon they experienced. But Colleen Rafferty's (Kate McKinnon) recollection of the events vastly differs from the other two (one of which typically is the host), and is filled with unsavory details.

| Season | Episode | Host | Notes |
|---|---|---|---|
| 41 | December 5, 2015 | Ryan Gosling | Close Encounter, with Kate McKinnon, Gosling, Strong, Aidy Bryant, and Bobby Moynihan. |
| 41 | May 7, 2016 | Brie Larson | Near-Death Experience, with McKinnon, Larson, Strong, Bryant, and Moynihan. |
| 42 | December 17, 2016 | Casey Affleck | Christmas Miracle, with McKinnon, Affleck, Strong, Bryant, and Moynihan. |
| 43 | September 30, 2017 | Ryan Gosling | Another Close Encounter, with McKinnon, Gosling, Strong, Bryant, and Mikey Day. |
| 44 | November 10, 2018 | Liev Schreiber | Paranormal Occurrence, with McKinnon, Schreiber, Strong, Bryant, and Day. |
| 44 | May 18, 2019 | Paul Rudd | A Journey Through Time, with McKinnon, Rudd, Strong, Bryant, and Day. |
| 47 | May 21, 2022 | Natasha Lyonne | Final Encounter Cold Open, with McKinnon, Lyonne, Strong, Bryant, and Day. McKinnon's final episode as a cast member. |
| 49 | April 13, 2024 | Ryan Gosling | Close Encounter Cold Open, with McKinnon, Gosling, Sarah Sherman, Bowen Yang, and Day. |
| 50 | February 16, 2025 | 50th Anniversary Special | Close Encounter, with McKinnon, Pedro Pascal, Woody Harrelson, Meryl Streep, Bryant, and Jon Hamm. |

== Deenie, Somebody's Mom ==
Deenie (Kate McKinnon) inaccurately recaps her favorite shows on Weekend Update while eating from a plastic container.

| Season | Episode | Host | Notes |
|---|---|---|---|
| 41 | December 19, 2015 | Tina Fey, Amy Poehler | Deenie gives a year-end wrap-up of daytime soaps while she eats baked salmon. |
| 41 | April 9, 2016 | Russell Crowe | Deenie discusses The People v. O. J. Simpson with Colin Jost while eating brussels sprouts and imitation crab. |

== Undercover Boss ==
An Undercover Boss parody where Kylo Ren (Adam Driver) goes undercover as a low level employee to interact with his subordinates.

| Season | Episode | Host | Notes |
|---|---|---|---|
| 41 | January 16, 2016 | Adam Driver | Kylo Ren goes undercover as Matt, a radar technician. |
| 45 | January 25, 2020 | Adam Driver | Kylo Ren goes undercover as Randy, an entry level intern. |

== America's Funniest Pets ==
The presenter of an animal-based video clip show invites the two presenters of a French similar series, Joelle LaRue and Noelle LeSoup (Cecily Strong, Kate McKinnon). He asks them to cohost the show and provide silly voiceovers for the clips. But said voiceovers turn out to be more depressing than their American counterpart.

| Season | Episode | Host | Notes |
|---|---|---|---|
| 41 | January 16, 2016 | Adam Driver | Finn Raynal-Beads (Driver) presents America's Funniest Cats with LaRue and LeSoup. |
| 42 | October 22, 2016 | Tom Hanks | Ron Howard (Hanks) presents America's Funniest Pets with LaRue and LeSoup. |

== True Tales From The Sea ==
Adventurers down on their luck are rescued by beautiful mermaids, including Shud (Kate McKinnon), a part-woman, part-blobfish mermaid who doesn't exactly enchant the men she's trying to seduce.

| Season | Episode | Host | Notes |
|---|---|---|---|
| 41 | March 12, 2016 | Ariana Grande | Mermaids (Grande, Cecily Strong, McKinnon) of different aquatic species rescue three sailors (Beck Bennett, Taran Killam, and Bobby Moynihan) from a watery grave. Each mermaid needs to receive a kiss in order to become fully human. |
| 42 | March 11, 2017 | Scarlett Johansson | A World War 2 fighter pilot (Mikey Day) is shot down and falls into the sea but is rescued by Titacles (Beck Bennett) and must marry one of his mermaid daughters (Cecily Strong, Sasheer Zamata, McKinnon, Johansson). Cunk (Johansson) is 92% angler fish and grotesque like Shud. |

== Shanice Goodwin: Ninja ==
Despite her big stature and general clumsiness, Shanice Goodwin (Leslie Jones), cashier by day and ninja by night, is inexplicably a master of stealth.

| Season | Episode | Host | Notes |
|---|---|---|---|
| 41 | April 9, 2016 | Russell Crowe | Shanice rescues the ambassador's daughter (Vanessa Bayer) who has been kidnapped by the Russian mob (Crowe, Jon Rudnitsky, Kenan Thompson, Taran Killam). |
| 42 | March 11, 2017 | Scarlett Johansson | Sensei (Bobby Moynihan) has been kidnapped by the British mob (Mikey Day, Kyle Mooney, Beck Bennett, Alex Moffat, Kenan Thompson). Shanice joins her rival Dominika (Johansson) to rescue him. |

== Chad ==
Pete Davidson plays Chad, an apathetic, easily distracted youth with limited conversational skills whose catchphrase is "okay". He's the heartbreaker of several people decades older than him, but he couldn't care less about their grand declarations of love. In one instance, he is the obsession of a psychopathic serial killer, but Chad takes no notice of the killer's attempts to torment him.

| Season | Episode | Host | Notes |
|---|---|---|---|
| 41 | April 16, 2016 | Julia Louis-Dreyfus | Pool Boy |
| 42 | November 5, 2016 | Benedict Cumberbatch | Office Hours |
| 43 | October 7, 2017 | Gal Gadot | The Chosen One |
| 43 | December 2, 2017 | Saoirse Ronan | Bachelor Auction |
| 43 | January 20, 2018 | Jessica Chastain | Doctor's Orders |
| 44 | March 2, 2019 | John Mulaney | The Unknown Caller |
| 44 | May 4, 2019 | Adam Sandler | (Cut for Time) Chad's Journey |
| 45 | December 7, 2019 | Jennifer Lopez | Chad & JLo |
| 45 | February 8, 2020 | RuPaul | Chad & RuPaul |
| 46 | October 24, 2020 | Adele | Chad in a Haunted Mansion |
| 46 | May 8, 2021 | Elon Musk | Chad on Mars |
| 50 | February 16, 2025 | 50th Anniversary Special | The Stagehand |

== Suburban Mothers ==
A group of suburban mothers engage in cult-like behavior in trying to convert a newer, inexperienced mother into doing something that proved them of their motherhood.

| Season | Episode | Host | Notes |
|---|---|---|---|
| 41 | May 7, 2016 | Brie Larson | The moms convince a soon-to-be mother (Brie Larson) at her baby shower to get the "mom" haircut. As she realizes that she's transitioning to mom behaviors, the cut magically appears on her head. |
| 42 | May 13, 2017 | Melissa McCarthy | The moms explain to a new neighbor (Melissa Villaseñor) the ritual of choosing a "mom" animal to represent their entire personality. |

| Preceded by Recurring Saturday Night Live characters and sketches introduced 2014–15 | Recurring Saturday Night Live characters and sketches (listed chronologically) | Succeeded by Recurring Saturday Night Live characters and sketches introduced 2016–17 |
