= Recurring Saturday Night Live characters and sketches introduced 1984–85 =

The tenth season of Saturday Night Live ran from October 6, 1984, to April 13, 1985, and introduced several new recurring characters and sketches.

== Ed Grimley ==
Martin Short played a hyperactive nerd. Ed originally appeared as a recurring character in the Canadian series SCTV. Debuted on SNL October 6, 1984.

Appearances

Season	Episode	Host	Notes
10	October 6, 1984	none	
10	October 20, 1984	Jesse Jackson	
10	November 17, 1984	Ed Asner	
10	December 8, 1984	Ringo Starr	
10	February 2, 1985	Alex Karras	
10	April 13, 1985	Howard Cosell	
12	December 6, 1986	Chevy Chase, Steve Martin, Martin Short	
22	December 7, 1996	Martin Short	
41	November 7, 2015	Donald Trump	

== Rich Hall's Election Report ==
A Rich Hall sketch.

Appearances

Season	Episode	Host	Notes
10	October 6, 1984	none	
10	October 20, 1984	Jesse Jackson	
10	November 10, 1984	George Carlin	

== Lawrence Orbach ==
A Martin Short character, Lawrence was awkward and child-like. Lawrence also originally appeared in the Canadian series SCTV, as a contestant in the game show parody "Half-Wits". Debuted on SNL October 6, 1984.

== Lew Goldman ==
Goldman was a stereotypical elderly Jewish man played by Billy Crystal. He was prone to commenting on his disrespectful family while doing various commentaries. He also coughed and cleared his throat frequently, due to an apparent excess of phlegm. One of his most memorable insults was: "I have coughed up things that were more interesting than you!" Debuted October 13, 1984.

== Tippi Turtle ==
A Christopher Guest animated short. Debuted October 13, 1984.

Appearances

Season	Episode	Host	Notes
10	October 13, 1984	Bob Uecker	
10	October 20, 1984	Jesse Jackson	
10	November 17, 1984	Ed Asner	

== Willie and Frankie ("I hate when that happens") ==
A Billy Crystal and Christopher Guest sketch, also subject of a comedy song findable on Crystal's stand-up album Mahvelous!. Two good friends have meandering discussions in a variety of settings that inevitably drift into detailed anecdotes of grotesquely painful self-abuse. The men each complete the other's statements, correctly assuming increasingly outlandish scenarios. The characters periodically made some version of the remark "Don't ya hate it when that happens?" as though the pain they inflicted on themselves was a matter of bad luck. Debuted October 20, 1984.

Appearances

Season	Episode	Host	Notes
10	October 20, 1984	Jesse Jackson	
10	November 10, 1984	George Carlin	
10	December 8, 1984	Ringo Starr	
10	January 12, 1985	Kathleen Turner	
10	February 16, 1985	Pamela Sue Martin	
10	April 13, 1985	Howard Cosell	

== Buddy Young, Jr. ==
Buddy Young, Jr. was a Las Vegas lounge comedian played by Billy Crystal. This is a rare example of a little-known character spinning off into a feature film. Although Buddy Young, Jr. appeared only four times on SNL, he was the principal character in the 1992 film, Mr. Saturday Night. Debuted October 20, 1984.

== Fernando's Hideaway ==
Another Billy Crystal sketch that turned into a song and the most popular character of all Crystal's career. The series is a parody of Fernando Lamas, in this one Fernando, who would interview various celebrities, often confusing them with someone else (e.g. confusing actor Johnny Yune for football player Johnny Unitas). During each interview he would say, "You look mahvelous", and frequently the sketch would end with, "It's better to look good than to feel good." Debuted November 3, 1984.

Prior to the debut of Fernando's Hideaway, the character of "Fernando" appeared on SNL on March 17, 1984; May 5, 1984; and October 6, 1984, hosting "Weekend Update".

Appearances

Season	Episode	Host	Notes
10	November 3, 1984	Michael McKean	"Barry Manilow" (Bobby Fraraccio)
10	December 8, 1984	Ringo Starr	Ringo Starr & Barbara Bach
10	March 2, 1985	SNL Film Festival	Gene Siskel and Roger Ebert
10	March 30, 1985	Mr. T, Hulk Hogan	
10	April 13, 1985	Howard Cosell	

== The Joe Franklin Show ==
A parody of The Joe Franklin Show, with Billy Crystal impersonating host Joe Franklin. Debuted November 10, 1984.

Appearances

Season	Episode	Host	Notes
10	November 10, 1984	George Carlin	
10	January 12, 1985	Kathleen Turner	
10	February 16, 1985	Pamela Sue Martin	
10	March 30, 1985	Mr. T, Hulk Hogan	

== Jackie Rogers Jr. ==
A Martin Short character, previously seen on numerous episodes of SCTV. Debuted on SNL on November 10, 1984.

== Chi Chi & Consuela ==
A Mary Gross and Julia Louis-Dreyfus sketch. Debuted November 10, 1984.

Appearances

Season	Episode	Host	Notes
10	November 10, 1984	George Carlin	
10	December 1, 1984	Ed Begley Jr.	
10	January 19, 1985	Roy Scheider	

== Nathan Thurm ==
A shady lawyer, Thurm was a chain-smoker (often letting his cigarette burn to the point of becoming mostly ashes), quite paranoid, and constantly in denial about his paranoia. "I'm not being defensive. You're the one who's being defensive." When questioned, his response often included, "It's so funny to me that you would think..." He would break the fourth wall, looking into the camera and expressing his puzzlement at the questioner by asking, "Is it me, or is it him? It's him, right?" Other times, he would deny an accusation, then immediately reverse his position when the accuser reaffirmed the statement. "No, it isn't!" ("Yes it is.") "I know that! Why wouldn't I know that? I'm well aware of that!" Debuted November 17, 1984, and played by Martin Short.

Perhaps the best known appearance of Thurm was in a 1984 SNL sketch that was a send-up of 60 Minutes. Harry Shearer played Mike Wallace, accusing Thurm of being involved in corporate corruption. Thurm of course denied everything and nervously tried to turn the tables on Wallace.

Thurm was later reprised in 1990's The Earth Day Special and 2005's Earth to America, as well as on Martin Short's short-lived talk show in 1999–2000.

In his book I Must Say: My Life As A Humble Comedy Legend, Short revealed that the character was based on a makeup artist who worked at SNL.

Appearances

Season	Episode	Host	Notes
10	November 17, 1984	Ed Asner	
10	December 1, 1984	Ed Begley Jr.	Saturday Night News
10	February 2, 1985	Alex Karras	Saturday Night News
10	March 30, 1985	Mr. T, Hulk Hogan	
10	April 13, 1985	Howard Cosell	Saturday Night News

== Paul Harvey ==
Rich Hall impersonates Paul Harvey on Saturday Night News.

Appearances

Season	Episode	Host	Notes
10	November 17, 1984	Ed Asner	
10	December 15, 1984	Eddie Murphy	
10	January 19, 1985	Roy Scheider	
10	April 6, 1985	Christopher Reeve	

== Strictly From Blackwell ==
A Harry Shearer sketch. Debuted December 8, 1984.

== Ricky & Phil ==
A Billy Crystal and Christopher Guest sketch. Debuted January 19, 1985.

== That White Guy ==
A James Belushi sketch. Debuted February 2, 1985.

Appearances

Season	Episode	Host	Notes
10	February 2, 1985	Alex Karras	
10	February 16, 1985	Pamela Sue Martin	
10	April 13, 1985	Howard Cosell	That Russian Guy

== Robert Latta ==
A Rich Hall sketch based on a man who was caught trespassing at the White House in 1985. Debuted February 2, 1985.

Appearances

Season	Episode	Host	Notes
10	February 2, 1985	Alex Karras	Saturday Night News
10	February 9, 1985	Harry Anderson	
10	February 16, 1985	Pamela Sue Martin	
10	April 13, 1985	Howard Cosell	Saturday Night News

Preceded by Recurring Saturday Night Live characters and sketches introduced 1983-84	Recurring Saturday Night Live characters and sketches (listed chronologically)	Succeeded by Recurring Saturday Night Live characters and sketches introduced 1985-86
