= Recurring Saturday Night Live characters and sketches introduced 1998–99 =

The following is a list of recurring Saturday Night Live characters and sketches introduced between September 26, 1998, and May 15, 1999, the twenty-fourth season of SNL.

== Hello Dolly ==
An Ana Gasteyer sketch. Hello Dolly is a Home Shopping Network program hosted by Irish-American doll collector Deanna Nolan-Gray (Gasteyer). She interviews other doll enthusiasts, usually played by the guest host. The dolls displayed by the two for purchase are unusually inappropriate, such as "Jist Playin'", a boy doll playing with his mom's makeup and has lipstick over his face, and "Oopz", a girl doll in a full-body cast who is on a liquid diet. No matter how inappropriate the dolls get, the central joke is that Deanna and the guest both have serious personal problems (and therefore are likely hosting Hello Dolly to deal with them). Debuted October 3, 1998.

Season	Episode	Host	Notes
24	October 3, 1998	Kelsey Grammer	Grammer plays Don Simkin.
24	April 10, 1999	John Goodman	Goodman plays Gene Breck.
25	February 5, 2000	Alan Cumming	Cumming plays Derek DeLaMarquis.
26	February 17, 2001	Sean Hayes	Hayes plays Taylor St. LaRoi.
27	December 8, 2001	Hugh Jackman	Jackman plays Vincent Von Vance.

== The How Do You Say? Ah, Yes, Show ==
This sketch was furnished as a talk show featuring Chris Kattan as Antonio Banderas, the show's host. Kattan portrayed Banderas as a naïve chauvinist whose only objective was to seduce every female guest into sleeping with him, using his well-documented sex appeal and shaky-at-best mastery of the English language (as evidenced in the show's title). In the show, Banderas was always backed up by his three-man mariachi band, who aside from performing the musical duties on the show, constantly begged Banderas not to unbutton or remove his shirt, for it would be "too sexy". Jennifer Love Hewitt played a guest who was put off by his advances and questioned his amorous behavior by asking, "Aren't you married to Melanie Griffith?" His response was "Si. I am betrothed to her. She is, eh, how do you say? Ah, yes, old and not here." Drew Barrymore did appear in a sketch as Melanie Griffith. Debuted October 17, 1998.

Appearances:

- Season 24, Episode 3 (October 17, 1998): with Lucy Lawless as Sally Desk
- Season 24, Episode 7 (November 21, 1998): with Jennifer Love Hewitt as Gina Cutter
- Season 24, Episode 16 (March 20, 1999): with Drew Barrymore as Melanie Griffith
- Season 27, Episode 2 (October 6, 2001): host Seann William Scott

== Dog Show ==
Dog Show was an aptly titled parody of an Animal Planet show featuring people who are more than enamored with their dogs. It was hosted by Miss Colleen (Molly Shannon) and Mr. David Larry (Will Ferrell), a bizarre couple who were supposed to be married even though he was a homosexual ("Separate bedrooms, separate baths"). The two admit that they "don't like most people" but are extremely fond of dogs.

The sketch would open with David Larry banging on a snare drum, followed by the two hosts shouting "DOG SHOW!" The hosts would then introduce their dogs, "Mr. Rocky Balboa" and "Mr. Bojangles", (who was actually a female, but was given the title "Mr.", because as David Larry would point out, he is "playing a trick on her"), a pair of miniature dogs who were displayed dressed in costumes. Each sketch would introduce a guest to the "show", and often the hosts would have their dogs participate in things such as seances and weddings. Debuted December 5, 1998.

Appearances:

- Season 24, Episode 8 (December 5, 1998): with Vince Vaughn as William Alexander
- Season 24, Episode 11 (January 16, 1999): with James Van Der Beek as Gabriel Jacob
- Season 24, Episode 16 (March 29, 1999): with Drew Barrymore as Michael Troylo
- Season 25, Episode 2 (October 16, 1999): with Heather Graham as Lady Hamilton
- Season 25, Episode 11 (February 5, 2000): with Alan Cumming as Captain James Butternut
- Season 26, Episode 6 (November 18, 2000): with Tom Green as Gene Abernathy Reynolds

== Pimp Chat ==
Done only twice, this sketch featured Tracy Morgan as Bishop Don "Mack" Donald, a pastiche/parody/homage to Bishop Don "Magic" Juan. Both sketches featured Tim Meadows as "Pimpin' Kyle", Bishop Donald's sidekick, and took place in the back of a limo with pink faux fur upholstery, "from the back of a Rolls-Royce limousine parked outside Club Sugar Shack, at Nelson Ave. and Harlem." The first sketch featured Vince Vaughn (12/05/98) as "White Chocolate", and the second featured Ray Romano (3/13/99). As these were produced during the Clinton era, they invariably had content regarding said presidential scandals, with the occasional political questions thrown in. During these sketches, Bishop Donald would always call for the limo to slow down, at which point he would yell (to one of his prostitutes, presumably), "Bitch, where's my money?" Debuted December 5, 1998.

== Skeeter ==
Skeeter is a redneck character portrayed by Darrell Hammond. Skeeter uses his catchphrase "What's up, sons of bitches?" to start a conversation. He has a mullet hairstyle and his attire consists of a white undershirt, a blue button down shirt and an orange vest jacket. He sometimes wears a dirty purple and yellow hat.

In the Politics Today sketch, it is revealed that Skeeter is a high school dropout and has poor knowledge of politics and current events. In the Dirtball and Burnout Convention commercial, it is revealed that Skeeter is a "four time arrestee from TV's Cops."

Appearances:

- Season 24, Episode 10 (January 9, 1999): Extreme Hunting
- Season 28, Episode 18 (May 3, 2003): Politics Today
- Season 30, Episode 25 (January 15, 2005): Trucker Talk
- Season 30, Episode 14 (March 12, 2005): Dirtball and Burnout Convention

== Brian Fellow's Safari Planet ==
Brian Fellow's Safari Planet was a recurring sketch on Saturday Night Live, featuring Tracy Morgan. The character of Brian Fellow debuted on January 16, 1999--then a flamboyantly gay sports commentator with questionable credentials--alongside Colin Quinn on Weekend Update. The character's animal show setting premiered on May 15, 1999, and appeared 12 times, with his last appearance on October 17, 2015.

The sketch consists of Brian Fellow (Morgan), a young animal enthusiast who hosts his own animal show. However, as the opening narration of every sketch except the first (which goes into detail about how he works for an animal refuge in Thailand), he is neither a licensed zoologist, nor does he have any degrees in any environmental sciences, and only has a sixth-grade education. Brian interviews representatives from zoos, animal sanctuaries, or other wildlife centers, who bring animals to his show, usually about two per sketch. The simple-minded Brian would either ask questions or make remarks that were completely irrelevant, or would take his guest's observations or comments out of context and become offended, causing most, if not all of his interviews to humorously fall apart. Most of them would end with Brian either throwing the guest and his or her animal out, or them walking out in frustration. Sometimes, during a second interview, Brian would actually ask an intelligent, relevant question about the animal, but would then imagine the visiting animal from the previous interview, becoming anthropomorphic (via puppetry or animation), and doing something humorous, or would speak to him/threaten him in some way, and Brian would become too distracted to continue the interview.

The first animal sketch accredited Brian Fellow with false credentials and fake experience in zoology fields, which became quickly obvious. The subsequent sketches discontinued that concept.

Appearances:

- Season 24, Episode 11 (January 16, 1999) on Weekend Update
- Season 24, Episode 19 (May 15, 1999): with Sarah Michelle Gellar as Karen Nathan
- Season 26, Episode 12 (February 17, 2001): with Sean Hayes as Pat Ensis
- Season 27, Episode 6 (November 17, 2001): host Billy Bob Thornton
- Season 27, Episode 12 (February 2, 2002): with Britney Spears as Gabby Connors
- Season 27, Episode 17 (April 13, 2002): with The Rock as Denny McClain
- Season 28, Episode 1 (October 5, 2002): with Matt Damon as Sean Kelly
- Season 28, Episode 9 (January 11, 2003): with Jeff Gordon as Robert Forgy
- Season 28, Episode 19 (May 10, 2003): with Adrien Brody as Sean Buckley
- Season 29, Episode 7 (December 6, 2003): with Al Sharpton as Ryan Rellow
- Season 29, Episode 17 (April 10, 2004): with Janet Jackson as Natalie Logan
- Season 34, Episode 18 (March 14, 2009): host Tracy Morgan
- Season 41, Episode 3 (October 17, 2015): host Tracy Morgan

== 7 Degrees Celsius ==
7 Degrees Celsius is a musical group that is a parody of late-1990s boy bands, such as Backstreet Boys and *NSYNC. Their name is a play on the boy band 98 Degrees. Just like the aforementioned boy bands, 7 Degrees Celsius has members of distinct personality types. Wade (Jimmy Fallon) is the baby-faced "cute one", Samm (Chris Kattan) is a bad-boy type, Jeph (Chris Parnell) is the one with a crazy hairstyle, and Sweet T (Horatio Sanz) is the older one who, despite the obvious age difference, claims to be as young as his bandmates. Sweet T has a 15-year-old son named Ribeye, though he adds that this doesn't make him an old dude, since he had him when he was 9. The host or musical guest would appear as the fifth member (similar to Gemini's Twin). Jeph describes the group's sound as "gangsta rap meets hip-hop meets You Can't Do That On Television." The group's manager is a man with a thinly veiled criminal past named Peter Tanner, played by Will Ferrell. In one sketch, the band is seen bouncing around on large inflatable playground balls while singing, a reference to the Backstreet Boys' trademark "folding chair dance".

Appearances:

- Season 24, Episode 11 (January 16, 1999): with James Van Der Beek as Ric
- Season 25, Episode 10 (January 15, 2000): with Freddie Prinze Jr. as P. Nutt
- Season 25, Episode 14 (March 11, 2000): with Joshua Jackson as crazed fan, *NSYNC as No Refund

Preceded by Recurring Saturday Night Live characters and sketches introduced 1997–98	Recurring Saturday Night Live characters and sketches (listed chronologically)	Succeeded by Recurring Saturday Night Live characters and sketches introduced 1999–2000
