= List of recurring Saturday Night Live characters and sketches =

The following is a list of recurring Saturday Night Live sketches, organized by the season and date in which the sketch first appeared.

== 1975–1976 ==
Title	Premiere date	Main actor(s)	Description
Weekend Update	October 11, 1975	Chevy Chase; Jane Curtin; Dan Aykroyd	A satirical news segment starring that is the longest-running recurring sketch in the show's history. Like the show itself, it has seen many changes over the years and has a revolving door of anchors, including Chevy Chase, Jane Curtin, Dan Aykroyd, Bill Murray, Charles Rocket, Gail Matthius, Brian Doyle-Murray, Mary Gross, Christine Ebersole, Brad Hall, Christopher Guest, Dennis Miller, Kevin Nealon, Norm Macdonald, Colin Quinn, Jimmy Fallon, Tina Fey, Amy Poehler, Horatio Sanz, Seth Meyers, Cecily Strong, Colin Jost, and Michael Che.
The Killer Bees	October 11, 1975		First characters to recur on SNL. According to a Lorne Michaels interview for the book Live from New York, "The only note we got from the network on the first show was 'Cut the bees.' And so I made sure I put them in the next show." The bees were played by all the repertory players at the time, who wore yellow and black horizontal stripes, wings, and springy antennas. Much of the humor from these scenes came out of puns or metaphors that had to do with well-known activities and body parts of bees. The bees were a staple of the first season, appearing 11 times. However, the cast and crew quickly became tired of them, and the bees only appeared three more times during the original cast's five-year tenure.
The Land of Gorch	October 11, 1975	Jim Henson; Alice Tweedie; Jerry Nelson; Fran Brill; Richard Hunt; Frank Oz	Puppet sketch starring Jim Henson's Muppets, King Ploobis (performed by Jim Henson), Queen Peuta (performed by Alice Tweedie), Scred (performed by Jerry Nelson), Vazh (performed by Fran Brill), Wisss (performed by Richard Hunt), and the Mighty Favog (performed by Frank Oz). Lorne Michaels described the characters as the type of Muppets that can stay up late.
Land Shark	November 8, 1975	Chevy Chase	Chevy Chase plays a shark attempting to lure his way into a victim's home.
Sherry	November 15, 1975	Laraine Newman	Laraine Newman plays Sherry, a stereotypical naive valley girl. Newman reprised the role in the 40th anniversary special as part of The Californians sketch in 2015, in which she played Karina's mother who, like Sherry, also spoke valley girl-esque.
Minute Mystery with Mike Mendoza	November 15, 1975	Dan Aykroyd	Dan Aykroyd is a crime scene photographer who gives the audience a list of clues and 60 seconds to solve a mystery.
Looks at Books	November 15, 1975	Jane Curtin	A talk show sketch hosted by Jane Curtin interviewing profound authors.
Emily Litella	December 13, 1975	Gilda Radner	Emily Litella was an elderly woman with a hearing problem who frequently ranted about topics about which she had misread or misheard, such as "Violins on Television," "Canker Research," "Endangered Feces," or "Presidential Erections" (to satisfy the censors at the time, Litella was made to explicitly state that she was referring to erecting statues of presidents). Her catchphrase was "Never mind!", said after she was informed of her mistake.
Saturday Night Live Samurai	December 13, 1975	John Belushi	John Belushi plays a samurai warrior, who speaks only (mock) Japanese, and wields a katana. He is seen in various occupations ranging from a hotel desk clerk to a tailor.
Mel's Char Palace	December 20, 1975	Dan Aykroyd	A steakhouse commercial parody featuring Dan Aykroyd. At Mel's, customers are given a chainsaw and are invited to hunt, stun, cut and cook their own cow.
Steve Bushakis	January 24, 1976	John Belushi	A John Belushi character who hails from Chicago, named after Belushi's childhood friend.
H & L Brock	January 31, 1976	John Belushi	As Lowell Brock, John Belushi gives reasons why he should do your taxes., "He'll take the time . . because he has the time . . because he's doing time."
Mr. Bill	February 28, 1976		Mr. Bill is the clay figurine star of a parody of children's shows. Mr. Bill got its start when Walter Williams sent SNL a Super 8 reel featuring the character in response to the show's request for home movies during the first season. Mr. Bill's first appearance was on the February 28, 1976, episode. Williams became a full-time writer for the show in 1978, writing more than 20 sketches based on Mr. Bill. Each Mr. Bill episode started innocently, but quickly turned dangerous for Mr. Bill. Along with his dog, Spot, he suffered various indignities inflicted by "Mr. Hands," a man seen only as a pair of hands (played by Vance DeGeneres). The character's popularity spawned the 1986 live-action movie Mr. Bill's Real Life Adventures.
Tomorrow	April 17, 1976	Dan Aykroyd	A parody of The Tomorrow Show, starring Dan Aykroyd as Tom Snyder.
Baba Wawa	April 24, 1976	Gilda Radner	Gilda Radner impersonates journalist Barbara Walters.
Colleen Fernman	April 24, 1976	Gilda Radner	Appearing in seven sketches over five seasons, Colleen is usually non-talkative, and appears to be spaced out or in a vegetative state, and it is established in a February 24, 1979, sketch about psychiatrists that she is autistic.
Bobbi Farber	July 31, 1976	Gilda Radner	Middle-class Jewish-American with a nasal voice, who appeared in eight sketches in various settings over five seasons.

== 1976–1977 ==
Title	Premiere date	Host(s)	Description
Mr. Mike's Least-Loved Bedtime Tales	October 30, 1976	Michael O'Donoghue	O'Donoghue as his shock alter-ego Mr.Mike would tell children's bedtime stories with increasingly horrific, nightmarish twists. Appearances from Buck Henry, Dick Cavett, Jodie Foster, Senator Julian Bond and Buck Henry with Miskel Spillman. Stories: The Little Train that Died, The Blind Chicken, The Enchanted Thermos and The Rabbit. Also the segment exists in different variations, such as Mr Mike's Least Loved Music or in the sketch where Mr. Mike meets Uncle Remus from the movie Song of the South.
Consumer Probe	December 11, 1976	Dan Aykroyd, Jane Curtin, Candice Bergen	In each appearance, the moderator of the show would interrogate toy maker Irwin Mainway, played by Dan Aykroyd, while he defended his company's extremely dangerous products aimed at children, such as "Bag O' Glass" (with Mainway also acknowledging other products in its line, such as "Bag O' Vipers" and "Bag O' Sulfuric Acid"), "Teddy Chainsaw Bear" (a teddy bear with a working chainsaw in its chest), "Johnny Switchblade Adventure Punk" (an action figure with real retractable switchblades), and Halloween costumes such as the "Johnny Combat Action Costume" (which includes a working rifle, and is allegedly popular in Detroit and Texas), "Invisible Pedestrian" (a black, non-reflective uniform), "Johnny Space Commander Mask" (an airtight plastic bag affixed over the head with a rubber band), and "Johnny Human Torch" (an oil-soaked costume that comes with an oversized lighter). The first host of "Consumer Probe" was Candice Bergen (her character had no name), and then in four subsequent episodes, "Consumer Probe" (twice entitled "On The Spot") was hosted by Joan Face. The sketch was named the 8th best sketch in “The 50 Best Sketches of All Time” by nerve.com, the third highest ranking sketch on Saturday Night Live after “Coneheads at Home” and “Samurai Hotel”.
Coneheads	January 15, 1977	Dan Aykroyd, Jane Curtin, Laraine Newman	a family of aliens stranded on Earth. Appearances from Ralph Nader, Steve Martin, Jack Burns, Elliott Gould, Buck Henry, Charles Grodin, Steve Martin, Jill Clayburgh, Richard Dreyfuss, Frank Zappa, Kate Jackson
E. Buzz Miller and Christie Christina	January 22, 1977	Dan Aykroyd, Laraine Newman	Sleazy public-access television cable TV host E. Buzz Miller (Dan Aykroyd) made crude and lascivious remarks about otherwise commonplace subjects (such as fine art or exercise) to which his ditzy co-host Miss Christie Christina (Laraine Newman) would giggle and make obtuse responses. Christie appeared once outside the cable TV show, in the Season 5, Episode 15 sketch "Assertiveness Training".
Rhonda Weiss	January 29, 1977	Gilda Radner	A Gilda Radner character from Long Island, coined as the "Jewish-American Princess"
Leonard Pinth-Garnell	March 12, 1977	Dan Aykroyd	a recurring character. Pinth-Garnell, always clad in a tuxedo and black tie, would lugubriously introduce a short performance of "Bad Conceptual Theater", "Bad Playhouse", "Bad Cinema", "Bad Opera", "Bad Ballet", "Bad Red Chinese Ballet", or "Bad Cabaret for Children", and then exult in its sheer awfulness. Aykroyd played the character nine times from 1977 through 1979, and returned for a single appearance on November 3, 2001, introducing "Bad Conceptual Theater." (The show was hosted at least one time by Laraine Newman as Lady Pinth-Garnell.) Pinth-Garnell was loosely based on the longtime PBS Masterpiece Theatre host Alistair Cooke. Memorable quotations: "Stunningly bad!", "Monumentally ill-advised!", "Perfectly awful!", "Couldn't be worse!", "Exquisitely awful!", "Astonishingly ill-chosen!", "Really bit the big one!", "Unrelentingly bad!", "Rally socks!", "There ... That wasn't so good now, was it?". Appearances: Sissy Spacek, Julian Bond, Shelley Duvall, Madeline Kahn, Mary Kay Place, Jill Clayburgh, Buck Henry, Carrie Fisher, Kate Jackson, Teri Garr, John Goodman
Colleen Fernman	April 9, 1977	Gilda Radner	
Nick the Lounge Singer	April 16, 1977	Bill Murray	one of Bill Murray's most popular recurring characters during his tenure on SNL. The character was a typical 1970s lounge singer who sang current songs in a drawn-out, schmaltzy manner, and was typically accompanied by Paul Shaffer on piano. Nick always had a different 'seasonal' last name (i.e. Nick Summers, Nick Springs, etc.) or sometimes a surname more specific to the sketch (for instance, if he were performing at a prison, he would be "Nick Slammer") and, although he would perform at such unfortunate gigs as airport bars and dives, he would always sing his heart out. He would often take the popular songs of the time and change some of the lyrics to suit the occasion or the setting. In between songs, Nick would schmooze and joke with the audience, chiding them in a harmless showbiz fashion. In one episode, he spotted Linda Ronstadt (that episode's musical guest) in the audience and proceeded to sing a very uncomfortable and unamused Ronstadt a medley of her hits until her bodyguard (played by John Belushi) finally punches him. In probably his most famous appearance, he sang the theme from Star Wars, adding his own lyrics ("Star Wars/Nothing but Star Wars/Give me those Star Wars/Don't let them end!") to the famous John Williams piece. Nearly two decades after Nick debuted on SNL, a recurring skit called The Culp Family Musical Performances featuring Will Ferrell and Ana Gasteyer would gain popularity using the same basic format.
Debbie Doody	April 16, 1977	Gilda Radner	Doody is the widow of Howdy Doody, complete with strings attached to her arms
Shower Mike with Richard Herkiman	May 21, 1977	Bill Murray	Herkiman, who at first appears to be taking his routine morning shower and imagining he is hosting a TV talk show. It soon becomes apparent that the TV program is real, as his TV "guests" enter the shower with him fully clothed.

== 1977–1978 ==
- The Festrunk Brothers (Wild and Crazy Guys) (Dan Aykroyd, Steve Martin) – September 24, 1977
- The Franken and Davis Show (Al Franken, Tom Davis) – September 24, 1977
- The Ex-Police (Dan Aykroyd, Bill Murray) – October 15, 1977
- Judy Miller (Gilda Radner) – October 29, 1977
- Roseanne Roseannadanna (Gilda Radner) – January 21, 1978
- Olympia Cafe (Cheeseburger, Cheeseburger) (John Belushi, Dan Aykroyd, Laraine Newman, Bill Murray) – January 28, 1978
- The Nerds (Lisa Loopner) (Gilda Radner, featuring Bill Murray as Todd, and Jane Curtin as Mrs. Loopner) – January 28, 1978
- Lester Crackfield (Al Franken) – February 18, 1978
- Point/Counterpoint (Jane Curtin, Dan Aykroyd) – March 25, 1978
- The Blues Brothers (Dan Aykroyd, John Belushi) – April 22, 1978
- Father Guido Sarducci (Don Novello) – May 13, 1978

== 1978–1979 ==
- Honker the Homeless Man (Bill Murray) – October 14, 1978
- The Mall (Scotch Boutique, D&R Men's Stylists, Barry White's Big and Tall, etc.) – October 14, 1978
- Woman to Woman (Gilda Radner) – October 21, 1978
- Uncle Roy (Buck Henry) – November 11, 1978
- St. Mickey's Knights Of Columbus – November 11, 1978
- Chico Escuela (Garrett Morris) – November 11, 1978
- Telepsychic (Dan Aykroyd) – December 9, 1978
- Candy Slice (Gilda Radner) – December 9, 1978
- The Widettes (Jane Curtin, Dan Aykroyd, John Belushi, Gilda Radner) – December 16, 1978
- Miles Cowperthwaite (Michael Palin) – January 27, 1979
- Dick Lanky (Bill Murray) – February 17, 1979
- Rosa Santangelo (Gilda Radner) – May 19, 1979

== 1979–1980 ==
- Tom Clay (Harry Shearer) – October 20, 1979
- The Bel-Airabs (Don Novello, Bill Murray, Jane Curtin, Gilda Radner, Laraine Newman) – December 8, 1979
- Big Vic Ricker (Harry Shearer) – January 26, 1980
- Iris De Flaminio (Jane Curtin) – April 5, 1980

== 1980–1981 ==
- Vickie & Debbie (Gail Matthius, Denny Dillon) – November 15, 1980
- What's It All About (Gilbert Gottfried, Denny Dillon) – November 15, 1980
- Paulie Herman (Joe Piscopo) – December 6, 1980
- Raheem Abdul Muhammed (Eddie Murphy) – December 6, 1980
- Mary Louise (Denny Dillon) – December 6, 1980
- Nadine and Rowena (Denny Dillon, Gail Matthius) – December 13, 1980
- The Livelys (Charles Rocket, Gail Matthius) – January 17, 1981
- Mister Robinson's Neighborhood (Eddie Murphy) – February 21, 1981
- I Married A Monkey (Tim Kazurinsky) – April 11, 1981
- Frank & Papa (Tim Kazurinsky, Tony Rosato) – April 11, 1981

== 1981–1982 ==
- A Few Minutes with Andy Rooney (Joe Piscopo) – October 3, 1981
- Tyrone Green, Prose and Cons (Eddie Murphy) – October 3, 1981
- The Bizzaro World (Tim Kazurinsky, Mary Gross, Christine Ebersole, Robin Duke, Joe Piscopo, Tony Rosato) – October 10, 1981
- Buckwheat (Eddie Murphy) – October 10, 1981
- Paulette Clooney (Robin Duke) – October 10, 1981
- Velvet Jones (Eddie Murphy) – October 17, 1981
- Vic Salukin (Tony Rosato) – October 31, 1981
- Pudge & Solomon (Joe Piscopo, Eddie Murphy) – January 30, 1982
- Dr. Jack Badofsky (Tim Kazurinsky) – March 20, 1982
- Gumby (Eddie Murphy) – March 27, 1982
- The Whiners (Joe Piscopo, Robin Duke) – April 10, 1982

== 1982–1983 ==
- April May June (Julia Louis-Dreyfus) – September 25, 1982
- Mrs. T. (Robin Duke) – October 2, 1982
- Marvin & Celeste (Tim Kazurinsky, Mary Gross) – October 2, 1982
- Alfalfa (Mary Gross) – November 13, 1982
- Havnagootiim Vishnuuerheer (Tim Kazurinsky) – December 4, 1982
- Siobhan Cahill (Mary Gross) – January 22, 1983
- Dr. Ruth Westheimer (Mary Gross) – January 29, 1983
- Dion's Hairstyling (Eddie Murphy, Joe Piscopo) – February 19, 1983
- Patti Lynn Hunnsacker (Julia Louis-Dreyfus) – February 5, 1983

== 1983–1984 ==
- Dwight MacNamara (Gary Kroeger) – November 12, 1983
- Hello, Trudy! (James Belushi, Julia Louis-Dreyfus) – December 10, 1983
- El Dorko (Gary Kroeger) – January 28, 1984
- Worthington Clotman (Tim Kazurinsky) – January 28, 1984
- Wayne Huevos (Tim Kazurinsky) – February 18, 1984

== 1984–1985 ==
- Ed Grimley (Martin Short) – October 6, 1984
- Rich Hall's Election Report (Rich Hall) – October 6, 1984
- Lawrence Orback (Martin Short) – October 6, 1984
- Lew Goldman (Billy Crystal) – October 13, 1984
- Tippi Turtle (Christopher Guest) – October 13, 1984
- Willie & Frankie ("Don't ya hate it when...?") (Billy Crystal, Christopher Guest) – October 20, 1984
- Buddy Young, Jr. (Billy Crystal) – October 20, 1984
- Fernando's Hideaway (Billy Crystal) – November 3, 1984
- The Joe Franklin Show (Billy Crystal) – November 10, 1984
- Jackie Rogers Jr. (Martin Short) – November 10, 1984
- Chi Chi & Consuela (Mary Gross, Julia Louis-Dreyfus) – November 10, 1984
- Nathan Thurm (Martin Short) – November 17, 1984
- Paul Harvey (Rich Hall) – November 17, 1984
- Harry Shearer (Christopher Guest) – December 8, 1984
- Ricky & Phil (Billy Crystal, Christopher Guest) – January 19, 1985
- That White Guy (James Belushi) – February 2, 1985
- Robert Latta (Rich Hall) – February 2, 1985

== 1985–1986 ==
- Cabrini Green Jackson (Danitra Vance) – November 9, 1985
- The Jones Brothers (Damon Wayans, Anthony Michael Hall) – November 9, 1985
- The Limits of the Imagination (Randy Quaid) – November 9, 1985
- The Pat Stevens Show (Nora Dunn) – November 16, 1985
- Craig Sundberg, Idiot Savant (Anthony Michael Hall) – November 16, 1985
- Tommy Flanagan, the Pathological Liar (Jon Lovitz) – November 16, 1985
- Master Thespian (Jon Lovitz) – December 7, 1985
- The Rudy Randolphs (Randy Quaid, Robert Downey Jr.) – December 7, 1985
- The Stand-Ups (Tom Hanks, Jon Lovitz, Damon Wayans, Dennis Miller) – December 14, 1985
- That Black Girl (Danitra Vance) – January 18, 1986
- Vinnie Barber (Jon Lovitz) – January 18, 1986
- Mephistopheles (Jon Lovitz) – January 25, 1986
- The Big Picture (A. Whitney Brown) – February 8, 1986
- Babette (Nora Dunn) – February 15, 1986
- The Further Adventures of Biff and Salena (Jon Lovitz, Joan Cusack) – February 22, 1986
- Actors of Film (Nora Dunn, Robert Downey Jr.) – March 22, 1986

== 1986–1987 ==
- Lane Maxwell (Dana Carvey) – October 11, 1986
- Marge Keister (Jan Hooks) – October 11, 1986
- The Church Lady (Dana Carvey) – October 11, 1986
- Mr. Subliminal (Kevin Nealon) – October 11, 1986
- Derek Stevens ("She choppin' broccoli...") (Dana Carvey) – October 11, 1986
- The Sweeney Sisters (Jan Hooks, Nora Dunn, Marc Shaiman) – October 18, 1986
- Instant Coffee with Bill Smith (Kevin Nealon) – October 18, 1986
- The Two Sammies (Dana Carvey, Kevin Nealon) – November 8, 1986
- Miss Connie's Fable Nook (Jan Hooks, Dana Carvey, Dennis Miller, Kevin Nealon) – November 8, 1986
- Chick Hazzard/Eddie Spimozo (Phil Hartman, Jon Lovitz) – November 15, 1986
- Ching Chang (Dana Carvey) – November 15, 1986
- The NFL Today (Phil Hartman, Kevin Nealon) – January 24, 1987
- Mace (Phil Hartman) – January 24, 1987
- Nightline (Dana Carvey) – February 14, 1987
- Discover (Phil Hartman) – February 28, 1987
- President Dexter (Charlton Heston) – March 28, 1987

== 1987–1988 ==
- Pumping Up with Hans & Franz (Dana Carvey, Kevin Nealon) – October 17, 1987
- Dennis Miller (Dana Carvey) – December 19, 1987
- Tonto, Tarzan & Frankenstein's Monster (Jon Lovitz, Kevin Nealon, Phil Hartman) – December 19, 1987
- Learning To Feel (Nora Dunn) – January 23, 1988
- Girl Watchers (Tom Hanks, Jon Lovitz) – February 20, 1988

== 1988–1989 ==
- Mr. Short-Term Memory (Tom Hanks) – October 8, 1988
- Celebrity Restaurant (Dana Carvey) – December 3, 1988
- Plug Away (Jon Lovitz) – December 10, 1988
- Tony Trailer (Kevin Nealon) – January 21, 1989
- Stuart Rankin, All Things Scottish (Mike Myers) – January 28, 1989
- Grumpy Old Man (Dana Carvey) – February 11, 1989
- Wayne's World (Dana Carvey, Mike Myers) – February 18, 1989
- Cooking with the Anal Retentive Chef (Phil Hartman) – April 1, 1989
- Tales Of Ribaldry (Jon Lovitz) – April 1, 1989
- Sprockets (Mike Myers) – April 15, 1989
- Lothar of the Hill People (Mike Myers, Phil Hartman, Jon Lovitz) – April 15, 1989
- Toonces, The Driving Cat (Dana Carvey, Victoria Jackson) – May 20, 1989

== 1989–1990 ==
- Lank Thompson (Mike Myers) – October 21, 1989
- The Tonight Show (Dana Carvey) – October 28, 1989
- Lyle the Effeminate Heterosexual (Dana Carvey) – November 11, 1989
- Annoying Man (Jon Lovitz) – November 11, 1989
- Singing Cowboys (Dana Carvey, Phil Hartman) – November 11, 1989
- Hanukkah Harry (Jon Lovitz) – December 16, 1989
- The Continental (Christopher Walken) – January 20, 1990
- Middle-Aged Man (Mike Myers)– April 21, 1990

== 1990–1991 ==
- Larry Roman the Talent Scout (Dana Carvey) – September 29, 1990
- Simon (Mike Myers) – November 10, 1990
- The Dark Side with Nat X (Chris Rock, Chris Farley) – November 10, 1990
- The Doormen (Rob Schneider, Kevin Nealon) – November 10, 1990
- Pat (Julia Sweeney) – December 1, 1990
- Uri (Sabra) (Tom Hanks) – December 8, 1990
- Bill Swerski's Superfans (Joe Mantegna, George Wendt, Robert Smigel, Mike Myers, Chris Farley) – January 12, 1991
- I'm Chillin' (Chris Rock, Chris Farley) – January 12, 1991
- Deep Thoughts (Jack Handey) – January 19, 1991
- The Elevator Fans (Dana Carvey, Kevin Nealon) – January 19, 1991
- The Richmeister (Copy Room Guy) (Rob Schneider) – January 19, 1991
- Coffee Talk with Linda Richman (Mike Myers) – January 19, 1991
- Daily Affirmation with Stuart Smalley (Al Franken) – February 9, 1991
- Frank Gannon, P.I. P.I. (Kevin Nealon) – April 13, 1991

== 1991–1992 ==
- Tales From The Barbecue (Tim Meadows, Chris Rock) – September 28, 1991
- Zoraida the NBC Page (Ellen Cleghorne) – September 28, 1991
- The Chris Farley Show (Chris Farley) – October 4, 1991
- Queen Shenequa (Ellen Cleghorne) – October 26, 1991
- Mark Strobel (Chris Farley) – November 2, 1991
- Unfrozen Caveman Lawyer (Phil Hartman) – November 23, 1991
- Dick Clark's Receptionist (David Spade) – December 7, 1991
- Theatre Stories (Mike Myers, Julia Sweeney, Dana Carvey) – December 14, 1991
- Jan Brady (Melanie Hutsell) – January 11, 1992
- Delta Delta Delta (Melanie Hutsell, Siobhan Fallon Hogan, Beth Cahill) – January 11, 1992
- Cajun Man (Adam Sandler) – February 8, 1992
- The Sensitive Naked Man (Rob Schneider) – February 8, 1992
- Buster Jenkins (Chris Rock) – February 15, 1992
- Susan the Transsexual (Phil Hartman) – February 15, 1992
- Opera Man (Adam Sandler) – April 18, 1992

== 1992–1993 ==
- Tiny Elvis (Nicolas Cage/Rob Schneider) – September 26, 1992
- Larry King Live (Kevin Nealon) – October 3, 1992
- Hollywood Minute (David Spade) – October 3, 1992
- Audience McGee (Adam Sandler) – October 24, 1992
- Hank Fielding (Robert Smigel) – November 14, 1992
- Tony Vallencourt (Adam Sandler) – December 12, 1992
- Orgasm Guy (Rob Schneider) – December 12, 1992
- Gap Girls (Adam Sandler, David Spade, Chris Farley) – January 9, 1993
- Sassy's Sassiest Boys (Phil Hartman) – February 6, 1993
- Canteen Boy (Adam Sandler) – March 13, 1993
- Hub's Gyros ("You like-a the juice?") (Rob Schneider, Robert Smigel, Chris Farley, Adam Sandler) – April 10, 1993
- Bennett Brauer (Chris Farley) – April 10, 1993
- Matt Foley (Chris Farley) – May 8, 1993

== 1993–1994 ==
- Milton (Office Space) – September 25, 1993
- Out Of Africa ("You put your weed in there!") (Rob Schneider) – September 25, 1993
- The Denise Show (Adam Sandler) – October 2, 1993
- Ike Turner (Tim Meadows) – October 2, 1993
- Christopher Walken's Psychic Network (Jay Mohr) – October 9, 1993
- Karl's Video (David Spade) – October 9, 1993
- Phillip the Hyper Hypo (Mike Myers) – November 20, 1993
- The Herlihy Boy (Adam Sandler, Chris Farley) – December 4, 1993
- Stevie Siskin (David Spade) – February 19, 1994
- Total Bastard Airlines (David Spade) – March 19, 1994
- Captain Jim & Pedro (Tim Meadows, Adam Sandler) – April 9, 1994

== 1994–1995 ==
- Gil Graham (Adam Sandler) – September 24, 1994
- Religious Cult (Adam Sandler, David Spade) – October 15, 1994
- Good Morning Brooklyn (Jay Mohr) – November 12, 1994
- Scottish Soccer Hooligan Weekly (Mike Myers, Mark McKinney) – January 21, 1995
- Perspectives with Lionel Osbourne (Tim Meadows) – January 21, 1995
- Zagat's (Chris Farley, Adam Sandler) – February 25, 1995
- Mighty Mack Blues (John Goodman) – March 25, 1995
- Melanie the Babysitter (Mark McKinney) – April 15, 1995

== 1995–1996 ==
- Get Off The Shed! (Will Ferrell, David Koechner, Nancy Walls) – September 30, 1995
- Leg Up (Molly Shannon, Cheri Oteri) – September 30, 1995
- Nightline (Darrell Hammond) – September 30, 1995
- Spade in America (David Spade) – September 30, 1995
- Mickey the Dyke (Cheri Oteri) – September 30, 1995
- Rita DelVecchio (Cheri Oteri) – October 21, 1995
- Mary Katherine Gallagher (Molly Shannon) – October 28, 1995
- The Spartan Cheerleaders (Will Ferrell, Cheri Oteri) – November 11, 1995
- Stan Hooper (Norm Macdonald) – November 11, 1995
- The British Fops (Mark McKinney, David Koechner) – November 11, 1995
- Joe Blow (Colin Quinn) – November 18, 1995
- Gary Macdonald (David Koechner) – December 2, 1995
- The Joe Pesci Show (Jim Breuer) – December 2, 1995
- G-Dog (Tim Meadows) – December 2, 1995
- Lenny the Lion (Colin Quinn) – December 9, 1995
- The Rocky Roads (Will Ferrell, Tim Meadows, David Alan Grier) – December 9, 1995
- Gerald "T-Bones" Tibbons (David Koechner) – January 13, 1996
- Bill Brasky (Will Ferrell, David Koechner, Mark McKinney, Tim Meadows) – January 20, 1996
- Kevin Franklin (Tim Meadows) – February 10, 1996
- Suel Forrester (Chris Kattan) – March 16, 1996
- The Roxbury Guys (Will Ferrell, Chris Kattan) – March 23, 1996
- Bobby Coultsman (Phil Hartman) – March 23, 1996
- Goat Boy (Jim Breuer) – May 11, 1996
- Rolf (Colin Quinn) – May 11, 1996

== 1996–1997 ==
- The Ambiguously Gay Duo (a cartoon by Robert Smigel) – September 28, 1996
- Mr. Peepers (Chris Kattan) – September 28, 1996
- Kincaid (Ana Gasteyer) – September 28, 1996
- Gene, the Ex-Convict (Colin Quinn) – October 5, 1996
- Harry Caray (Will Ferrell) – October 19, 1996
- The Quiet Storm (Tim Meadows) – October 19, 1996
- The Culps (Ana Gasteyer, Will Ferrell) – November 2, 1996
- The Delicious Dish (Ana Gasteyer, Molly Shannon, Rachel Dratch, Alec Baldwin) – November 16, 1996
- Shopping At Home Network (Will Ferrell, Chris Kattan) – November 16, 1996
- Cinder Calhoun (Ana Gasteyer) – November 23, 1996
- Celebrity Jeopardy! (Will Ferrell, Darrell Hammond, Norm Macdonald, and various others) – December 7, 1996
- Janet Reno's Dance Party (Will Ferrell) – January 11, 1997
- The X-Presidents (a cartoon by Robert Smigel) – January 11, 1997
- The Atteburys (Ana Gasteyer, Mark McKinney/Will Ferrell) – January 11, 1997
- Wong & Owens, Ex-Porn Stars (Jim Breuer, Tracy Morgan) – January 18, 1997
- The Zimmermans (Chris Kattan, Cheri Oteri) – February 15, 1997
- The DeMarco Brothers (Chris Parnell, Chris Kattan) – March 15, 1997
- Dominican Lou (Tracy Morgan) – March 22, 1997
- Goth Talk (Molly Shannon, Chris Kattan, Jim Breuer) – April 12, 1997
- Collette Reardon (Cheri Oteri) – May 10, 1997
- Space, The Infinite Frontier (Will Ferrell) – May 17, 1997

== 1997–1998 ==
- Leon Phelps, The Ladies Man (Tim Meadows) – October 4, 1997
- Issues with Jeffrey Kaufman (Jim Breuer) – October 18, 1997
- Mango (Chris Kattan) – October 18, 1997
- Morning Latte (Cheri Oteri, Will Ferrell) – October 25, 1997
- Southern Gals (Ana Gasteyer, Cheri Oteri, Molly Shannon) – November 15, 1997
- Tiger Beat's Ultra Super Duper Dreamy Love Show (Ana Gasteyer, Cheri Oteri, Molly Shannon, Sarah Michelle Gellar) – January 15, 1998
- Gunner Olsen (Jim Breuer) – March 7, 1998
- The Céline Dion Show (Ana Gasteyer) – March 7, 1998
- Pretty Living (Molly Shannon, Ana Gasteyer) – March 14, 1998
- Terrence Maddox, Nude Model (Will Ferrell) – March 14, 1998

== 1998–1999 ==
- Jingleheimer Junction (Will Ferrell, Cameron Diaz, Horatio Sanz, Ana Gasteyer, Tim Meadows) – September 26, 1998
- Hello Dolly (Ana Gasteyer) – October 3, 1998
- The How Do You Say? Ah, Yes, Show (Chris Kattan) – October 17, 1998
- Dog Show (Will Ferrell, Molly Shannon) – December 5, 1998
- Pimp Chat (Tracy Morgan, Tim Meadows) – December 5, 1998
- Skeeter (Darrell Hammond) – January 9, 1999
- Brian Fellow's Safari Planet (Tracy Morgan) – January 16, 1999
- 7 Degrees Celsius (Will Ferrell, Chris Kattan, Chris Parnell, Jimmy Fallon, Horatio Sanz) – January 16, 1999
- Chet Harper (Ray Romano) – March 13, 1999

== 1999–2000 ==
- The Boston Teens (Jimmy Fallon, Rachel Dratch, Horatio Sanz, Ben Affleck) – November 13, 1999
- Nadeen (Cheri Oteri) – November 13, 1999
- Nick Burns, Your Company's Computer Guy (Jimmy Fallon) – November 20, 1999
- Jacob Silj (Will Ferrell) – December 4, 1999
- Sally O'Malley (Molly Shannon) – December 11, 1999
- Jasper Hahn (Horatio Sanz) – January 8, 2000
- Dr. Beamen (Will Ferrell) – January 15, 2000
- Joy Lipton (Cheri Oteri) – February 12, 2000
- The Bloder Brothers (Chris Parnell, Jimmy Fallon) – February 12, 2000
- Woodrow the Homeless Man (Tracy Morgan) – May 18, 2000

== 2000–2001 ==
- Gemini's Twin (Maya Rudolph, Ana Gasteyer) – November 4, 2000
- Jeannie Darcy (Molly Shannon) – November 18, 2000
- Rap Street (Jerry Minor, Horatio Sanz) – November 18, 2000
- Veronica & Co. (Molly Shannon, Chris Parnell) – December 9, 2000
- Jarret's Room (Jimmy Fallon, Horatio Sanz, Seth Meyers, Jeff Richards) – December 16, 2000
- Season's Greetings From Saturday Night Live (Christmas is Number One) (Horatio Sanz, Jimmy Fallon, Chris Kattan, Tracy Morgan) – December 16, 2000
- Jeffrey's (Jimmy Fallon, Will Ferrell) – February 17, 2001
- The Lovers (Will Ferrell, Rachel Dratch) – February 24, 2001
- Wake Up Wakefield! (Maya Rudolph, Rachel Dratch, Jimmy Fallon, Horatio Sanz) – March 17, 2001

== 2001–2002 ==
- Donatella Versace (Maya Rudolph) – September 29, 2001
- Gay Hitler (Chris Kattan) – October 13, 2001
- Nicole, The Girl With No Gaydar (Rachel Dratch) – November 3, 2001
- America Undercover (Chris Kattan, Amy Poehler) – November 3, 2001
- Drunk Girl (Jeff Richards) – December 8, 2001
- Astronaut Jones (Tracy Morgan) – February 2, 2002
- The Leather Man (Jimmy Fallon) – February 2, 2002
- Amber, the One-Legged Hypoglycemic (Amy Poehler) – March 2, 2002
- The Ferey Muhtar Talk Show (Horatio Sanz) – March 16, 2002

== 2002–2003 ==
- Fericito (Fred Armisen) – October 5, 2002
- Merv the Perv (Chris Parnell) – October 12, 2002
- Tim Calhoun (Will Forte) – October 19, 2002
- Top O' the Morning (Seth Meyers, Jimmy Fallon) – October 19, 2002
- Z105 with Joey Mack (Jimmy Fallon) – November 2, 2002
- Baby K (Jeff Richards) – November 2, 2002
- The Falconer (Will Forte) – November 9, 2002
- Glenda Goodwin (Maya Rudolph) – November 9, 2002
- Terrye Funck (Chris Parnell) – January 11, 2003
- Rialto Grande (Chris Kattan, Fred Armisen, Jimmy Fallon, and others) – January 18, 2003
- Club Traxx (Maya Rudolph, Fred Armisen) – February 8, 2003
- The Kelly Brothers (Fred Armisen, Will Forte) – February 8, 2003
- Pranksters (Seth Meyers) – February 22, 2003
- Don's Apothecary (Horatio Sanz) – March 8, 2003
- Adult Students (Tracy Morgan, Fred Armisen, Rachel Dratch, Horatio Sanz) – March 15, 2003

== 2003–2004 ==
- The Barry Gibb Talk Show (Jimmy Fallon, Justin Timberlake) – October 11, 2003
- Mascots (Justin Timberlake) – October 11, 2003
- Billy Smith (Fred Armisen) – October 18, 2003
- Starkishka & Appreciante (Finesse Mitchell, Maya Rudolph) – October 18, 2003
- Spy Glass (Amy Poehler, Seth Meyers) – November 1, 2003
- Terrell and his wife (J. B. Smoove, Paula Pell) – November 1, 2003
- Dave "Zinger" Clinger (Seth Meyers) – November 15, 2003
- Abe Scheinwald (Rachel Dratch) – November 15, 2003
- Appalachian Emergency Room (Seth Meyers, Chris Parnell, Darrell Hammond, Amy Poehler and various others) – January 10, 2004
- The Prince Show (Fred Armisen, Maya Rudolph) – February 14, 2004
- ¡Show Biz Grande Explosion! (Fred Armisen as Fericito (see 2002–2003), Horatio Sanz) – March 6, 2004
- Debbie Downer (Rachel Dratch) – May 1, 2004
- Kaitlin & Rick (Amy Poehler, Horatio Sanz) – May 1, 2004
- Jorge Rodriguez (Horatio Sanz) – May 1, 2004
- Pat 'N Patti Silviac (Horatio Sanz, Maya Rudolph) – May 15, 2004

== 2004–2005 ==
- Bear City – October 23, 2004
- Carol! (Horatio Sanz) – December 11, 2004
- Phoebe and her Giant Pets (Rachel Dratch, Fred Armisen) – November 13, 2004
- Noony and Nuni Schoener, Art Dealers (Fred Armisen, Maya Rudolph, Chris Parnell) – January 15, 2005
- The Lundford Twins Feel Good Variety Hour (Fred Armisen, Amy Poehler) – January 22, 2005
- Gays In Space (Fred Armisen, Chris Parnell, Maya Rudolph, Kenan Thompson) – February 12, 2005

== 2005–2006 ==
- Voice Recording Woman (Rachel Dratch) – October 8, 2005
- Deep House Dish (Kenan Thompson, Rachel Dratch, Andy Samberg) – November 19, 2005
- Vincent Price's Holiday Special (Bill Hader) – November 19, 2005
- Target Lady (Kristen Wiig) – December 3, 2005
- Two A-Holes (Kristen Wiig, Jason Sudeikis) – December 17, 2005
- Mike and Lexie (Fred Armisen, Scarlett Johansson) – January 14, 2006
- Natalie Raps (Natalie Portman, Andy Samberg) – March 4, 2006
- Introverts' Night Out (Will Forte, Kristen Wiig) – April 15, 2006

== 2006–2007 ==
- Jon Bovi (Will Forte, Jason Sudeikis) – October 7, 2006
- Two Gay Guys (Fred Armisen, Bill Hader) – October 28, 2006
- Aunt Linda (Kristen Wiig) – November 11, 2006
- Blizzard Man (Andy Samberg) – November 18, 2006
- Dick In A Box Guys (Andy Samberg, Justin Timberlake) – December 16, 2006
- Bronx Beat (Amy Poehler, Maya Rudolph) – January 13, 2007
- MacGruber (Will Forte) – January 20, 2007
- Really?!? (Seth Meyers, Amy Poehler) – January 20, 2007
- Danny Hoover (Andy Samberg) – January 20, 2007
- The Dakota Fanning Show (Amy Poehler, Kenan Thompson) – February 3, 2007
- Song Memories – February 24, 2007
- La Rivista Della Televisione (Bill Hader, Fred Armisen) – March 17, 2007
- Penelope (Kristen Wiig) – March 24, 2007

== 2007–2008 ==
- Nicholas Fehn (Fred Armisen) – October 13, 2007
- Jean K. Jean (Kenan Thompson) – March 8, 2008
- The Suze Orman Show (Kristen Wiig) – March 15, 2008
- Adam Grossman (Jonah Hill) – March 15, 2008
- Sue (Kristen Wiig) – April 5, 2008
- The Cougar Den (Cameron Diaz, Amy Poehler, Kristen Wiig, Casey Wilson) – April 12, 2008
- Judy Grimes (Kristen Wiig) – April 12, 2008
- Scared Straight (Kenan Thompson, Jason Sudeikis, Andy Samberg, Bill Hader, Bobby Moynihan) – May 10, 2008

== 2008–2009 ==
- Googie Rene (Kenan Thompson) – September 27, 2008
- The Lawrence Welk Show (Fred Armisen, Kristen Wiig) – October 4, 2008
- Jeff Montgomery (Will Forte) – October 25, 2008
- Stefon (Bill Hader) – November 1, 2008
- Grady Wilson (Kenan Thompson) – November 1, 2008
- The Vogelchecks (Fred Armisen, Kristen Wiig, Bill Hader) – November 15, 2008
- Dateline (Bill Hader) – November 22, 2008
- Shana (Kristen Wiig) – December 6, 2008
- Gilly (Kristen Wiig) – January 17, 2009
- Angie Tempura (Michaela Watkins) – February 14, 2009
- Game Time With Randy And Greg (Bill Hader, Kenan Thompson) – March 7, 2009
- Hamilton (Will Forte) – May 16, 2009

== 2009–2010 ==
- Pete Twinkle and Greg Stink (Will Forte, Jason Sudeikis) – October 10, 2009
- What Up with That? (Kenan Thompson) – October 17, 2009
- Hollywood Dish (Bill Hader, Kristen Wiig) – November 7, 2009
- Roger Brush (Fred Armisen) – November 21, 2009
- Secret Word (Bill Hader, Kristen Wiig) – November 21, 2009
- Kickspit Underground Festival (Jason Sudeikis, Nasim Pedrad, Bobby Moynihan) – December 5, 2009
- Tina Tina Cheneuse (Jenny Slate) – December 12, 2009
- Garth and Kat (Fred Armisen, Kristen Wiig) – December 19, 2009
- The Manuel Ortiz Show (Fred Armisen) – December 19, 2009
- Bedelia (Nasim Pedrad) – April 10, 2010
- The Devil (Jason Sudeikis) – April 10, 2010
- Mort Mort Feingold – Accountant for the Stars (Andy Samberg) – April 17, 2010
- Anthony Crispino (Bobby Moynihan) – April 17, 2010

== 2010–2011 ==
- The Miley Cyrus Show (Vanessa Bayer) – October 2, 2010
- Les Jeunes de Paris (Taran Killam) – October 23, 2010
- "Sex" Ed Vincent (Paul Brittain) – October 23, 2010
- Laura Parsons (Vanessa Bayer) – November 13, 2010
- The Essentials with Robert Osborne (Jason Sudeikis) – November 20, 2010
- Visiting the Queen (Fred Armisen, Bill Hader) – November 20, 2010
- Herb Welch (Bill Hader) – November 20, 2010
- Julian Assange (Bill Hader) – December 4, 2010
- Principal Daniel Frye (Jay Pharoah) – December 11, 2010
- What's That Name? (Bill Hader) – December 11, 2010
- Merryville Carnival Ride (Bill Hader, Taran Killam, other) – January 8, 2011
- Triangle Sally (Kristen Wiig) – January 8, 2011
- Jacob the Bar Mitzvah Boy (Vanessa Bayer) – January 15, 2011
- The Original Kings of Catchphrase Comedy (Kenan Thompson, Paul Brittain, Bobby Moynihan, Seth Meyers) – March 12, 2011
- Get in the Cage! (Andy Samberg) – April 2, 2011
- The Best of Both Worlds (Andy Samberg) – April 9, 2011
- Bongo's Clown Room (Jason Sudeikis) – April 9, 2011
- Dictator's Two Best Friends From Growing Up (Fred Armisen, Vanessa Bayer) – May 7, 2011

== 2011–2012 ==
- Movie Screen Tests (Various) – September 24, 2011
- J-Pop America Fun Time Now (Taran Killam, Vanessa Bayer, Jason Sudeikis) – October 15, 2011
- Lord Wyndemere (Paul Brittain) – October 15, 2011
- Getting Freaky with Cee-Lo Green! (Kenan Thompson) – November 5, 2011
- We're Going to Make Technology Hump (Andy Samberg) – November 12, 2011
- Drunk Uncle (Bobby Moynihan) – December 3, 2011
- Janet Peckinpah (Bobby Moynihan) – February 4, 2012
- Bein' Quirky with Zooey Deschanel (Abby Elliott, Taran Killam) – February 11, 2012
- How's He Doing? (Kenan Thompson, Jay Pharoah) – February 19, 2012
- B108 FM (Taran Killam, Bobby Moynihan) – March 4, 2012
- The Californians (Fred Armisen, Bill Hader, Kristen Wiig, Vanessa Bayer) – April 14, 2012

== 2012–2013 ==
- Puppet Class (Bill Hader) – September 15, 2012
- The Girl You Wish You Hadn't Started A Conversation With At A Party (Cecily Strong) – September 27, 2012
- Regine (Fred Armisen) – October 6, 2012
- Kirby (Bobby Moynihan) – October 6, 2012
- Last Call (Sheila Sovage) (Kate McKinnon, Kenan Thompson) – November 3, 2012
- Girlfriends Talk Show (Aidy Bryant, Cecily Strong) – November 10, 2012
- Niff and Dana (Bobby Moynihan, Cecily Strong) – November 10, 2012
- The Ellen Show (Kate McKinnon) – November 10, 2012
- Maine Justice (Jason Sudeikis) – December 8, 2012
- Former Porn Star Commercials (Vanessa Bayer, Cecily Strong) – December 8, 2012
- Eddie (Taran Killam) – February 9, 2013
- Olya Povlatsky (Kate McKinnon) – February 16, 2013
- Sheila Kelly (Melissa McCarthy) – April 6, 2013
- 90's Dating Tips (Cecily Strong, Kate McKinnon) – April 6, 2013

== 2013–2014 ==
- Bruce Chandling (Kyle Mooney) – September 28, 2013
- Cinema Classics (Kenan Thompson) – September 28, 2013
- Mornin' Miami! (Bobby Moynihan, Kate McKinnon, Vanessa Bayer) – October 5, 2013
- Miss Meadows (poetry teacher) (Vanessa Bayer) – October 5, 2013
- Inside SoCal (Kyle Mooney, Beck Bennett, Bobby Moynihan) – October 5, 2013
- Miley tapes (Miley Cyrus, Kyle Mooney) – October 5, 2013
- Shallon (Nasim Pedrad) – October 26, 2013
- Holiday Food – October 26, 2013
- Heshy Farahat (Nasim Pedrad, Mike O'Brien) – November 2, 2013
- Waking up with Kimye (Nasim Pedrad, Jay Pharoah) – November 16, 2013
- Jebidiah Atkinson (Taran Killam) – November 16, 2013
- Mr. Patterson (Baby Boss) (Beck Bennett) – November 23, 2013
- Animal Hospital (Vet Office) (Cecily Strong, Kate McKinnon) – November 23, 2013
- Family Feud (Kenan Thompson) – December 21, 2013
- Melanie (Aidy Bryant) – January 18, 2014
- Tonkerbell (Aidy Bryant) – March 1, 2014
- Black Jeopardy (Jay Pharoah, Kenan Thompson, Sasheer Zamata) – March 29, 2014
- Chris Fitzpatrick (Kyle Mooney) – March 29, 2014
- Leslie Jones (Leslie Jones) – May 3, 2014
- Whiskers R We (Kate McKinnon) – May 10, 2014

== 2014–2015 ==
- Hollywood Game Night (Kate McKinnon) – October 11, 2014
- How 2 Dance With Janelle (Sasheer Zamata, Kyle Mooney, Jay Pharoah) – November 1, 2014
- High School Theater Show (Aidy Bryant, Beck Bennett, Kyle Mooney, Taran Killam, Kate McKinnon, Vanessa Bayer, Kenan Thompson) – November 22, 2014
- Cathy Anne (Cecily Strong) – December 6, 2014
- Right Side of the Bed! (Taran Killam, Cecily Strong) – December 13, 2014
- A One-Dimensional Female Character from a Male-Driven Comedy (Cecily Strong) – December 13, 2014
- Treece Henderson and his band (Kenan Thompson, Kyle Mooney) – December 13, 2014
- Willie (Kenan Thompson) – December 20, 2014
- Frida Santini (Kate McKinnon) – January 17, 2015
- Hunk (Cecily Strong, Kate McKinnon, Aidy Bryant) – January 24, 2015
- Riblet (Bobby Moynihan) – January 24, 2015
- Totino's Lady (Vanessa Bayer) – January 31, 2015
- Brother 2 Brother (Chris Hemsworth, Taran Killam) – March 7, 2015
- The House (Beck Bennett, Kyle Mooney) – March 7, 2015
- Gerard, a former acting coach on The Jeffersons (Kenan Thompson) – March 7, 2015
- Gemma (Cecily Strong) – March 28, 2015
- The Janet Johnson-Luna Civil Trial (Pete Davidson, Cecily Strong) – April 11, 2015
- Kinky Elves (Vanessa Bayer, Kenan Thompson) – May 16, 2015

== 2015–2016 ==
- Young Girl Interrupting Porn Shoots (Aidy Bryant) – October 10, 2015
- Citizens Forum (Bobby Moynihan, Cecily Strong, Aidy Bryant, Kyle Mooney) – October 10, 2015
- Colleen Rafferty (Kate McKinnon) – December 5, 2015
- Deenie, Somebody's Mom (Kate McKinnon) – December 19, 2015
- Undercover Boss (Adam Driver) – January 16, 2016
- America's Funniest Pets (Kate McKinnon, Cecily Strong) – January 16, 2016
- True Tales From The Sea (Kate McKinnon) – March 12, 2016
- Shanice Goodwin: Ninja (Leslie Jones) – April 9, 2016
- Chad (Pete Davidson) – April 16, 2016
- Suburban Mothers (Cecily Strong, Vanessa Bayer, Aidy Bryant, Sasheer Zamata, Kate McKinnon, Leslie Jones) – May 7, 2016

== 2016–2017 ==
- Debette Goldry (Kate McKinnon) – October 1, 2016
- Action 9 News at Five (Beck Bennett, Cecily Strong, Mikey Day, Leslie Jones) – October 1, 2016
- Matt Schatt (Mikey Day, Kenan Thompson, Beck Bennett) – October 1, 2016
- Melania Moments (Cecily Strong) – October 1, 2016
- David S. Pumpkins (Tom Hanks) – October 22, 2016
- Leslie & Kyle love story (Leslie Jones, Kyle Mooney, Colin Jost) – November 12, 2016
- Posters (Emma Stone, Pete Davidson, Mikey Day) – December 3, 2016
- Pete Davidson's First Impressions (Pete Davidson) – January 14, 2017
- Dirty Talk (Melissa Villaseñor) – January 21, 2017
- The Duncans (Mikey Day, Leslie Jones) – February 11, 2017
- Guy Who Just Bought A Boat (Alex Moffat) – February 11, 2017
- Eric and Donald Trump Jr. (Mikey Day, Alex Moffat) – March 4, 2017
- Dog Translator (Scarlett Johansson, Kyle Mooney, Mikey Day, Cecily Strong, Alex Moffat) – March 11, 2017
- Dawn Lazarus (Vanessa Bayer) – May 6, 2017
- Morning Joe (Alex Moffat, Kate McKinnon, Mikey Day) – May 6, 2017

== 2017–2018 ==
- Marketing Campaign (Cecily Strong, Mikey Day) – September 30, 2017
- Fresh Takes (Mikey Day, Alex Moffat, Kate McKinnon) – November 4, 2017
- Angel, Every Boxer's Girlfriend from Every Movie About Boxing Ever (Heidi Gardner) – November 4, 2017
- Lazlo Holmes (Chance the Rapper) – November 18, 2017
- Sexual Harassment Charlie (Kenan Thompson, Beck Bennett, Mikey Day, Cecily Strong) – December 9, 2017
- Cousin Mandy (Heidi Gardner) – December 9, 2017
- Science Room (Mikey Day, Cecily Strong) – January 13, 2018
- Dog Head Man (Mikey Day) – January 13, 2018
- Bailey Gismert (Heidi Gardner) – January 27, 2018
- Dinner Discussion (Aidy Bryant, Heidi Gardner, Kate McKinnon, Kenan Thompson) – January 27, 2018
- Big Nick's (John Mulaney, Pete Davidson, Chris Redd, Kenan Thompson, Cecily Strong, Kate McKinnon) – April 14, 2018
- Mattel Instagram Pitch (Kenan Thompson, Cecily Strong, Pete Davidson, Heidi Gardner) – May 5, 2018

== 2018–2019 ==
- Thirsty Cops (Ego Nwodim, Kate McKinnon) – October 13, 2018
- Deidre (Heidi Gardner) – October 13, 2018
- Baskin Johns (Heidi Gardner) – October 13, 2018
- Brothers (Beck Bennett, Kyle Mooney, Cecily Strong, Kenan Thompson, Aidy Bryant) – November 10, 2018
- The War in Words (Mikey Day) – December 1, 2018
- Jules, Who Sees Things a Little Differently (Beck Bennett) – December 1, 2018
- Them Trumps (Kenan Thompson, Leslie Jones, Ego Nwodim, Chris Redd) – December 8, 2018
- Travel Expert Carrie Krum (Aidy Bryant) – December 8, 2018
- Name Change Office (Mikey Day, Pete Davidson) – January 19, 2019
- Nico Slobkin and Brie Bacardi (Mikey Day, Heidi Gardner) – February 9, 2019
- Ultimate Baking Championship (Alex Moffat, Heidi Gardner, Kyle Mooney, Aidy Bryant, Beck Bennett, Ego Nwodim) – February 16, 2019
- Supercentenarian Mort Fellner (Mikey Day) – February 16, 2019
- Line Dancing (John Mulaney, Ego Nwodim, Kenan Thompson) – March 2, 2019
- Smokery Farms (Kate McKinnon, Aidy Bryant) – March 2, 2019
- Henriette and Nan (Kate McKinnon, Aidy Bryant) – March 9, 2019
- Terry Fink (Alex Moffat) – April 6, 2019
- What's Wrong with This Picture? (Kenan Thompson, Aidy Bryant) – May 18, 2019

== 2019–2020 ==
- Mid-Day News (Kenan Thompson, Ego Nwodim) – October 5, 2019
- Chen Biao (Bowen Yang) – October 5, 2019
- Instructor Auditions (Ego Nwodim, Bowen Yang, Cecily Strong, Heidi Gardner) – October 12, 2019
- Sisters and the Soldier (Kate McKinnon, Aidy Bryant, Beck Bennett) – December 7, 2019
- Baby Yoda (Kyle Mooney) – December 14, 2019
- Sleepover Incident (Kate McKinnon, Aidy Bryant, Heidi Gardner, Melissa Villaseñor, Ego Nwodim, Chloe Fineman) – January 25, 2020
- Uncle Meme (John Mulaney, Pete Davidson) – February 29, 2020
- MasterClass Quarantine Edition (Chloe Fineman) – April 11, 2020

== 2020–2021 ==
Title	Premiere date	Main actor(s)	Description
Edith Puthie	October 3, 2020	Ego Nwodim	An inappropriately named middle-aged woman (Ego Nwodim) from the "Name Change Office" and "Boomers Got the Vax" sketches.
Dr. Wayne Wenowdis	October 10, 2020	Kate McKinnon	Weekend Update's resident medical expert (Kate McKinnon) who always replies with "We know dis". The pieces end with McKinnon breaking character to address her anxieties regarding the COVID-19 pandemic.
SmokeCheddaDaAssGetta and Nunya Bizness	December 12, 2020	Timothee Chalamet, Ego Nwodim	White rapper SmokeCheddaDaAssGetta (Timothee Chalamet) appears on Nunya Bizness' (Ego Nwodim) talk show to voice his opinions on hip hop.
The Dionne Warwick Talk Show	December 12, 2020	Ego Nwodim, Punkie Johnson, Andrew Dismukes, Melissa Villaseñor, Pete Davidson, Lauren Holt	Dionne Warwick (Ego Nwodim) hosts a talk show while showing how out-of-touch she is with modern pop culture (e.g. pronouncing Billie Eilish as "Billie Eyelash").
Wooden Signs	February 13, 2021	Aidy Bryant	A middle-aged woman receives decorative signs with quotes from her friends and family with progressively more offensive quotes.
Oops, You Did It Again	February 20, 2021	Chloe Fineman	Britney Spears (Chloe Fineman) hosts a talk show in which she interviews guests that have been victims of cancel culture and gives them a chance to apologize for their prior incidents.
Pauline, a Weary Mother in Her Darkest Hour	May 8, 2021	Ego Nwodim	A worn-out woman (Ego Nwodim) appears on Weekend Update to lament her experiences as a mother.

== 2021–2022 ==
Title	Premiere date	Main actor(s)	Description
Angelo	October 16, 2021	Aristotle Athari	"International singing sensation" Angelo (Aristotle Athari) performs at an exclusive venue, performing supposedly improvised songs from word prompts given by exasperated audience members.
TikTok	December 11, 2021	Aidy Bryant	An unseen teenager scrolls through a series of eccentric videos on TikTok to avoid chores.
Trend Forecasters	January 29, 2022	Aidy Bryant; Bowen Yang	Two fashionable people (Aidy Bryant and Bowen Yang) report data on which trends are what's in and what's out.
Shoptv	April 2, 2022	Mikey Day; Cecily Strong; Heidi Gardner	Two TV shopping network hosts (Mikey Day & Cecily Strong/Heidi Gardner/Ashley Padilla) present a seller (played by the host) with an inappropriate product which results in sexual innuendos and dirty phone calls
Why'd You Do That	April 9, 2022	Kenan Thompson; Chloe Fineman	Danny Donnigan (Thompson) hosts a game show where he grills the contestants (consisting of Fineman, one or two other cast members, and the episode's host) on their questionable social media interactions.

== 2022–2023 ==
Title	Premiere date	Main actor(s)	Description
Big Dumb Things	November 5, 2022	Chloe Fineman; Heidi Gardner	Three Caucasian blonde women (Fineman, Gardner, the episode's host) advertise the latest large item that's become popular among their demographic.
Protective Mom	February 4, 2023	Pedro Pascal; Marcello Hernández	Mrs. Flores (Pascal) disapproves of the women her son Luis (Hernández) dates, and rants about them in Spanish.
Lisa from Temecula	February 4, 2023	Ego Nwodim; Punkie Johnson; Bowen Yang	Lisa from Temecula (Nwodim) disrupts her sister's (Johnson) social life.
Garrett from Hinge	March 4, 2023	Bowen Yang	Garrett (Bowen Yang) interrupts a couple after being stood up by the woman.
Varsity Valley	March 11, 2023	Marcello Hernández; Andrew Dismukes; Heidi Gardner; Punkie Johnson; Ego Nwodim; Kenan Thompson; Molly Kearney; Devon Walker	
Jingle Pitch	March 11, 2023	James Austin Johnson; Andrew Dismukes; Bowen Yang; Chloe Fineman; Devon Walker	Two members of Soul Booth (James Austin Johnson, Andrew Dismukes) try to come up with a new jingle for a company.
Couple Goals	April 1, 2023	James Austin Johnson	Game show about couple goals, where one couple shares very intense theories and thoughts about what would happen to their partner.
Driving Altercations	April 1, 2023	Mikey Day; Chloe Fineman	Two people (Mikey Day, the episode's host) get into an argument in a driving scenario and use obscene hand gestures to narrate their argument. Also stars Chloe Fineman as Madison, an embarrassed daughter who would often use gestures filled with sexual innuendo.
Crystal	April 8, 2023	Heidi Gardner	A co-worker who's busy doing absolutely nothing (Heidi Gardner) who appears on Weekend Update.
Recording Session	April 15, 2023	Devon Walker; Kenan Thompson; Ego Nwodim	Two female artists (Ego Nwodim, the episode's host) try to record a producer tag for Young Spicy (Devon Walker), but they end up being derogatory.

== 2023–2024 ==
Title	Premiere date	Main actor(s)	Description
Secretary	October 14, 2023	Heidi Gardner; Bowen Yang	In a 1960s law office, hyper secretary Trudy (Heidi Gardner) is manically predictive.
Dr. Please	October 28, 2023	Bowen Yang	Oddball Dr. Please (Bowen Yang).
Washington's Dream	October 28, 2023	Nate Bargatze; James Austin Johnson; Kenan Thompson; Mikey Day; Bowen Yang	During the Revolutionary War, general George Washington (Bargatze) tells his troops (Johnson, Thompson, Day, Yang) about his dreams for the new nation they are fighting for, which include a vast amount of idiosyncrasies that make little sense to even Americans (e.g., weights and measures, miles vs kilometers, unique spellings of certain English words, etc.).
Airport Parade	November 18, 2023	Ego Nwodim; Bowen Yang	
Immigrant Dad Talk Show	March 30, 2024	Marcello Hernández; Mikey Day; Andrew Dismukes	Joaquín Antonio González Hernández Suárez (Hernández) hosts a show, alongside another character (played by the episode's host), who frequently joke about their sons and their life choices. Recurring characters who appear on the show include Kevin (Day), a white man who engages in unique relationship dynamics with his son Connor (Dismukes), which González and his co-host find off-putting.

== 2024–2025 ==
Title	Premiere date	Main actor(s)	Description
Sábado Gigante	October 5, 2024	Marcello Hernández	A parody of the Spanish-language variety show Sábado Gigante, starring Marcello Hernández as Don Francisco. The sketch usually involves an Anglophone, non-Hispanic audience member character who is very hesitant to play in one of the show's segments.
Domingo	October 12, 2024	Heidi Gardner; Ego Nwodim; Sarah Sherman; Chloe Fineman; Andrew Dismukes; Marcello Hernández	Husband and wife, Matthew (Dismukes) and Kelsey (Fineman), are celebrating an achievement in their relationship when Kelsey's friends (Gardner, Nwodim, Sherman, and the episode's host) perform a poorly-sung parody of a popular song that details a trip they took to another state. The song ends up revealing information about Kelsey having an affair with a man named Domingo (Hernández), who shows up at the end to clarify the revelations to Matthew.
Saturday Night Live Midnight Matinee	October 12, 2024		
Grant and Alyssa	November 2, 2024	Marcello Hernández; Jane Wickline	Dubbed as "The Couple You Can't Believe Are Together", Grant (Hernández) and Alyssa (Wickline) play a couple on Weekend Update whose personalities vastly contrast each other, with Grant being loud, talkative and extroverted, and Alyssa being reserved, quiet, and introverted.
Acting Teacher	November 16, 2024	Marcello Hernandez; Chloe Fineman; Andrew Dismukes	Theodore Strop (Hernández) teaches an acting class for commercial acting. His methods are unconventional and bizarre, much to the chagrin of students Lacey and David (Fineman and Dismukes), who express bewilderment and frustration on said methods. The host would play a student who Strop sees as one of his "star students".
The Movie Guy	March 1, 2025	Marcello Hernández	Marcello Hernández plays The Movie Guy on Weekend Update. He is asked for his opinions on movies, but oftentimes, he hasn’t seen the movies being talked about.

== 2025–2026 ==
Title	Premiere date	Main actor(s)	Description
Snack Homiez	October 18, 2025	Sabrina Carpenter; Chloe Fineman; Veronika Slowikowska; Jane Wickline	Tween boys, Tayson (Carpenter), Braylor (Fineman), Jason (Slowikowska) and Kyler (Wickline) talk about food on their podcast with one or more special guests joining midway through.
A Film by Martin Herlihy	October 18, 2025	Martin Herlihy	
Two People Who Just Hooked Up	November 1, 2025	Andrew Dismukes; Ashley Padilla	Two people who just hooked up (Dismukes and Padilla), offer commentary on current events, riddled with sexual innuendos.
Brad and His Dad	November 8, 2025	Mikey Day; Streeter Seidell	Animated segments where Brad's (Day) divorced father (Seidell), attempts to connect with his son.
Norwegian Movie	November 15, 2025	Mikey Day; Chloe Fineman; Jane Wickline	A Norwegian actress (Fineman), and her co-star in a gloomy film immediately break character after the director (Day) says 'cut'.
Mr. On Blast	January 24, 2026	Jeremy Culhane	Mr. On Blast (Culhane) delievers tepid roasts capped off with a synth solo and dance breaks varying in complexity.
Kathy	April 4, 2026	Ashley Padilla	Kathy is an annoying co-worker who tries to butt into conversations she isn't invited into by saying "We talkin' (whatever topic they are talking about)". In the second episode with Kathy on Nov. 14, 2026, in addition to the skit with her co-workers at a bar after work, she shows up near the end of the traditional John Mulaney NYC musical sketch when horse draw carriages are being discussed to repeat a line from the first sketch "We talkin' transpo?".
