= Recurring Saturday Night Live characters and sketches introduced 1979–80 =

The following is a list of recurring Saturday Night Live characters and sketches introduced between October 13, 1979, and May 24, 1980, the fifth season of SNL.

== Z-Jones ==
A Laraine Newman Weekend Update character. A tomboyish music critic. Debuted April 14, 1979.

== Tom Clay ==
A Harry Shearer sketch. Debuted October 20, 1979.

== The Bel-Airabs ==
The Bel-Airabs was a sketch from the 1979–1980 season. It was a spoof of The Beverly Hillbillies, instead featuring paranoid Arabs. Only two sketches appeared, on December 8, 1979 (host: Howard Hesseman) and February 9, 1980 (host: Chevy Chase). As all of the cast members left the show at the end of that season, it was not continued.

It appears to have been an offshoot of Gilda Radner's "Granny" character, which had appeared in a sketch called "The Shah's Final Days" during the previous season.

=== Cast ===
- Abdul Asad - Don Novello
- Fatima Asad - Laraine Newman
- Mudhad Asad - Bill Murray
- Granny - Gilda Radner
- Miss Hathaway - Jane Curtin

== Big Vic Ricker ==
Ricker, portrayed by Harry Shearer, succeeded Chico Escuela as Weekend Update's sports commentator. He was prone to speaking very fast and in a gruff voice. Debuted January 26, 1980.

== Iris De Flaminio ==
A Jane Curtin sketch. Debuted April 5, 1980.

== Shonda The Cat Lady ==
A Laraine Newman one time character. A flirty cat lady with a fervent passion for masochistic sex and use of sadistic toys and disgusting tools. Debuted May 10, 1980.

Preceded by Recurring Saturday Night Live characters and sketches introduced 1978–1979	Recurring Saturday Night Live characters and sketches (listed chronologically)	Succeeded by Recurring Saturday Night Live characters and sketches introduced 1980–1981
