= Blizzard Man =

- Saturday Night Live character
- Blizzard Man appearing in a sketch featuring Ludacris and T-Pain
- First appearance: November 18, 2006
- Last appearance: May 17, 2014
- Portrayed by: Andy Samberg

In-universe information
- Nicknames: Blizz, Blizzard the Wizard, Blizzy B, Blizz Nasty
- Gender: Male

Blizzard Man is a recurring sketch by Andy Samberg on the American television program Saturday Night Live. The sketch features Samberg as the title character who is brought in to recording studios to assist musicians with an in-progress song, only for them to find that his musical ability is limited to a cheesy parody of serious rap music. Despite this, the sketch always concludes with the artists recording with him anyway. Guests stars for the sketch in the past have included Ludacris, T-Pain, P. Diddy, Common, and 2 Chainz as themselves and Tim McGraw and Robert De Niro playing fictional characters.

== Format ==
The sketch's premise is typically that a music producer is looking for additional talent in recording a rap song with another musician. The producer will suggest recruiting Blizzard Man for help. Typically the producer speaks very highly of Blizzard Man, making bold claims such as that his rapping rivals other popular artists, such as Trey Songz or Bruno Mars, only to see that Blizzard Man looks like Vanilla Ice and has terrible vocals as well as laughable lyrics. To make things worse, he often uses nonsensical 1990s-inspired catchphrases such as "Word is bond" and "What it do?" while alluding to similarly outdated things such as Jordache jeans or claiming that it is actually 1995. Typically, the character is in the recording musician role and Kenan Thompson, playing a recording engineer in the studio, right away strongly opposes Blizzard Man's music and mannerisms, but as the sketch progresses, they are eventually swayed by Blizzard Man's performances (which, in reality, never change or actually get better), and the enthusiasm of the producer.

== Episodes ==
=== November 18, 2006 ===
In the original sketch, Saturday Night Live cast members Jason Sudeikis and Maya Rudolph play record producers, and Ludacris guest stars, as himself, as a musician who acknowledges he needs help with his newest recording. Unlike the later variations of the sketch, the musician, Ludacris, is trying to convince the record producers that Blizzard Man should be utilized as a musician. Ludacris ultimately succeeds in convincing them.

=== January 20, 2007 ===
Jeremy Piven guest stars as the music producer who supports Blizzard Man. Common guest stars as the musician who initially opposes, but eventually embraces, recording with him.

=== November 22, 2008 ===
Tim McGraw guest stars as Blizzard Man's manager. Ludacris guest stars, as himself, as the music producer who supports Blizzard Man, and T-Pain guest stars, as himself, as the musician who is initially opposed, but eventually embraces, recording with him.

=== December 4, 2010 ===
Robert De Niro guest stars as Blizzard Man's mother. Sean Combs (P. Diddy) guest stars, as himself, as the music producer that supports Blizzard Man.

=== May 17, 2014 ===
2 Chainz guest stars, as himself, as the music producer that supports Blizzard Man.

=== Outside SNL ===
In 2007, to promote Ludacris donating a motorcycle to a charity auction, he and Samberg created an additional skit, not shown on SNL. The skit involves Ludacris looking for a rapper to advertise for said auction, which results with him eventually deciding on Blizzard Man's song.

== Reception ==
Reception for the sketch has been mostly positive, especially the episode featuring Robert De Niro. Billboard called it a "home run", especially praising De Niro's role in drag as Blizzard Man's mother. MTV also praised it, calling it "one of the highlights of the episode," especially the prospect of Diddy and De Niro flirting with each other. Movieline was positive as well, calling it one of the De Niro's sketches that "delivered A-material". PopCrunch said of the sketch, "nobody does dorky white rapper like Samberg", while the Huffington Post used the sketch as an example of how legendary actor Robert De Niro never got sillier. Zap2it described it as "kind of hilarious" and concluded "we gotta give props to Diddy hitting on him (her) and declaring, 'If you weren't my man's mom, I'd tear that ass up.'"

Other Blizzard Man sketches were praised as well. Prefix Mag called the T Pain, Ludacris, and Tim McGraw episode "hilarious" and urged readers to watch it. In 2019, Billboard named it as one of SNLs best rap-themed sketches.

== See also ==
- Recurring Saturday Night Live characters and sketches
