= Recurring Saturday Night Live characters and sketches introduced 1978–79 =

The following is a list of recurring Saturday Night Live characters and sketches introduced between October 7, 1978, and May 26, 1979, the fourth season of SNL.

== Honker the Homeless Man ==
A Bill Murray sketch. Debuted October 14, 1978.

Appearances

Season	Episode	Host
4	October 14, 1978	Fred Willard
4	December 16, 1978	Elliott Gould
4	March 10, 1979	Gary Busey
5	November 10, 1979	Buck Henry
5	March 15, 1980	none
7	December 12, 1981	Bill Murray
12	March 21, 1987	Bill Murray
18	February 20, 1993	Bill Murray

== At the Mall ==
Debuted October 14, 1978.

This sketch satirized the trend of suburban shopping malls sucking the life out of American cities.

Appearances

Season	Episode	Host	Location
4	October 14, 1978	Fred Willard	Scotch Boutique
4	February 17, 1979	Ricky Nelson	D&R Men's Hairstylists
4	May 19, 1979	Maureen Stapleton	Candy Store
5	November 3, 1979	Bill Russell	Barry White's Big and Tall That's All

== Woman to Woman ==
A talk show sendup where feminist Connie Carson (Gilda Radner) speaks with professional women about their careers. Debuted October 21, 1978.

Appearances

Season	Episode	Host	Carson's guest
4	October 21, 1978	Frank Zappa	Mrs. Post (Jane Curtin)
4	December 2, 1978	Walter Matthau	Vanessa Lake (Laraine Newman)
5	November 17, 1979	Bea Arthur	Rosemary O'Connell (Bea Arthur)

== Uncle Roy ==
A Buck Henry sketch; made two appearances in season 4 and one in season 5. Debuted November 11, 1978.

Appearances

Season	Episode
4	November 11, 1978
4	May 26, 1979
5	May 24, 1980

== St. Mickey's Knights of Columbus ==
A small series of sketches set in the "spaghetti dinner" meetings of a Knights of Columbus lodge. Each sketch involves a prize being given to someone ironically in absentia and ends with a traditional song that only the least expected person remembers the words to. Debuted November 11, 1978.

Appearances

Season	Episode	Host
4	November 11, 1978	Buck Henry
4	December 16, 1978	Elliott Gould
4	March 17, 1979	Margot Kidder

== Chico Escuela ==
Chico Escuela (literal translation: "Boy School", but more likely "Little School," as Chico means small or little when used as an adjective - essentially little education), played by Garrett Morris, was the Weekend Update sports correspondent. A retired Hispanic ballplayer with limited command of the English language, he wrote the tell-all book Bad Stuff 'Bout the Mets ("Ed Kranepool - he once borrow Chico's soap and no give it back"). The character was first introduced in a St. Mickey's Knights of Columbus sketch, but subsequently Escuela appeared solely on Update.

Typically he would be introduced by Jane Curtin, thus compelling him to say, "Thank you, Hane!" Soon would follow his standard catchphrase: "Beisbol been berry, berry good to me!" In spring training of 1979, Chico's unsuccessful comeback attempt was documented on several Update segments.

The segments were actually filmed at the Miller Huggins Field in St. Petersburg, Florida. Sammy Sosa, at the peak of his stardom in the late 1990s, would sometimes repeat Chico's catchphrase as a joke to the media, albeit in his true-to-life strong Hispanic accent.

Appearances

Season	Episode	Host	Notes
4	December 9, 1978	Eric Idle	
4	January 27, 1979	Michael Palin	
4	February 17, 1979	Ricky Nelson	
4	April 7, 1979	Richard Benjamin	Chico's Comeback (part 1 of 3)
4	April 14, 1979	Milton Berle	Chico's Comeback (part 2 of 3)
4	May 12, 1979	Michael Palin	Chico's Comeback (part 3 of 3)
5	December 8, 1979	Howard Hesseman	
5	April 19, 1980	Strother Martin	
5	May 24, 1980	Buck Henry	

== Telepsychic ==
Telepsychic was a sketch that only appeared twice, and opened the show both times. featuring Dan Aykroyd as Ray, a pseudopsychic with his own TV show. For the character, Aykroyd wore a blonde wig and tinted sunglasses, and sat behind a desk with five telephones on it. Callers asked for advice about personal issues, and his flippant delivery and outrageous suggestions while answering phones are indicative that he was a fraud. In response to a series of questions that involved time spans, his answer for each was, "Ohhhh... about a month."

=== Episodes featuring Telepsychic ===
- December 9, 1978 host: Eric Idle
- May 19, 1979 host: Maureen Stapleton

== Candy Slice ==
Candy Slice was a character played by Gilda Radner on Saturday Night Live. An intense but troubled rock and roll artist, Candy Slice recorded a track for an album in a sketch on December 9, 1978, in an installment Eric Idle hosted, the song being "If You Look Close (You Can See My Tits)."

She also performed in the Rock Against Yeast sketch on February 17, 1979, while Ricky Nelson was hosting. Her song was dedicated to Mick Jagger and was about how Candy Slice was his "biggest funked-up fan". Other musician impressions in the sketch included Olivia Newton-John (Laraine Newman), Bob Marley (Garrett Morris) and Dolly Parton (Jane Curtin).

Candy Slice was based loosely on punk rock pioneer Patti Smith.

=== Episodes featuring Candy Slice ===
- December 9, 1978 host: Eric Idle
- February 17, 1979 host: Ricky Nelson

== The Widettes ==
A Dan Aykroyd, John Belushi, Jane Curtin, and Gilda Radner sketch. Debuted December 16, 1978.

Appearances

Season	Episode	Host
4	December 16, 1978	Elliott Gould
4	February 10, 1979	Cicely Tyson
4	April 14, 1979	Milton Berle

== Miles Cowperthwaite ==
A Michael Palin sketch. Debuted January 27, 1979. The second appearance aired on May 12, 1979.

== Dick Lanky ==
A Bill Murray sketch. Debuted February 17, 1979.

== Rosa Santangelo ==
A Gilda Radner character, who appeared in three sketches over seasons 4 and 5. Debuted May 19, 1979.

Preceded by Recurring Saturday Night Live characters and sketches introduced 1977–1978	Recurring Saturday Night Live characters and sketches (listed chronologically)	Succeeded by Recurring Saturday Night Live characters and sketches introduced 1979–1980
