= Recurring Saturday Night Live characters and sketches introduced 1983–84 =

The following is a list of recurring Saturday Night Live characters and sketches introduced between October 8, 1983, and May 12, 1984, the ninth season of SNL.

== Dwight MacNamara ==
He was a narrator for educational films played by Gary Kroeger. At times, he would imitate the warbly sound of an incorrectly threaded film projector. Debuted November 12, 1983.

== Hello, Trudy! ==
A James Belushi and Julia Louis-Dreyfus sketch. Debuted December 10, 1983.

== El Dorko ==
A Gary Kroeger sketch. Debuted January 28, 1984.

== Worthington Clotman ==
An NBC censor played by Tim Kazurinsky. He was an uptight gentleman who wore a bow-tie and glasses. The character was based on the head NBC censor at the time, Bill Clotworthy. Debuted January 28, 1984.

== Wayne Huevos ==
Huevos was a suave albeit smarmy Latin-American businessman played by Tim Kazurinsky. He often appeared on "Saturday Night News" with ideas to clean up New York City. Debuted February 18, 1984.

Preceded by Recurring Saturday Night Live characters and sketches introduced 1982–83	Recurring Saturday Night Live characters and sketches (listed chronologically)	Succeeded by Recurring Saturday Night Live characters and sketches introduced 1984–85
