= Recurring Saturday Night Live characters and sketches introduced 1982–83 =

The following is a list of recurring Saturday Night Live characters and sketches introduced between September 25, 1982, and May 14, 1983, the eighth season of SNL.

== April May June ==
A Julia Louis-Dreyfus sketch. Debuted September 25, 1982

== Mrs. T. ==
A Robin Duke sketch. Debuted October 2, 1982

== Marvin & Celeste ==
A Tim Kazurinsky and Mary Gross sketch. Debuted October 2, 1982

Appearances

| Season | Episode | Host | Notes |
|---|---|---|---|
| 8 | October 2, 1982 | Louis Gossett Jr. | |
| 8 | October 23, 1982 | Howard Hessman | |
| 8 | February 19, 1983 | Howard Hessman | |

== Alfalfa ==
Mary Gross impersonates the Our Gang character of Alfalfa. Debuted November 13, 1982

== Havnagootiim Vishnuuerheer ==
A Tim Kazurinsky sketch. Debuted December 4, 1982

Saturday Night News Appearances

| Season | Episode | Host | Notes |
|---|---|---|---|
| 8 | December 4, 1982 | The Smothers Brothers | |
| 8 | January 22, 1983 | Lily Tomlin | |
| 8 | February 19, 1983 | Howard Hessman | |
| 8 | April 9, 1983 | Joan Rivers | |
| 8 | May 14, 1983 | Ed Koch | |

Unanswered Questions of the Universe

| Season | Episode | Host | Notes |
|---|---|---|---|
| 9 | November 5, 1983 | Betty Thomas | |
| 9 | December 10, 1983 | Flip Wilson | |
| 9 | March 17, 1984 | Billy Crystal | |
| 9 | May 5, 1984 | Barry Bostwick | |

== Dr. Ruth Westheimer ==
Mary Gross portrays Dr. Ruth Westheimer on Saturday Night News.

Appearances

| Season | Episode | Host | Notes |
|---|---|---|---|
| 8 | January 29, 1983 | Rick Moranis, Dave Thomas | |
| 8 | February 26, 1983 | Beau Bridges, Jeff Bridges | |
| 8 | April 16, 1983 | Susan Saint James | |
| 9 | October 15, 1983 | Danny DeVito, Rhea Perlman | |
| 9 | December 10, 1983 | Flip Wilson | |
| 9 | May 12, 1984 | Ed Koch, Betty Thomas, Father Guido Sarducci, Edwin Newman, Billy Crystal | |
| 10 | November 10, 1984 | Michael McKean | |

== Patti Lynn Hunnsacker ==
Patti Lynn Hunnsacker was Saturday Night News's teenage correspondent who complained about matters concerning adolescents, such as proms and dates. She was played by Julia Louis-Dreyfus. Debuted February 5, 1983.

Appearances

| Season | Episode | Host | Notes |
|---|---|---|---|
| 8 | February 5, 1983 | Sid Caesar | |
| 8 | March 19, 1983 | Robert Guillaume | |
| 8 | May 14, 1983 | Ed Koch | |

== Dion's Hairstyling ==
An Eddie Murphy and Joe Piscopo sketch.

Appearances

| Season | Episode | Host | Notes |
|---|---|---|---|
| 8 | February 19, 1983 | Howard Hessman | |
| 8 | May 7, 1983 | Stevie Wonder | |
| 9 | November 12, 1983 | Teri Garr | Taped September 1983 |
| 9 | December 10, 1983 | Flip Wilson | |
| 9 | February 25, 1984 | Edwin Newman | |

| Preceded by Recurring Saturday Night Live characters and sketches introduced 1981–82 | Recurring Saturday Night Live characters and sketches (listed chronologically) | Succeeded by Recurring Saturday Night Live characters and sketches introduced 1983–84 |
