= Recurring Saturday Night Live characters and sketches introduced 2002–03 =

The following is a list of recurring Saturday Night Live characters and sketches introduced between October 5, 2002, and May 17, 2003, the twenty-eighth season of SNL.

== Fericito ==
Fericito is a character played by Fred Armisen. A Venezuelan nightclub comedian, he premiered in the October 5, 2002 episode in Weekend Update. He has appeared on SNL seven times so far, most notably on ¡Show Biz Grande Explosion!, a sketch vehicle launched to feature his character. Prior to this, he appeared on an episode of Late World with Zach. His catchphrases were "¡Ay Dios Mio!" and "I'm just keeding!" Debuted October 5, 2002.

== Merv the Perv ==
Merv the Perv, real name Mervin Watson, was a perverted man played by Chris Parnell. The sketch debuted October 12, 2002. Merv usually shows up at places where there are likely to be a lot of women, like a Victoria's Secret store, or an office party. Once there, he tries to seduce the women, using admittedly raunchy puns without any luck. He is usually resigned to the hopelessness of scoring girls, but enjoys their reactions to his lewdness nonetheless. The sketch usually ends with Merv, seeing his presence is unwanted, saying, "I guess I'll take off... my pants!", upon which he removes his tear-off pants, to which the girls exclaim, "Oh, Merv!" To which Merv replies in a smarmy voice, "That's Merv the Perv."

- Merv has a brother named "Irv the Perv" (played by Johnny Knoxville when he hosted in season 30) who (supposedly) worked at Victoria's Secret. This character behaves in the same way as Merv, but the women he hits on welcome his comments while still rejecting Merv's.
- Similarly, Merv has a cousin named "Steve the Skeeve", played by Colin Farrell. Likewise, because of his accent, Steve's perverted comments are welcome, unlike Merv's.
- Has a brother-in-law who's a gynecologist (played by tennis player Andy Roddick when Roddick hosted in Season 29).

== Tim Calhoun ==
Tim "Boo" Calhoun (Will Forte) has made nine appearances between 2002 and 2008, eight of which were on Weekend Update. Calhoun is a soft-spoken political candidate with slicked-back hair, a slight Southern drawl, and many unconventional ideas ("America needs another big lake!"). Calhoun is also a career criminal with many arrests, which he often inadvertently mentions. Constantly nervous and fidgety, Calhoun reads his speeches from index cards which he stacks neatly on the table as he finishes each one. Usually the final word of his statement is on a separate card. His voice is exaggeratedly slow and deliberate, hardly rising above a whisper. When talking, he moves his extended index and middle fingers up and down.

An Independent, he first appeared on Weekend Update under the equal-time rule when John McCain hosted on October 19, 2002.

== Top o' the Morning ==
Top o' the Morning, starring Seth Meyers and Jimmy Fallon, was about an Irish morning talk show that takes place at a bar with hosts William Fitzpatrick and Patrick Fitzwilliam. Guests included Dan Aykroyd as Willam's father Patrick Fitzpatrick, and Senator John McCain as Frank McCourt. A recurring bit is where William will say something to Patrick to make him punch the wall.

Example (from the March 15, 2003 episode hosted by Salma Hayek):

William Fitzpatrick: So, Patrick.. your sister sure is stubborn, is she not?

Patrick Fitzwilliam: And what do you mean by that?

William Fitzpatrick: I had to ask her to take off her knickers four times before she did it!

Patrick Fitzwilliam: (angry) That's my sister!! (Punches a hole in the wall)

William Fitzpatrick: (impressed) Good. Well done.

Debuted October 19, 2002.

== Z105 with Joey Mack ==
A Jimmy Fallon sketch. Debuted November 2, 2002. Fallon plays Joey Mack, an obnoxious radio DJ who has special guests on his show, but almost never lets them talk on air because he is too preoccupied with his own comic voices.

== Baby K ==
A Jeff Richards sketch. Debuted November 2, 2002.

== The Falconer ==
"The Falconer" is a recurring Saturday Night Live sketch chronicling the adventures of former businessman Ken Mortimer (Will Forte), who left his job to become a hermit, living in the forest with his trusted pet falcon, Donald. The Falconer, who speaks in a loud, strident voice, routinely encounters trouble and sends his falcon to get help, who—in turn—often gets sidetracked along the way. One such adventure features Donald immersing himself in the modern society which Ken had rejected, wantonly indulging in every imaginable vice before returning to the forgiving Falconer. Another involves the death of Donald and Ken's quest to save his life through time travel. The original sketch is written and created by comedian Leo Allen.

=== Episodes featuring The Falconer ===
- November 9, 2002 host: Nia Vardalos
- January 18, 2003 host: Ray Liotta
- May 3, 2003 host: Ashton Kutcher
- May 17, 2003 host: Dan Aykroyd
- November 15, 2003 host: Alec Baldwin
- November 20, 2004 host: Luke Wilson
- April 16, 2005 host: Tom Brady
- November 12, 2005 host: Jason Lee
- May 20, 2006 host: Kevin Spacey

A Falconer sketch where The Falconer discovers that Donald the falcon is a fake and The Falconer's life is just a recurring sketch on Saturday Night Live was performed in the dress rehearsal episode of the Rainn Wilson/Arcade Fire episode, but not shown in the live show.

== Glenda Goodwin ==
A Maya Rudolph sketch. Debuted November 9, 2002.

== Tennis Talk with Time Traveling Scott Joplin ==
A Maya Rudolph sketch. Debuted November 16, 2002.

In this sketch, Maya Rudolph portrays "Time Traveling Scott Joplin", who travels through time just to interview tennis stars. He shoots bad zinger insults at the tennis stars and punctuates them with a ragtime style sting on the piano.

=== Appearances ===
- Nov. 16, 2002: Host Brittany Murphy as Anna Kournikova, Dean Edwards as Serena Williams, Tracy Morgan as Venus Williams.
- Nov. 8, 2003: Host Andy Roddick as present day Andre Agassi, Seth Meyers as Andre Agassi from 1992 (fetched from that year by Joplin) and Will Forte as Andre Agassi from the future.

== Rialto Grande ==
A Chris Kattan and Fred Armisen sketch. Debuted January 18, 2003. Kattan plays Buddy Mills, a washed up, aging stand up comedian performing in a similarly washed up divey Las Vegas club. Most of his not-particularly-funny jokes revolve around his age and his enlarged prostate. A running gag in the sketches is that Mills will tell a corny joke followed by a melodramatic sweeping cue to his elderly drummer, Mackey, played by Armisen, to provide a sting. Mackey will simply sit there, staring into space, prompting Mills to give up on the sting, only to have Mackey abruptly become alert some time later and provide an embarrassingly ill-timed sting as Mills is discussing something serious, such as asking for prayers following a tragedy, or confiding some troubling secret in his life to the audience.

Throughout each sketch, aging cocktail waitresses (Rachel Dratch, Tina Fey, Maya Rudolph, Amy Poehler) pass zombie-like between Mills and the camera.

=== Appearances ===
- January 18, 2003: Host Ray Liotta.
- February 22, 2003: Host Christopher Walken.
- April 12, 2003: Host Ray Romano.
- May 17, 2003: Host Dan Aykroyd.
- December 13, 2003: Host Elijah Wood.

== Club Traxx ==
A Maya Rudolph and Fred Armisen sketch. Debuted February 8, 2003. Club Traxx is a Eurovision-like music TV show where hosts Beertje Van Beers (Rudolph) and Leonard (Armisen) interview musical guests and count down the top European music videos.

=== Appearances ===
- February 8, 2003: Eurotrash singer Chrome (host Matthew McConaughey) premieres his music video "Everybody (Wow!)". Audience members voice their anti-Iraq War sentiments.
- April 12, 2003: Iraqi pop sensation Youseffi (host Ray Romano) performs one of his hit songs.
- May 1, 2004. Musical duo D.A.D.I. (played by Rachel Dratch and host Lindsay Lohan) perform their song "We're on the Run". D.A.D.I. are in a faux-lesbian relationship intended to sell more records, which is a reference to Russian musical duo T.A.T.u.

== The Kelly Brothers ==
Gunther Kelly (Fred Armisen) and his brother Patrick (Will Forte) appear as experts from an impressive institution or think-tank. Called on to discuss or debate complex topics (such as tax codes or immigration), they tell the audience that they will present their information in a song, so the nuances can be better absorbed. However, their songs, while snappy and possessing humorous two-part harmonies in counterpoint, are repetitive, usually contain nothing but nonsense lyrics, and impart no information whatsoever. Debuted February 8, 2003.

On the May 6, 2006 show with Tom Hanks and Red Hot Chili Peppers, the Kelly brothers appeared on Weekend Update (their usual domain) for a debate which turned out to be them simply singing, "Ya." over and over. Patrick sang in an exaggeratedly high tone, while Gunther sang in a low tone, presumably to illustrate opposing viewpoints.

== Pranksters ==
A Seth Meyers sketch, concerning a show showcasing viewer-made and filmed practical jokes, where a certain guest's prank turns out to be a murder.

Appearances:

- February 22, 2003: host Christopher Walken as a man who killed a co-worker who stole his parking spot with a tire iron.
- December 18, 2004: host Robert De Niro as a man who killed a neighbor who did not return his tools with a chainsaw.

== Don's Apothecary ==
A Horatio Sanz sketch. Debuted March 8, 2003.

== Adult Students ==
A Tracy Morgan, Fred Armisen, Rachel Dratch and Horatio Sanz sketch. Morgan, Armisen, Dratch, and Sanz play adults who take classes usually taken by people their age (e.g., a cooking class), but each of them seems to have a different problem with the class. Sanz's character (named Vasquez Gomez-Vasquez) had appeared before these sketches and would continue to appear in sketches until his tenure ended. Debuted March 15, 2003.

Preceded by Recurring Saturday Night Live characters and sketches introduced 2001–02	Recurring Saturday Night Live characters and sketches (listed chronologically)	Succeeded by Recurring Saturday Night Live characters and sketches introduced 2003–04
