= Recurring Saturday Night Live characters and sketches introduced 1999–2000 =

The following is a list of recurring Saturday Night Live characters and sketches introduced between September 25, 1999, and May 20, 2000, the twenty-fifth season of SNL.

== The Boston Teens ==
A Jimmy Fallon and Rachel Dratch sketch. Debuted November 13, 1999.

== Nadeen ==
A Cheri Oteri sketch. Debuted November 13, 1999. Nadeen would appear as a service employee of some sort (a hospital admitting nurse, a fast food counter clerk, etc.). Her catchphrase was "Simmah down now!" However, Nadeen was always by far the most wound up and hyper character in the sketch, the one most in need of "simmering down".

Appearances:

- Season 25, Episode 5 (November 13, 1999): Host Garth Brooks. Nadeen works the returns counter at a department store. In the next sketch that week (which details a news team devising a kiddie, Zoom-like intro for their show), Tim Meadows references this sketch by telling the riled-up news crew "Alright, everybody, simmah down now."
- Season 25, Episode 12 (February 12, 2000): Host Julianna Margulies. Nadeen works as an emergency room admitting nurse.
- Season 25, Episode 17 (April 15, 2000): Host Tobey Maguire. Nadeen works at a fast food counter.

== Nick Burns, Your Company's Computer Guy ==
A Jimmy Fallon sketch. Debuted November 20, 1999. Nick Burns (Fallon) looked like an archetypal nerd (dirty unkempt hair, pagers, pocket protector, etc.) and was an IT Support guy at a large company. He would nastily mock anyone who asked for his assistance in fixing a problem with their computer. His catchphrases were a sarcastic "And by the way... YOU'RE WELCOME", a loud, obnoxious "MOVE!!", commanding the person asking for his help to get out of their desk chair so he could sit in it to fix the problem with their computer, and "Was that so hard?"

- Season 25, Episode 6 (November 20, 1999): with Jennifer Aniston
- Season 25, Episode 9 (January 8, 2000): with Jamie Foxx
- Season 25, Episode 20 (May 20, 2000): with Jackie Chan
- Season 26, Episode 5 (November 11, 2000): Host Calista Flockhart played a new IT Support employee who was essentially a female version of Nick Burns. By the end of the sketch, she and Nick had taken strong romantic interest in each other.
- Season 27, Episode 6 (November 17, 2001): Host Billy Bob Thornton played Nick Burns' father, essentially an older version of him.

== Jacob Silj ==
Jacob Silj is a Will Ferrell character who suffers from 'Voice Immodulation Syndrome', a disease which makes him unable to control the volume or inflection of his voice. Silj begins each segment by attempting to offer serious commentary on a current event, but inevitably gets interrupted by the Weekend Update anchor, who can't stand his loud, relentless monotone. Silj then begins to lecture the anchor about Voice Immodulation Syndrome, and describe situations that make the disease particularly unbearable (like praying in church, or soothing a baby to sleep). Silj has variously stated that the disease affects 700 or 6 people each year, or "over zero people in the United States alone", and is apparently caused by a late birth and exposure to gold dust. The character debuted December 4, 1999.

Appearances:

- Season 25, Episode 7 (December 4, 1999): Host Christina Ricci. Appeared on Weekend Update with correspondent Colin Quinn.
- Season 25, Episode 16 (April 8, 2000): Host Christopher Walken. Appeared on Weekend Update with correspondent Colin Quinn.
- Season 26, Episode 10 (January 20, 2001): Host Mena Suvari. Appeared on Weekend Update with correspondents Jimmy Fallon and Tina Fey.
- Season 26, Episode 17 (April 14, 2001): Host Renee Zellweger. Appeared on Weekend Update with correspondents Jimmy Fallon and Tina Fey.
- Season 43, Episode 12 (January 27, 2018): Host Will Ferrell. Appeared on Weekend Update with correspondents Colin Jost and Michael Che.

== Sally O'Malley ==
Molly Shannon portrayed Sally O'Malley, a proud 50-year-old woman sporting a red jump-suit and bouffant hairstyle. Her catchphrase was, "I like to kick, and stretch and KICK!! I'm 50!!" Her common action was to pull her pants up high, and then kick and stretch energetically. She believed herself to be an extraordinarily youthful 50, and although energetic and spunky, in many ways, especially her physical appearance, she was an archetypal middle-aged woman. In each sketch, she was auditioning or interviewing for a job that was looking for a much younger woman, but she would always end up getting the job.

Appearances:

- December 11, 1999: Host Danny DeVito. Sally auditions for The Rockettes, overdoing her kicking.
- February 19, 2000: Host Ben Affleck. Sally enrolls in the police academy.
- April 8, 2000: Host Christopher Walken. Sally wins a beauty contest.
- February 17, 2001: Host Sean Hayes. Sally talks her way into a fashion show as a runway model.
- May 12, 2007: Host Molly Shannon. In this installment of the sketch, which takes place in the world depicted on The Sopranos, Sally gets hired as a stripper at Bada Bing!.
- May 8, 2010: Host Betty White. Sally meets a similarly spunky woman (White) who's obsessed with the fact that she's 90 years old. She has her own catch phrase: "I like to stand (she stands), and bend (she bends slightly at the waist), and sit! (She sits back down, having had enough activity for the moment.) I'm 90!"
- April 8, 2023: Host Molly Shannon. The Jonas Brothers decide to switch things up by hiring Sally O'Malley.
- February 16, 2025: Saturday Night Live 50th Anniversary Special. Sally and Emma Stone introduce a montage of physical comedy sketches.

== Jasper Hahn ==
Portrayed by Horatio Sanz, Jasper Hahn was touted as an illustrator for children's books. During his appearance, he would begin drawing what would initially be perceived as something phallic. Colin Quinn, and later Jimmy Fallon, would bristle and try to stop him, but the drawing would usually end up as a moose (who is described, in an innuendo, as liking to go "deep in the forest") or other animal with a phallic-shaped nose or proboscis. Debuted January 8, 2000.

== Dr. Beaman ==
A Will Ferrell sketch, written by Ferrell and Adam McKay. Dr. Beaman (Ferrell) is an eccentric doctor who is rude to his patients and says nonsensical things. He speaks to couples who are expecting or who have just become new parents. Dr. Beaman habitually ignores his patients to obnoxiously talk on the phone with his friend Beverly, says negative things about his patients as if they cannot hear him, and shows a genuine distaste for his profession.

Season 25, Episode 10 (January 15, 2000): Dr. Beaman meets with Tom (Chris Parnell) and Kathy Framingham (Molly Shannon), who recently gave birth to a baby boy and are there for his test results. Rachel Dratch plays the balding nurse Jennifer, and Dratch is wearing the same wig she wore in the earlier Models sketch of that night. Beaman does everything except tell the Framinghams the results, from mixing the couple up with other patients and ignoring them to take phone calls. He gives increasingly worrying updates, such as "Your father may never again have a human face" and "Your son's a witch."

Beaman sends in Dr. Steven Poop (Tim Meadows), claiming he is the only one who can save the baby's life. When Dr. Poop comes in, he tells the couple, "I'm sorry, there's absolutely nothing I can do for your son. But.. I can do The Robot. [does the Robot dance] That'll be $5,000. Good day to you both." As Meadows does the Robot dance, Shannon tries to hold in her laughter. Ferrell comes close to breaking character; it is the closest he's ever come to breaking on the show. Parnell is the only one not to break. In the dress rehearsal version of the sketch, Dr. Poop was played by guest host Freddie Prinze Jr. Beaman finally admits he misplaced the couple's baby at a BoDeans concert but after retrieving him the next day at lost and found, he just "flat out lost him". After Tom angrily calls Dr. Beaman a "vondruke" he forgives him because he is a "straight shooter", then tells his shocked wife that they can just make another baby.

Season 26, Episode 17 (April 14, 2001): Dr. Beaman sees two couples. Molly Shannon, who had left the cast two months earlier, makes her first cameo appearance as a nurse. Beaman refers to Shannon by her actual name. The first patients are expecting parents (Maya Rudolph and Darrell Hammond) who want to opt for a natural birth. Beaman says he would've thought the couple would go for a drug-assisted delivery because they look like "dopeheads", angering the couple. He continues to weird them out with his odd behavior and makes them leave.

His next patients are the Daberhoffs (Renée Zellweger and Jimmy Fallon), another expecting couple. After prolonged tangents where he does not help the couple, Beaman finally claims that Mrs. Daberhoff is not actually pregnant, and that the heartbeat she supposedly heard during the ultrasound was in fact the bass drum from a Toto cover band in the neighboring room. Fallon breaks character when Beaman yells at him. Nevertheless, Mrs. Daberhoff's water breaks. Instead of helping her, Beaman goes into hysterics and panics. The nurse arrives to aid the couple, and once they leave, Beaman closes his office door shut, letting out a sigh of relief at not having to deal with patients.

== Joy Lipton ==
Played by Cheri Oteri, Lipton is the owner of The Erotic Attic boutique with a quavering voice and glasses. Appeared in the Weekend Update segment, Lipton promotes erotic material she created while giving advice on how to use them. She usually talks to the anchor ("Hey Colin!") rather than the audience, takes off her dress at the end of each sketch to unveil an erotic cloth underneath and then lies down the anchor's desk.

- Season 25, episode 12: Host Julianna Margulies - February 12, 2000. Lipton gives Valentine’s Day gift hints.
- Season 25, episode 17: Host Tobey Maguire - April 15, 2000. Lipton shows some of her own creations, regarding National Lingerie Week

== The Bloater Brothers ==
The Bloater brothers, Kip (Fallon) and Wayne (Chris Parnell), make obnoxious jokes, no matter what situation, and laughing incessantly at themselves. Their laughter is characteristically low-key and sounds extremely forced. They usually go back and forth, taking turns making jokes, which are generally little more than puns or comic references based on whatever situation they are in, much to the chagrin of whoever happens to be listening to them. They often try to pick up women, but they appear to be uncomfortable and their constant joking usually gets in the way. The more uneasy they appear to be, the more they joke and laugh. When thoroughly defeated, they occasionally go back and forth between crying and laughing (apparently at nothing). In one sketch, their father, Kurt Bloater (played by Jon Stewart), appears and exhibits behavior just like the two.

== Woodrow the Homeless Man ==
A Tracy Morgan sketch. Debuted May 13, 2000. This sketch always aired on episodes hosted by attractive, young female celebrities. Tracy Morgan played Woodrow, a homeless man who lived in the sewer, was filthy, smelled terrible, and was psychotically disconnected from reality in disturbing ways. The theme of the sketches was that the host of the episode (always playing herself, not an impression of someone else or a fictional character) would be oblivious to his filth and psychosis and fall in love with him.

Morgan reprises his role as Woodrow on the October 17, 2015 episode on which he hosted, serving as a life coach for Weekend Update character Willie.

Appearances:

- Season 25, Episode 19 (May 13, 2000): with Britney Spears as herself
- Season 26, Episode 2 (October 14, 2000): with Kate Hudson as herself
- Season 41, Episode 3 (October 17, 2015): host Tracy Morgan

Preceded by Recurring Saturday Night Live characters and sketches introduced 1998–1999	Recurring Saturday Night Live characters and sketches (listed chronologically)	Succeeded by Recurring Saturday Night Live characters and sketches introduced 2000–2001
