= List of recurring Saturday Night Live characters and sketches by cast member =

The following are the most frequent recurring characters and celebrity impressions on Saturday Night Live listed by cast member. For the 70th Emmy Awards, Saturday Night Live received 22 nominations and won nine awards.

== A ==
=== Fred Armisen ===
- Barack Obama
- Billiam, from Gays in Space (2005–06)
- Billy Smith (2003–04)
- David Paterson
- Fericito, often featured in ¡Show Biz Grande Explosion! (2002–05)
- Frondi, a man who says whatever is on his mind
- Gabe Fisher, a member of the Adult Students (2003)
- Garth, of holiday singing duo Garth & Kat (2009–15)
- Gunther Kelly, one of The Kelly Brothers (2003–06)
- Henry Quincy Lundford of The Lundford Twins Feel Good Variety Hour (2005)
- Leonard, co-host of Club Traxx (2003-04)
- Mackey, the elderly drummer from Rialto Grande (2003)
- Nicholas Fehn, a political comedian who never has a point (2007–12)
- Nuni Schoener (2005–07)
- One of the "Two Gay Guys from..." (2006–12)
- Prince (2004–12)
- Roger Brush, a women's advice talk show producer who often fills in for the female host and ends up giving bad advice (2009–12)
- Steve Jobs
- Willie Tater from Appalachian Emergency Room (2004)
- Randy Newman
- Stuart from The Californians

=== Dan Aykroyd ===
- Beldar Conehead (1977–79)
- Bob Dole
- Bob Widette (1978)
- E. Buzz Miller (1977)
- Elwood Blues of The Blues Brothers (1976–78)
- Floyd Hunger, from The Mall sketches
- Fred Garvin, Male Prostitute
- George, one of the cooks at Olympia Cafe
- Irwin Mainway from Consumer Probe and other sketches (1976–)
- Jack Neehauser from St. Mickey's Knights of Columbus (1978)
- Jimmy Carter (1977–79)
- Jimmy Joe Red Sky, from Nick The Lounge Singer sketches
- Joe, one of The Ex-Police
- Julia Child
- Leonard Pinth-Garnell (1977–79)
- Mel of Mel's Char Palace (1975)
- Mike Mendoza
- Ray the Telepsychic
- Richard Nixon (1975–79)
- Robert Stack
- Rod Serling
- Sheriff Brady, in the Land Shark sketches
- Tom Snyder
- Vincent Price
- Yortuk Festrunck (1977)

== B ==
=== Vanessa Bayer ===
- Jacob the Bar Mitzvah Boy
- Hillary Clinton
- Kourtney Kardashian
- Miley Cyrus
- Miss Meadows
- Rachel Green
- Rebecca Stern-Markowitz-san from J-Pop America Fun Time Now (2011)
- Totino's lady

=== Jim Belushi ===
- Captain Kangaroo
- Hank Rippy, host of Hello Trudy! (1983)
- Jesse Donnelly
- That White Guy (1985)

=== John Belushi ===
- Elizabeth Taylor
- Frank Leary, from St. Mickey's Knights of Columbus (1978)
- Fred Silverman
- Henry Kissinger
- Jake Blues of The Blues Brothers (1976–78)
- Jeff Widette (1978)
- Joe Cocker
- Kevin from The Mall sketches
- Kuldroth from Coneheads sketches
- Larry Farber
- Lowell Brock from H & L Brock (1976)
- Marlon Brando
- Matt Hooper, in the Land Shark sketches
- Pete, owner of the Olympia Cafe
- Samurai Futaba (1976–79)
- Steve Bushakis (1976)
- The Hulk
- Truman Capote

=== Beck Bennett ===
- Mike Pence
- Vladimir Putin
- Jules, Who Sees Things a Little Differently, on Weekend Update
- Casey from Inside SoCal
- Jake Tapper
- Mitch McConnell

=== Jim Breuer ===
- Don Wong of Wong & Owens, Ex-Porn Stars (1997)
- Glenn, the jock brother of Azrael Abyss on Goth Talk
- Goat Boy (1996)
- Gunner Olsen, heavy metal singer (1998)
- Jeffrey Kaufman, host of Issues with Jeffrey Kaufman (1997)
- Jim Lehrer
- Joe Pesci
- Joe Jr., son of Joe Blow (1995)

=== Paul Brittain ===
- Harry Reid
- Johnny Depp
- James Franco
- "Sex" Ed Vincent
- Lord Wyndemere

=== A. Whitney Brown ===
- Host of The Big Picture on Weekend Update
- Ed Jaymes

=== Aidy Bryant ===
- Chubbina Fatzarelli of Dyke and Fats
- William Barr
- Sarah Huckabee Sanders
- Ted Cruz
- Morgan on Girlfriends Talk Show
- Travel expert Carrie Krum on Weekend Update

== C ==
=== Beth Cahill ===
- Denise Swerski, daughter of Bob Swerski in Bill Swerski's Superfans (1991)
- Marcia Brady
- Pam, of the Delta Delta Delta sorority (1992)

=== Dana Carvey ===
- The Church Lady (1986–2011)
- A Grumpy Old Man (1989)
- Bob Dylan
- Buddy Precisely, the snobby Maitre'D in Celebrity Restaurant (1988)
- Casey Kasem
- Ching Chang (1986)
- Chris, Pat's love interest
- Dennis Miller
- Derek Stevens (1986)
- Garth Algar from Wayne's World (1988–2015)
- George F. Will
- George H. W. Bush (1989–93)
- George Michael
- Hans (1987)
- Johnny Carson
- Jimmy Stewart
- Lane Maxwell
- Larry Roman (1990)
- Lyle Billup, the Effeminate Heterosexual (1989)
- Lyle Clark from Toonces the Driving Cat (1989)
- Marco, one of The Kitchen Boys
- Massive Headwound Harry
- Mickey Rooney
- Mishu from Miss Connie's Fable Nook (1986)
- One of the Elevator Fans (1991)
- One of the Two Sammies (1986)
- Paul McCartney
- Regis Philbin
- Robin Leach
- Ross Perot
- Strom Thurmond
- Ted Koppel
- Tom Brokaw

=== Chevy Chase ===
- Gregg Allman
- Gerald Ford (1975–76)
- Land Shark (1975–82)
- Leonard Nimoy

=== Ellen Cleghorne ===
- Jackée Harry
- Joycelyn Elders
- Pop's Daughter, in Tales From The Barbecue (1991)
- Queen Shenequa (1991)
- Robin Quivers
- Tina Turner
- Whoopi Goldberg
- Zoraida the NBC Page

=== Billy Crystal ===
- Buddy Young Jr. (1984)
- Fernando of Fernando's Hideaway (1984)
- Joe Franklin
- Lew Goldman (1984)
- Ricky of Ricky & Phil (1985)
- Sammy Davis Jr.
- Willie of Willie & Frankie (1984)

=== Jane Curtin ===
- Barbara, friend of Rhonda Weiss (1977)
- Betty Ford
- Betty Widette (1978)
- Enid Loopner, Lisa Loopner's mother (1979)
- Iris de Flaminio (1980)
- Joan Face, Heavy Sarcasm sketch (1979)
- Miss Hathaway from The Bel-Airabs (1979–80)
- Pat Nixon
- Prymaat Conehead (1977–79)

=== Joan Cusack ===
- Brooke Shields
- Salena of The Further Adventures of Biff and Salena (1986)

== D ==
=== Pete Davidson ===
- Chad
- Michael Avenatti

=== Tom Davis ===
- The Franken and Davis Show (1978)

=== Mikey Day ===
- Matt Schatt
- Donald Trump Jr.
- Joe Biden
- Prince Harry
- Josh from Science Room
- Supercentenarian Mort Fellner

=== Denny Dillon ===
- Amy Carter
- Debbie of Vickie & Debbie (1980)
- Mary Louise, a mentally disturbed child who talked to her sock puppet, Sam the Snake
- Pinky Waxman of The Waxmans
- Yoko Ono

=== Robert Downey Jr. ===
- Jimmy Chance, co-host of Actors on Film
- Rudy Randolph of The Rudy Randolphs (1985)

=== Rachel Dratch ===
- Abe Scheinwald (2003–05)
- Anne Robinson
- Debbie Downer (2005–20)
- Denise McDenna, one of the Boston Teens (1999–11)
- Elizabeth Taylor
- Harry Potter
- Julie, the lady who always speaks in the "Telephone Operator Voice"
- Loretta, leader of the "Space Lesbians" in Gays in Space
- Lynne Bershad from Delicious Dish (2000)
- Nicole, The Girl With No Gaydar
- One of the cocktail waitresses in Rialto Grande (2003)
- One of the dancers in The Lundford Twins Feel Good Variety Hour (2005)
- Phoebe of Phoebe and her Giant Pets (2004)
- Qrplt*xk, the drooling mutant with the baby arm growing from its head
- Ruth Weinstock, one of the Adult Students (2003)
- Sheldon from Wake Up Wakefield! (2001)
- Virginia Klarvin, one of The Lovers

=== Robin Duke ===
- Mrs. T (1982)
- Paulette Clooney (1981)
- Wendy Whiner (1982–84)

=== Nora Dunn ===
- Ashley Ashley (1986)
- Babette (1986)
- Denise Venetti, host of Learning To Feel (1988)
- Liz Sweeney, of The Sweeney Sisters (1986)
- Loose Chang, wife of Ching Chang (1986)
- Mrs. Campbell, Wayne Campbell's mom
- Pat Stevens (1985)

== E ==
=== Dean Edwards ===
- Don Cheadle
- Michael Jackson
- Chris Tucker
- Denzel Washington

=== Abby Elliott ===
- Anna Faris
- Sally Field
- Angelina Jolie
- Joan Cusack
- Khloé Kardashian
- Rachel Berry
- Meryl Streep
- Christina Aguilera
- Rachel Maddow
- Zooey Deschanel

=== Chris Elliott ===
- Chris Berman
- Yasser Arafat

== F ==
=== Jimmy Fallon ===
- Barry Gibb from The Barry Gibb Talk Show (2003–13)
- Jarret (2000–04)
- Joey Mack on Z105 (2002)
- Kip Bloater
- Nick Burns, Your Company's Computer Guy (1999–01)
- One of the Jeffrey's clerks (2001)
- Osama bin Laden
- Pat Sullivan, Recurring Saturday Night Live characters and sketches introduced 1999–2000 one of The Boston Teens (1999–11)
- Patrick Fitzwilliam, co-host of Top o' the Morning (2002)
- Randy Goldman from Wake Up Wakefield! (2001)
- Rodney "The Zipper" Calzoun from Rialto Grande (2003)
- Señor Galupe Juameras from The How Do You Say? Ah, Yes, Show (1998)
- The Leather Man (2002)
- Wade from 7 Degrees Celsius (1999)

=== Siobhan Fallon ===
- Meg, of the Delta Delta Delta sorority (1992)
- Christy, one of the co-workers in the Pat sketches (1994)
- Katharine Hepburn

=== Chris Farley ===
- B Fats, co-host of I'm Chillin' (1991)
- Bennett Brauer (1993)
- Beverly Gelfand from Zagat's
- Cindy Crawford, manager of The Gap
- Dom DeLuise
- Drinkin' Buddy, the sidekick of Middle-Aged Man (1990)
- Host of The Chris Farley Show (1991–93)
- Mark Strobel (1991)
- Matt Foley, Motivational Speaker (1993–97)
- Mr. O'Malley, friend of The Herlihy Boy (1993)
- Newt Gingrich
- One of the Hub's Gyros ("You like-a the juice?") guys (1993)
- Sandman from The Dark Side with Nat X
- Todd O'Connor, one of Bill Swerski's Superfans (1991–92)
- Tom Arnold
- Carnie Wilson
- Meat Loaf

=== Will Ferrell ===
- George W. Bush (2000–02)
- Alex Trebek from Celebrity Jeopardy! (1996–2015)
- Baron Nocturna from Goth Talk
- Craig from The Rocky Roads (1995)
- Craig Buchanan of The Spartan Cheerleaders (1995–99)
- David Larry, co-host of Dog Show (1998)
- Dr. Beaman a.k.a. the crazy doctor (2000)
- Frank Henderson a.k.a. the Get Off The Shed! guy (1995)
- Hank, one of the Bill Brasky guys (1996–2013)
- Harry Caray
- Jacob Silj (1999)
- James Lipton from Inside the Actors Studio
- Janet Reno, host of Janet Reno's Dance Party (1997–2001)
- The supervisor at Jeffrey's (2001)
- Leslie Attebury (1997)
- Marty Culp (1996–2015)
- Peter Tanner, manager of 7 Degrees Celsius (1999)
- Roger Klarvin, one of the Lovers (2001–03)
- Robert Goulet
- Saddam Hussein
- Don West, one of the Shopping at Home Network sports memorabilia guys
- Sean Patrick Flannery, a classmate of Mary Katherine Gallagher
- Spider from The Joe Pesci Show
- Steve Butabi, one of The Roxbury Guys (1996)
- Terrence Maddox, Nude Model (1998)
- Tom Wilkins, co-host of Morning Latte (1997)

=== Tina Fey ===
- One of the cocktail waitresses in Rialto Grande (2003)
- One of the dancers in The Lundford Twins Feel Good Variety Hour (2005)
- One of the Space Lesbians in Gays in Space
- Sarah Palin (2008)

=== Chloe Fineman ===
- Britney Spears
- Jennifer Coolidge
- Nicole Kidman
- Marianne Williamson
- Lauren Boebert
- JoJo Siwa
- Timotheé Chalamet

=== Will Forte ===
- Announcer on What Up With That? (2009–10)
- Brian Williams
- Daryl Hall
- George W. Bush (2004–06)
- Gilly's teacher
- Greg Stink, ESPN Color Commentator (2009–15)
- Harry Reid
- Jeff Montgomery, a very polite convicted sex offender (2008)
- John Edwards
- MacGruber (2007–10)
- One of the dancers in The Lundford Twins Feel Good Variety Hour (2005)
- One of the members of "Jon Bovi" (2006–09)
- Patrick Kelly, one of The Kelly Brothers (2003–06)
- The Falconer
- Tim Calhoun (2002–08)
- Tim Geithner
- Zell Miller

=== Al Franken ===
- Al Franken : Social Sciences Editor of Weekend Update
- Al Goldstein
- Henry Kissinger
- Lyndon LaRouche
- One-Man Mobile Uplink Reporter
- Pat Robertson
- Paul Tsongas
- Stuart Smalley (1991)
- The Franken and Davis Show (1978)
- Senator Paul Simon

== G ==
=== Heidi Gardner ===
- Angel, Every Boxer's Girlfriend from Every Movie About Boxing Ever
- Bailey Gismert, a teen film critic on Weekend Update
- Baskin Johns, a Goop staffer
- Brie Bacardi
- Deidre
- Jill Biden

=== Janeane Garofalo ===
- Hillary Clinton
- Jackie Stallone
- Martha Stewart

=== Ana Gasteyer ===
- Bobbi Mohan-Culp (1996–2015)
- Celine Dion
- Cinder Calhoun (1996)
- Elizabeth Dole
- Helen Thomas
- Joan Rivers
- Joy Behar
- Deana Nolan-Gray, host of Hello Dolly
- Gayle Gleason, host of Pretty Living (1998)
- Ginger Attebury (1997)
- Gladys Stubbs from Tiger Beat's Ultra Super Duper Dreamy Love Show (1998)
- Jonette from Gemini's Twin (2000)
- Kincaid (1996)
- Margaret Jo McCullin, cohost of Delicious Dish (1996)
- Mary Faye, one of the Southern Gals (1997)
- Sally Jessy Raphael
- Martha Stewart
- Allison Janney as C. J. Cregg on The West Wing

=== Gilbert Gottfried ===
- Leo Waxman, Pinky Waxman's husband on What's It All About?

=== Mary Gross ===
- Celeste (1982)
- Pee-wee Herman
- Dr. Ruth Westheimer
- Alfalfa, of The Little Rascals
- Chi Chi, of Chi Chi & Consuela (1984)

=== Christopher Guest ===
- Frankie, of Willie & Frankie (1984)
- Herb Minkman
- Rajeev Vindaloo (1984)
- Alan Barrows, one of The Folksmen (1984)
- Tippi Turtle (1984)

== H ==
=== Bill Hader ===
- Stefon
- Al Pacino
- James Carville
- Gizmo/Gremlins
- Eliot Spitzer
- Willem Dafoe
- Alan Alda
- Keith Morrison
- Vincent Price
- Daniel Day-Lewis
- Clint Eastwood
- John Mark Karr
- Lindsey Buckingham
- Julian Assange
- Michael Richards
- Eddie Vedder
- Peter O'Toole
- Mike The Situation
- Dwayne Vogelcheck
- Greg the Alien on Game Time with Randy and Greg
- One of the Gay Guys from New Jersey (2008–09)
- Vinny Vedecci, the host of La Revista Di La Television Con Vinny Vedecci (2008–10)
- Nitro from Laser cats (2006)
- David Bowie
- Charlie Sheen
- Herb Welch (2010–14)
- War vet Anthony Peter Coleman in the Puppet Class sketches
- Devin from The Californians (with Fred Armisen, Kristen Wiig and Vanessa Bayer)

=== Anthony Michael Hall ===
- Craig Sundberg, Idiot Savant, a 15-year-old genius who was intellectually disabled
- Fed Jones, one half of The Jones Brothers (the other brother named Ned Jones was played by Damon Wayans), two criminals who sell stolen items such as radios, bikes, purses, computers, and cable TV installation

=== Rich Hall ===
- Robert Latta
- David Byrne
- Doug Flutie
- Doug Henning
- Paul Harvey
- Host of the Saturday Night News Election Report

=== Darrell Hammond ===
- Bill Clinton (1995–2016)
- Jesse Jackson
- Donald Trump
- Phil Donahue
- Dick Cheney
- Chris Matthews
- John McCain
- Al Gore
- Jay Leno
- Jesse Helms
- Dan Rather
- Ted Koppel
- John Travolta
- Rudy Giuliani
- Tim Russert
- Donald Rumsfeld
- Geraldo Rivera
- Bill O'Reilly
- Sean Connery from Celebrity Jeopardy!
- Percy Bodance from Appalachian Emergency Room
- Regis Philbin
- William Shatner
- Arnold Schwarzenegger
- Uncle Frank, co-host of "The Local News with Joe Blow"
- Tarik Ozekial, co-host of The Ferey Muhtar Talk Show
- Skeeter, a redneck who randomly appears in certain situations

=== Phil Hartman ===
- Frankenstein's Monster
- Unfrozen Caveman Lawyer
- Chick Hazard, 1950s Private Investigator in The Jungle Room
- Russell Clark, host of Sassy's Sassiest Boys
- Beev Algar, father of Garth Algar on Wayne's World
- Eugene, host of Cooking with the Anal Retentive Chef
- Susan, the she-male in Sprockets
- Frank Sinatra
- Peter Graves
- Charlton Heston
- Donald Trump
- Jimmy Swaggart
- Jim Bakker
- James Stockdale
- Ronald Reagan (1986–89)
- Bill Clinton (1993–94)
- Ed McMahon
- Liberace
- Ted Kennedy
- Phil Donahue
- Jack Nicholson
- Burt Reynolds
- Pat Buchanan

=== Jan Hooks ===
- Nancy Reagan
- Kathie Lee Gifford
- Hillary Clinton
- Tammy Faye Bakker
- Sinéad O'Connor
- Marge Keister
- Miss Connie
- Nancy Simmons, in Wayne's World
- Candy Sweeney, of The Sweeney Sisters

=== Melanie Hutsell ===
- Jan Brady
- Tori Spelling
- Tonya Harding
- Di, of the Delta Delta Delta sorority

== J ==
=== Victoria Jackson ===
- Roseanne
- Cyndi Lauper
- Nancy Maloney, a nightclub singer

=== Colin Jost ===
- Pete Buttigieg

== K ==
=== Chris Kattan ===
- Kyle DeMarco from The DeMarco Brothers
- Mr. Peepers
- Buddy Mills, a washed-up Vegas comedian in Rialto Grande
- Antonio Banderas from The How Do You Say? Ah, Yes, Show.
- Mango
- Gay Hitler
- Al Pacino
- Andy Dick
- Steve Irwin
- Paul Begala
- Paul Shaffer
- Ricky Martin
- David Lee Roth
- Azrael Abyss, co-host of Goth Talk
- Josh Zimmerman from The Zimmermans, where he and Cheri Oteri played an inappropriately sexual married couple
- Eddy Lewis, one of the Shopping at Home Network sports memorabilia guys
- Gollum (from The Lord of the Rings)
- Doug Butabi from The Roxbury Guys
- Suel Forrester (a.k.a. "the gibberish guy")

=== Tim Kazurinsky ===
- Dr. Jack Badofsky
- Havnagootiim Vishnuuerheer
- Wayne Huevos
- Father Timothy Owens
- Worthington Clotman
- Husband in I Married A Monkey
- Mr. Landlord, in Mister Robinson's Neighborhood

=== Laura Kightlinger ===
- Connie Chung
- Marcia Clark

=== Taran Killam ===
- Michael Cera
- Gilbert Gottfried
- Pee-wee Herman
- Chris Pine
- Finn Hudson
- "What Up with That?" announcer
- Jonathan Cavanaugh-san, co-host of J-Pop America Fun Time Now
- Cory Chisholm, co-host of Right Side of the Bed!
- Brad Pitt
- Tom Brady
- Tim Tebow
- Eminem
- Piers Morgan
- Steve Doocy
- Martin O'Malley
- Paul Ryan
- John Boehner
- Ted Cruz
- Donald Trump
- François in Les Jeunes de Paris
- Todd Garnes in The Californians
- Jebidiah Atkinson (Weekend Update)

=== David Koechner ===
- Pat Buchanan
- Mike Ditka
- One of the Bill Brasky guys
- Gerald "T-Bones" Tibbons, a deranged redneck who takes on different odd jobs
- Gary Macdonald, the nervous joke-telling brother of Norm Macdonald
- Fagan of The British Fops
- Tom Taylor, neighbor who's always invited to Frank Henderson's (Will Ferrell) barbecues in the Get Off The Shed! sketches

=== Gary Kroeger ===
- El Dorko
- Dwight MacNamara
- Donny Osmond
- Paul Shaffer
- Walter Mondale

== L ==
=== Julia Louis-Dreyfus ===
- Marie Osmond
- Nina Blackwood
- Consuela, of Chi Chi & Consuela
- Yoko Ono

=== Jon Lovitz ===
- Tonto
- Hanukkah Harry
- Annoying Man
- Evelyn Quince
- Harvey Fierstein
- Master Thespian
- Mephistopheles
- Michael Dukakis
- One of The Girl Watchers
- Tommy Flanagan a.k.a. The Pathological Liar

== M ==
=== Norm Macdonald ===
- Burt Reynolds from Celebrity Jeopardy!
- Bob Dole
- Andy Rooney
- Charles Kuralt
- David Letterman
- Clint Eastwood
- Quentin Tarantino
- Dr. Jack Kevorkian
- Larry King
- Marv Albert
- Stan Hooper

=== Gail Matthius ===
- Valley Girl Vickie, an air-headed teenager who bothers others with her vacuous questions and statements

=== Michael McKean ===
- Bill Clinton (1994–95)
- Jerry Palter, one of The Folksmen
- Anthony, the weather guy on Good Morning Brooklyn
- Vincent Price
- Howard Stern

=== Mark McKinney ===
- Steve Forbes
- Paul Shaffer
- Jim Carrey
- Bill Gates
- One of the Bill Brasky guys
- Lucien of The British Fops
- Ian Daeglish, co-host of Scottish Soccer Hooligan Weekly

=== Kate McKinnon ===
- Justin Bieber
- Mary Berry
- Kate Bolduan
- Theresa Caputo
- Hillary Clinton
- Kellyanne Conway
- Penélope Cruz
- S.E. Cupp
- Ellen DeGeneres
- Jodie Foster
- Cecilia Gimenez
- Ruth Bader Ginsburg
- Kris Jenner
- Jane Lynch
- Angela Merkel
- Ann Romney
- Shakira
- Jeff Sessions
- Greta Van Susteren
- Tilda Swinton
- Keith Urban
- Elizabeth Warren
- Wilbur Ross
- Rudy Giuliani
- Jeff Sessions
- Nancy Pelosi
- Laura Ingraham
- Lindsey Graham
- Olya Povlatsky, a Russian woman who appears on Weekend Update, and voices her opinions on current events
- Colleen Rafferty, a woman who, along with Cecily Strong and the guest host, is describing extraordinary experiences.
- Sheila Sovage, a heavily intoxicated woman at a bar at last call
- Deenie, a.k.a. "Somebody's Mom"
- Barbara DeDrew, a lesbian volunteer at a Cat Shelter called Whiskers R We
- Mrs. Santini, an apartment dweller who writes passive-aggressive notes to her neighbors
- Debette Goldry

=== Tim Meadows ===
- O. J. Simpson
- Ike Turner
- Michael Jackson
- Oprah Winfrey
- Billy Dee Williams
- Sammy Davis Jr.
- David Dinkins
- Brad, one of The Rocky Roads
- Pimpin' Kyle, of Pimp Chat
- Pop, in Tales From the Barbecue
- G-Dog, rapper and star of "Princess and the Homeboy"
- Captain Jim, of Captain Jim and Pedro
- Leon Phelps, host of The Ladies Man
- Chris Garnett, host of The Quiet Storm
- Russell Johnson, of Russell & Tate
- Lionel Osbourne, host of Perspectives
- Jerry "Steve" Dave, The Magic Man
- One of the Bill Brasky guys

=== Seth Meyers ===
- Anderson Cooper
- Boston Powers from Catchphrase Comedy Tour
- Brad Scheinwald
- Brian Williams
- Carrot Top
- Dan Needler of The Couple That Should Be Divorced
- Dave "The Zinger" Clinger
- DJ Jonathan Feinstein
- Hugh Grant
- John Kerry
- Ian Gerrard, co-anchor of Spy Glass
- Nerod, the waiting room receptionist from Appalachian Emergency Room
- Ryan Seacrest
- Ty Pennington (of Extreme Makeover: Home Edition)
- William Fitzpatrick, co-host of Top o' The Morning

=== Dennis Miller ===
- Koko the French Clown, one of the pixies from Miss Connie's Fable Nook
- Steve, one of the Stand-Ups

=== Jerry Minor ===
- Al Sharpton
- Terrell, from the Jackie the security clerk sketches
- Grand Master Rap, co-host of Rap Street

=== Finesse Mitchell ===
- Stuart Scott
- Donovan McNabb
- Morgan Freeman
- Starkisha, a stereotypical black woman

=== Alex Moffat ===
- Anderson Cooper
- Eric Trump
- Chuck Schumer
- Prince William
- Guy Who Just Bought A Boat on Weekend Update
- Terry Fink, film critic

=== Jay Mohr ===
- Christopher Walken
- Andrew McCarthy
- Anthony Kiedis
- Billy Idol
- Dick Vitale
- Don Rickles
- Joe Perry
- Kenny G
- Mickey Rourke
- Ricki Lake
- Sean Penn
- Tony Bennett
- James Barone, host of Good Morning Brooklyn

=== Kyle Mooney ===
- Lincoln Chafee
- Criss Angel
- Tom Cotton
- Stand-up comic Bruce Chandling, appears on Weekend Update
- John Neely Kennedy
- Chris Fitzpatrick, a high school student and heavy metal enthusiast
- Todd from Inside SoCal

=== Tracy Morgan ===
- Brian Fellow
- Dominican Lou
- Astronaut Jones
- A.J., a member of the Adult Students
- Reggie Owens, of Wong & Owens, Ex-Porn Stars
- Tate Witherspoon, of Russell & Tate
- Woodrow the Homeless Man
- Al Sharpton
- Mike Tyson
- Star Jones
- Little Richard

=== Garrett Morris ===
- Chico Escuela, Latin Baseball Player
- Head master of the New York School for the hard of hearing on Weekend Update. Morris would just repeat what Chevy Chase said, but in a much louder voice.

=== Bobby Moynihan ===
- Guy Fieri
- Nathan Lane
- Snooki
- Ass Dan, of Kickspit Underground Festival
- Vinny Vedecci's son
- The "WHAAAAT!" microphone drop guy
- Liam, student in the Gilly sketches
- Anthony Crispino, the second-hand news reporter
- Mark Payne, the Uno's waiter/bartender
- Drunk Uncle, a character on Weekend Update who rambles on about various topics while intoxicated
- Chris Christie
- Sam Kinison
- Verne Troyer
- Newt Gingrich
- Sean Hannity
- Susan Boyle
- Rob Ford

=== Eddie Murphy ===
- Gumby
- Bill Cosby
- James Brown
- Buckwheat (Parody of Billie "Buckwheat" Thomas)
- Mr. Robinson, in Mister Robinson's Neighborhood
- Velvet Jones
- Little Richard Simmons

=== Bill Murray ===
- Nick The Lounge Singer
- Todd DiLamuca, of The Nerds
- Walter Cronkite
- Richard Burton
- David Susskind
- Dick Lanky
- Brian Welles
- Fernando
- Honker
- Ronnie Bateman
- Jerry Eldini
- Francis Jocko Leary Jr.
- Mudhad Asad, in The Bel Airabs
- Richard Herkiman, host of Shower Mike
- Niko, one of the cook's at Olympia Cafe

=== Mike Myers ===
- Wayne Campbell, host of Wayne's World
- Dieter
- Simon
- Linda Richman
- Middle-Aged Man
- Phillip the Hyper Hypo
- Pat Arnold, one of Bill Swerski's Superfans
- Stuart Rankin, owner of the All Things Scottish shop
- Andy Gray, co-host of Scottish Soccer Hooligan Weekly
- Lothar of the Hill People
- Mick Jagger
- Phil Collins
- Barbra Streisand
- Garth Brooks

== N ==
=== Kevin Nealon ===
- Tarzan
- Sam Donaldson
- Mr. Subliminal
- Franz from Hans and Franz
- One of the Elevator Fans
- Jimmy, of Jimmy & Frank, the Doormen
- One of Two Sammies
- Frank Gannon, Politically Incorrect Private Investigator
- Mr. No Depth Perception

=== Laraine Newman ===
- Connie Conehead
- Sherry, a ditzy blonde
- Amy Carter
- Rosalynn Carter

=== Don Novello ===
- Father Guido Sarducci
- Mike, one of the cooks at Olympia Cafe

=== Ego Nwodim ===
- Officer Smith from Thirsty Cops
- Lisa from Temecula
- Dionne Warwick
- L'evanka Trump of Them Trumps

== O ==
=== Michael O'Donoghue ===
- Mr. Mike

=== Cheri Oteri ===
- Arianna, one of The Spartan Cheerleaders
- Laura Zimmerman from The Zimmermans, where she and Chris Kattan played an inappropriately sexual married couple
- Debbie Reynolds, co-host of Leg Up
- Cass Van Rye, co-host of Morning Latte
- Barbara Walters
- Gloria Stuart
- Judge Judy Scheindlin
- Ross Perot
- Kathie Lee Gifford
- Downtown Julie Brown
- Mariah Carey
- Collette Reardon
- Rita DelVecchio
- Robin Byrd
- Nadeen a.k.a. the "Simmer Down Now!" lady
- Joy Lipton
- Yoko Ono

== P ==
=== Ashley Padilla ===
- Kathy

=== Chris Parnell ===
- Mervin Watson a.k.a. Merv the Perv
- Tom Brokaw
- Eminem
- Jim Lehrer
- John McCain
- Kenneth Starr
- Simon Cowell
- Wolf Blitzer
- Thad, from Gays in Space
- Daniel, one of Jarret's roommates
- Often performed rap songs on Weekend Update about wanting to sleep with many of the hot female hosts
- Terrye Funck, an effeminate-speaking southern man who hosts various public access programs
- Tyler from Appalachian Emergency Room, a hapless redneck who gets strange objects stuck up his rectum.
- One of the dancers in The Lundford Twins Feel Good Variety Hour
- Jeph from 7 Degrees Celsius
- Wayne Bloater
- Warren Kerney, from the Three-Way couple
- Tato, the shy and giggling man-servant of the Schoeners
- Shaun DeMarco from The DeMarco Brothers

=== Nasim Pedrad ===
- Arianna Huffington
- Barbara Walters
- Bedelia
- Kim Kardashian
- Lil Blaster
- M.I.A.
- Michelle Malkin
- Hoda Kotb
- Tippy
- Kelly Ripa
- Sharon Osbourne
- Heshy Farahat

=== Jay Pharoah ===
- Jay-Z
- Kanye West
- Chris Tucker
- Denzel Washington
- Eddie Murphy
- Will Smith
- Stephen A. Smith
- Shaquille O'Neal
- 50 Cent
- Usher
- Lil Wayne
- Katt Williams
- Lamar Odom
- Barack Obama
- Ben Carson
- Shannon Sharpe
- Principal Daniel Frye

=== Joe Piscopo ===
- Jimmy Carter (1980–81)
- Frank Sinatra
- David Letterman
- Paulie Herman, a New Jersey resident with a squeaky, annoying voice
- Doug Whiner

=== Amy Poehler ===
- Amber, a one-legged contestant on many reality shows
- Betty Caruso, co-host of Bronx Beat
- Nancy Grace
- Sharon Osbourne
- Dennis Kucinich
- Paula Abdul
- Sally Needler of The Couple That Should Be Divorced
- Netty Bo Dance in Appalachian Emergency Room
- Kelly Ripa
- Kaitlin
- Sharon Stone
- Deidre Nicks, co-host of The Cougar Den
- Dakota Fanning
- Hillary Clinton
- Michael Jackson
- Kim Jong-il
- Katie Couric

== Q ==
=== Randy Quaid ===
- Rudy Randolph Jr., a Texas pitchman selling off famous dictators' worldly possessions. Has a son named Rudy Randolph III (played by Robert Downey Jr.)
- Ronald Reagan (1985–86)

=== Colin Quinn ===
- Joe Blow
- Lenny the Lion
- Gene the Ex-Con
- Rolf, the "Thank You!" guy
- Robert De Niro
- Host of "Colin Quinn Explains the New York Times"

== R ==
=== Gilda Radner ===
- Emily Litella
- Candy Slice
- Bobbi Farber
- Colleen Fernman in the Bees sketches
- Jane Herkiman of Shower Mike
- Connie Carson, host of Woman To Woman
- Lisa Loopner of The Nerds
- Granny, in The Bel-Airabs
- Debbie Doody, Howdy Doody's wife
- Rhonda Weiss
- Judy Miller
- Roseanne Roseannadanna
- Baba Wawa
- Lucille Ball

=== Chris Redd ===
- Kanye West
- Lil Wayne
- Nick Cannon
- Steve Urkel
- Darius Jr. from Them Trumps

=== Jeff Richards ===
- Drunk Girl, a perpetually drunk college student who often appears on Weekend Update
- Baby K, a toddler who can rap
- Jeff, the constantly pranked roommate from Jarret's Room
- Gary Busey
- Howard Dean
- David Letterman
- Bill O'Reilly
- Willy Wonka

=== Rob Riggle ===
- Leviticus, the street prophet
- Howard Dean
- Larry The Cable Guy
- Toby Keith

=== Ann Risley ===
- Rosalynn Carter

=== Chris Rock ===
- Nat X
- Buster Jenkins
- Onski, host of I'm Chillin'
- Young Pop, in Tales From The Barbecue
- Arsenio Hall
- Michael Jackson
- Luther Campbell

=== Charles Rocket ===
- Phil Lively
- Ronald Reagan (1981)
- Host of The Rocket Report

=== Tony Rosato ===
- Ed Asner
- Lou Costello
- Richard Nixon

=== Maya Rudolph ===
- Beertje Van Beers, co-host of Club Traxx (2003-04)
- Beyoncé Knowles
- Britanica, singer from Gemini's Twin
- Casey, the original assistant in MacGruber
- Charli Coffee
- Charo
- Christina Aguilera
- Condoleezza Rice
- Diana Ross
- Donatella Versace
- Jennifer Lopez
- Jodi Deitz, co-host of Bronx Beat
- Kamala Harris
- Liza Minnelli
- Megan, host of Wake Up Wakefield!
- Michelle Obama
- Nuni Schoener
- Oprah Winfrey
- Patti Sylviac
- Rebecca, host of Fiesta Politica
- Time Traveling Scott Joplin, host of Tennis Talk
- Whitney Houston

== S ==
=== Andy Samberg ===
- Blizzard Man
- Shy Ronnie
- Out of Breath Jogger, an exhausted runner who dispenses current events from different eras
- T'Shane, co-host of Deep House Dish
- Mark Wahlberg
- Rahm Emanuel
- Billy Bob Thornton
- Kuato, an infant-sized mutant who lives inside the belly of Danny (a parody from the movie Total Recall)
- Cathy
- Kevin Federline
- Jack Johnson
- Admiral Spaceship of Laser Cats
- Mark Zuckerberg
- Nicolas Cage
- Rick Santorum
- Liam the teenager who just woke up

=== Adam Sandler ===
- Opera Man
- Cajun Man
- Canteen Boy
- Audience McGee
- Hank Gelfand from Zagat's
- Lucy, one of the Gap Girls
- Pedro, of Captain Jim and Pedro
- One of the Two Guys from a Religious Cult on Weekend Update
- Helios, one of the Hub's Gyros guys
- Fabio, of the Il Cantore guys
- The Herlihy Boy
- Tony Vallencourt, Boston guy
- Brian, host of The Denise Show
- Carlo, one of The Kitchen Boys
- Bono
- Bill Cosby
- Eddie Vedder
- Axl Rose
- David Brenner
- Gary Dell'Abate
- Bruce Springsteen

=== Horatio Sanz ===
- Carol
- Jasper Hahn, illustrator
- Mañuel Pantalones on the talk show, ¡Show Biz Grande Explosion!
- Ferey Muhtar, host of The Ferey Muhtar Talk Show
- Goby, the co-host on Jarret's Room
- Mr. Banglian, from Wake Up Wakefield!
- Frankie from The Boston Teens
- Kid Shazzam, co-host of Rap Street
- Vasquez Gomez-Vasquez
- Rick, from Kaitlin & Rick
- Customer from Jeffrey's
- Choo Choo from The Leather Man
- Elton John
- Billy Joel
- Aaron Neville
- Ozzy Osbourne
- Rosie O'Donnell
- Saddam Hussein

=== Rob Schneider ===
- Richard "Richmeister" Laymer, the "Makin' Copies" guy
- Orgasm Guy
- Tiny Elvis
- Frank, of Jimmy & Frank, the Doormen
- Tammy from the Donut Hut, in the Gap Girls sketches
- Carlo, of the Il Cantore sketches
- The "Put Your Weed In It" guy
- The Sensitive Naked Guy
- One of the Hub's Gyros guys
- Elvis Presley
- Peter Lorre
- k.d. lang
- Soon-Yi Previn

=== Molly Shannon ===
- Mary Katherine Gallagher
- Sally O'Malley
- Helen Madden
- Terri Rialto, co-host of The Delicious Dish
- Ann Miller, co-host of Leg Up
- Courtney Love
- Gwen Stefani
- Liza Minnelli
- Monica Lewinsky
- Meredith Vieira
- Miss Colleen, co-host of Dog Show (1998)
- Circe Nightshade, co-host of Goth Talk
- Jeannie Darcy

=== Harry Shearer ===
- Mr. Blackwell
- Ronald Reagan (1984)
- Mike Wallace
- Robin Leach
- Gerald, one of the Synchronized Swimmers
- Mark Shubb, one of The Folksmen

=== Martin Short ===
- Ed Grimley, a nerdy Wheel of Fortune fan who plays the triangle and has a goldfish for a pet. This character was originally created for the show SCTV, but wasn't as popular there as it was on SNL. A short-lived cartoon series was made based on this character from 1988 to 1989.
- Jackie Rogers Jr., an albino entertainer who appears on the sketch The Joe Franklin Show. He hosted the game show parody (on SNL) called Jackie Rogers's $100,000 Jackpot Wad
- Lawrence Orback (best known as one of the Synchronized Swimmers)
- Nathan Thurm
- Irving Cohen
- Jerry Lewis
- Katharine Hepburn

=== Sarah Silverman ===
- Cher
- Natalie Merchant
- Laura Leighton as Sydney Andrews on Melrose Place

=== Jenny Slate ===
- Tina Tina Chanuse
- Hoda Kotb

=== Robert Smigel ===
- Carl Wollarski, one of Bill Swerski's Superfans
- One of the Hub's Gyros guys
- Caracci's Pizza Chef
- Avi, the announcer for Sabra Shopping Network and Sabra Price is Right in the Sabra sketches
- Hank Fielding, of The Moron's Perspective on Weekend Update
- Dr. Bighead in The Ambiguously Gay Duo

=== David Spade ===
- Dick Clark's receptionist
- Total Bastard Airlines steward (a.k.a. the "Buh-Bye" guy)
- Stevie Siskin
- Karl, the video store guy
- One of the Two Guys from a Religious Cult on Weekend Update
- Host of Spade in America
- Host of Hollywood Minute on Weekend Update
- Kato Kaelin
- Joan Rivers
- Tom Petty
- Don Lapre
- Christian Slater
- Michael J. Fox
- Brad Pitt
- Owen Wilson
- Jailed Martha Stewart
- Teri Hatcher

=== Pamela Stephenson ===
- Angela Bradleigh
- Billy Idol
- Cyndi Lauper

=== Cecily Strong ===
- Cathy Anne on Weekend Update
- Melania Trump
- Jeanine Pirro
- Rachel Maddow
- Stormy Daniels
- Tulsi Gabbard
- Marjorie Taylor Greene
- Kate Middleton
- Gemma, a British singer
- Gracelynn Chisholm, co-host of Right Side of the Bed!
- Girl you wish you hadn't started a conversation with at a party on Weekend Update
- Heather, a one-dimensional female character from a male-driven comedy
- Kyra of Girlfriends Talk Show
- Lonnie in Science Room

=== Jason Sudeikis ===
- One of the Two A-Holes
- Jeff, the obnoxious boom mic operator
- Ed Mahoney
- One of the members of "Jon Bovi"
- Dane Cook
- Billy Ray Cyrus
- George W. Bush (2006–08)
- Mitt Romney
- Todd Palin
- Joe Biden
- Simon Cowell
- Jim Nantz
- Wolf Blitzer
- Glenn Beck
- Robert Osborne
- Philip Seymour Hoffman
- Rod Blagojevich
- Will Schuester
- Taylor Hicks
- DJ Super Soak
- Flip Flop, one of the Hip Hop Kids
- Phil of the Dysfunctional Holiday Family
- Pete Twinkle, ESPN Color Commentator
- Dancer on "What Up With That?"

=== Julia Sweeney ===
- Pat
- Sandy, one of the co-workers in Makin' Copies!
- Chelsea Clinton
- Leslie Abramson
- Joan Embery
- Jane Pauley
- Joy Philbin
- Dame Sarah Kensington, a frequent guest on Theatre Stories

=== Terry Sweeney ===
- Nancy Reagan
- Joan Collins

== T ==
=== Kenan Thompson ===
- Al Sharpton
- Al Roker
- Bill Cosby
- Star Jones
- Diondre Cole, the host of the BET show What Up With That?
- DJ Dynasty Handbag from Deep House Dish
- Jean K. Jean, a Def Jam Comedian from France who appears on Weekend Update
- Reggie, the bandleader on The Dakota Fanning Show
- Oscar Rogers, the Weekend Update financial consultant
- Charles Barkley
- Virginiaca Hastings
- Googie Rene, owner of "Slightly Stained and Partially Damaged" clothing outlets
- Grady Wilson, the "love-making technique" instructional video host
- Givindy, from Gays in Space
- Kenneth, the stagehand on The Cougar Den
- K Smoove, one of the Hip Hop Kids
- Sam, student in the Gilly sketches
- Lou, in the Penelope sketches
- Reese De'What, host of Cinema Classics
- Sexy Narrator in the Eternal Spark of Love sketches
- Marcus, interpreter of deaf comedian Richtie B
- Lorenzo Macintosh, a Scared Straight representative whose stories always resemble classic movies
- Reba McEntire
- David Ortiz
- Whoopi Goldberg
- Magic Johnson
- Steve Harvey
- Darnell Hayes, or "Alex Treblack", host of Black Jeopardy
- Trey, a friend of Stuart's in The Californians

== V ==
=== Danitra Vance ===
- Cabrini Green Jackson, a teenaged mother who dispensed advice on the do's and don'ts of being pregnant.
- Latoya Marie (That Black Girl), a struggling actress

=== Melissa Villaseñor ===
- Alexandria Ocasio-Cortez
- Ana Navarro
- Lady Gaga

== W ==
=== Nancy Walls ===
- Gail Lafferty, a church bazaar attendee always itching for a fight with other attendees (in one episode, she was thrown through a window by an attendee played by Teri Hatcher)
- Cindy, the Timelife hotline operator
- Susan Taylor, neighbor who's always invited to Frank Henderson's (Will Ferrell) barbecues in the Get Off The Shed! sketches
- Bobbie Battista
- Martha Stewart

=== Michaela Watkins ===
- Angie Tempura, the BitchPleeze.com blogger
- Arianna Huffington
- Barbara Walters
- Hoda Kotb

=== Damon Wayans ===
- Keith, one of The Stand-Ups
- Ned Jones, one of The Jones Brothers

=== Patrick Weathers ===
- Bob Dylan
- Ravi Shankar

=== Kristen Wiig ===
- The Target Lady
- Angela Dixon
- The female half of Two A-Holes
- Aunt Linda
- Jacqueline Seka, co-host of The Cougar Den
- Penelope, the one-upper
- Stacia, the ugly twin
- Judy Grimes
- Porch Sitter
- Jackie Snad
- The Crazy McCain Lady
- Mindy Elise Grayson on Secret Word
- Björk
- Judy Garland
- Jennifer Tilly
- Nancy Pelosi
- Madonna
- Greta Van Susteren
- Gwen Stefani
- Jamie Lee Curtis
- Kathie Lee Gifford
- Elisabeth Hasselbeck
- Michele Bachmann
- Kate Gosselin
- Suze Orman
- Lana Del Rey
- Virgania Horsen
- Vicky St. Elmo, in MacGruber
- Dooneese, the deformed singing sister on The Lawrence Welk Show
- Kat, of holiday singing duo Garth & Kat
- Jean, one of The Introverts
- Sue, a woman who can never contain her excitement at surprise parties
- Sexy Shana, the sexy office worker with unsexy behavior
- Judith, of the Dysfunctional Holiday Family
- Gilly, a highly mischievous schoolgirl
- Trina, a strange woman who calls everyone "Thomas"
- Cheryl Bryant, the overly-excited "Home Giveaway" reporter
- Anastasia Sticks of Hollywood Dish
- Drew Barrymore
- Diane Sawyer
- Paula Deen
- Taylor Swift
- Kris Jenner
- Triangle Sally

=== Casey Wilson ===
- Katy Perry
- Rachael Ray
- Jennifer Aniston
- Dusty Velvet, the paralyzed stripper
- Toni Ward, co-host of The Cougar Den
- Nancy, in the Dysfunctional Holiday Family sketches
- Sam, in the Penelope sketches
- Nora, one of the singing sisters on The Lawrence Welk Show

=== Fred Wolf ===
- Martina Navratilova

== Y ==
=== Bowen Yang ===
- Chen Biao
- Dr. Please
- Garrett
- Kim Jong-un
- George Santos
- Andrew Yang

== Z ==
=== Alan Zweibel ===
- Marlon Brando
