= List of Saturday Night Live musical sketches =

Saturday Night Live has featured many recurring characters that appear in sketches with a musical theme. In addition, there are characters listed here who predominantly featured music but may not have exclusively featured it.

- Nick the Lounge Singer (Bill Murray) – April 16, 1977
- The Blues Brothers (Dan Aykroyd, John Belushi) – April 22, 1978
- Candy Slice (Gilda Radner) – December 9, 1978
- Buckwheat (Eddie Murphy) – October 10, 1981
- Pudge & Solomon (Joe Piscopo, Eddie Murphy) – January 30, 1982
- The Sweeney Sisters (Jan Hooks, Nora Dunn, Marc Shaiman) – October 18, 1986
- Tonto, Tarzan & Frankenstein's Monster (Jon Lovitz, Kevin Nealon, Phil Hartman) – December 19, 1987
- I'm Chillin' (Chris Rock, Chris Farley) – January 12, 1991
- Opera Man (Adam Sandler) – April 18, 1992
- Mighty Mack Blues (John Goodman) – March 25, 1995
- G-Dog (Tim Meadows) – December 2, 1995
- The Roxbury Guys (Chris Kattan, Will Ferrell) – March 23, 1996
- The Culps (Ana Gasteyer, Will Ferrell) – November 2, 1996
- Janet Reno's Dance Party (Will Ferrell) – January 11, 1997
- The DeMarco Brothers (Chris Parnell, Chris Kattan) – March 15, 1997
- Gunner Olsen (Jim Breuer) – March 7, 1998
- 7 Degrees Celsius (Will Ferrell, Chris Kattan, Chris Parnell, Jimmy Fallon, Horatio Sanz) – January 16, 1999
- Gemini's Twin (Maya Rudolph, Ana Gasteyer) – November 4, 2000
- Rap Street (Jerry Minor, Horatio Sanz) – November 18, 2000
- Season's Greetings From Saturday Night Live (Christmas is Number One) (Horatio Sanz, Jimmy Fallon, Chris Kattan, Tracy Morgan) – December 16, 2000
- The Kelly Brothers (Fred Armisen, Will Forte) – February 8, 2003
- Mascots (Justin Timberlake) – October 11, 2003
- The Prince Show (Fred Armisen, Maya Rudolph) – February 14, 2004
- The Lundford Twins Feel Good Variety Hour (Fred Armisen, Amy Poehler) – January 22, 2005
- Deep House Dish (Kenan Thompson, Rachel Dratch, Andy Samberg) – November 19, 2005
- The Lawrence Welk Show (Fred Armisen, Kristen Wiig) – October 4, 2008
- Les Jeunes de Paris (Taran Killam) - October 23, 2010

== See also ==
- Recurring Saturday Night Live characters and sketches
- Recurring Saturday Night Live characters and sketches (listed chronologically)
- Saturday Night Live TV show sketches
- Saturday Night Live commercials
- Saturday Night Live characters appearing on Weekend Update
