= Black Puma =

Black Puma may refer to:

- Black Puma, a black superhero
- Black Puma, a recurring character in Saturday Night Live
- Black Puma, alias of Takeshi Kuroki, a Tokumei Sentai Go-Busters character

== See also ==
- Black Pumas, American psychedelic soul band
