= Saturday Night Live characters appearing on Weekend Update =

Weekend Update has been a platform for Saturday Night Live characters to grow and gain popularity ever since Gilda Radner used it to create Emily Litella and Roseanne Roseannadanna. Many cast members have used Update as the primary vehicle for a certain character. Don Novello was featured almost exclusively on the news segment as his breakout character, Father Guido Sarducci, and Tim Kazurinsky, in the face of Eddie Murphy's overshadowing popularity, created characters almost exclusively for Update. Before becoming an anchor on Update, Colin Quinn used the segment as his main sounding board as well.

Significant characters who appeared chiefly on Weekend Update are listed here in chronological order of their first appearance.

- Emily Litella (Gilda Radner) – December 13, 1975 (first overall appearance was in a fake television show called "Looks At Books", which aired on the season 1 episode hosted by Robert Klein)
- Baba Wawa (Gilda Radner) - April 24, 1976
- Audrey Peart Dickman (Jane Curtin) - May 29, 1976
- Debbie Doody (Gilda Radner) - April 16, 1977
- Roseanne Roseannadanna (Gilda Radner) – January 21, 1978 (first overall appearance was in a fake commercial called "Hire the Incompetent" which aired on the season 3 episode hosted by Charles Grodin)
- Father Guido Sarducci (Don Novello) – October 21, 1978 (first overall appearance was during a segment called "How You Pay For Your Sins", which aired on the season 3 episode hosted by Richard Dreyfuss)
- Chico Escuela (Garrett Morris) – December 9, 1978 (first overall appearance was during a sketch named "St. Mickey's Knights of Columbus", which aired on the season 4 episode hosted by Buck Henry)
- Vic Ricker (Harry Shearer) – January 26, 1980
- Raheem Abdul Muhammed (Eddie Murphy) - December 6, 1980
- Dr. Jack Badofsky (Tim Kazurinsky) – February 27, 1982
- Siobhan Cahill (Mary Gross) – March 12, 1983 (first overall appearance was during a sketch named "The Irish Radio Hour", which aired on the season 8 episode hosted by Lily Tomlin)
- Worthington Clotman (Tim Kazurinsky) – January 28, 1984
- Wayne Huevos (Tim Kazurinsky) – February 18, 1984
- Lew Goldman (Billy Crystal) – October 13, 1984
- Nathan Thurm (Martin Short) – December 1, 1984 (first overall appearance was during a parody of the television programme 60 Minutes, which aired on the season 10 episode hosted by Ed Asner)
- Buddy Young Jr. (Billy Crystal) – February 9, 1985 (first overall appearance was in a fake commercial called "Buddy Young Jr. Is Back!", which aired on the season 10 episode hosted by Michael McKean)
- Dwight MacNamara (Gary Kroeger) – February 16, 1985 (first overall appearance was during a sketch named "Coronet Man", which aired on the season 9 episode hosted by Teri Garr)
- Tommy Flanagan (Jon Lovitz) – January 25, 1986 (first overall appearance in a fake commercial called "Pathological Liars Anonymous", which aired on the season 11 episode hosted by former cast member Chevy Chase)
- Babette (Nora Dunn) – February 15, 1986
- Mr. Subliminal (Kevin Nealon) – October 7, 1989 (first overall appearance was during an eponymous segment, which aired on the season 12 premiere hosted by Sigourney Weaver)
- Annoying Man (Jon Lovitz) – November 11, 1989
- Grumpy Old Man (Dana Carvey) – January 13, 1990 (first overall appearance was during a sketch named "Grumpy Old Men", which aired on the season 14 episode hosted by Ted Danson)
- Queen Shenequa (Ellen Cleghorne) – October 26, 1991
- Jan Brady (Melanie Hutsell) – January 11, 1992
- Cajun Man (Adam Sandler) – February 8, 1992
- Buster Jenkins (Chris Rock) – March 13, 1993 (first overall appearance was during a sketch named "Bank Robbery", which aired on the season 17 episode hosted by Jason Priestley)
- Opera Man (Adam Sandler) – April 18, 1992
- Hank Fielding (Robert Smigel) – November 14, 1992
- Bennett Brauer (Chris Farley) – April 10, 1993
- British Fops (Mark McKinney, David Koechner) – November 11, 1995
- Joe Blow (Colin Quinn) – November 18, 1995
- Gary MacDonald (David Koechner) – December 2, 1995
- Lenny The Lion (Colin Quinn) – December 9, 1995
- Dominican Lou (Tracy Morgan) – March 22, 1997
- Cinder Calhoun (Ana Gasteyer) – September 27, 1997 (first overall appearance was during a sketch named "Thanksgiving Song Auditions", which aired on the season 22 episode hosted by former cast member Phil Hartman)
- Gunner Olsen (Jim Breuer) – March 7, 1998
- Jacob Silj (Will Ferrell) – December 4, 1999
- Jasper Hahn (Horatio Sanz) – January 8, 2000
- Jeannie Darcy (Molly Shannon) – November 18, 2000
- Gay Hitler (Chris Kattan) – October 13, 2001
- Drunk Girl (Jeff Richards) – December 8, 2001
- Fericito (Fred Armisen) – October 5, 2002
- Tim Calhoun (Will Forte) – October 19, 2002
- The Kelly Brothers (Fred Armisen, Will Forte) – February 8, 2003
- Billy Smith (Fred Armisen) – October 18, 2003
- Jorge Rodriguez (Horatio Sanz) – May 1, 2004
- Jon Bovi (Will Forte, Jason Sudeikis) – October 7, 2006
- Two Gay Guys from Jersey (Fred Armisen, Bill Hader) – October 28, 2006
- Aunt Linda (Kristen Wiig) – December 2, 2006
- Nicholas Fehn (Fred Armisen) – October 13, 2007
- Roger A. Trevanti (Fred Armisen) – November 3, 2007 (was a one-shot character that gained a following on YouTube videos during the 2007–2008 Writers' Guild of America strike)
- Judy Grimes (Kristen Wiig) – April 12, 2008
- Jean K. Jean (Kenan Thompson) – March 8, 2008
- Willie (Kenan Thompson)
- David “Big Papi” Ortiz (Kenan Thompson)
- Garth and Kat (Fred Armisen, Kristen Wiig) – December 19, 2009
- Stefon (Bill Hader) – April 24, 2010 (first overall appearance was in a one-shot sketch on the season 34 episode hosted by Ben Affleck)
- Anthony Crispino (Bobby Moynihan) – October 2, 2010
- Drunk Uncle (Bobby Moynihan)
- Cathy Anne (Cecily Strong)
- Jebidiah Atkinson the 1860s newspaper critic (Taran Killam)
- Best Friends from Growing Up (Fred Armisen and Vanessa Bayer)
- Child actor Laura Parsons (Vanessa Bayer)
- Arianna Huffington (Nasim Pedrad) - February 11, 2012
- The Girl You Wish You Hadn't Started a Conversation with at a Party (Cecily Strong) – November 3, 2012 (first overall appearance was on the September 27, 2012 Weekend Update Thursday)
- Jacob the Bar Mitzvah Boy (Vanessa Bayer) – December 15, 2012
- Supreme Court Justice Ruth Bader Ginsburg (Kate McKinnon) - February 11, 2017
- The Guy Who Just Bought a Boat (Alex Moffat) – February 11, 2017
- Angel, Every Boxer's Girlfriend from Every Movie About Boxing Ever (Heidi Gardner) – November 4, 2017
- Teen film critic Bailey Gismert (Heidi Gardner) – January 27, 2018
- Chen Biao (Bowen Yang), a Chinese trade commissioner (or "trade daddy") who is now a health minister because of the coronavirus epidemic. - October 5, 2019
- Dr. Wayne Wenowdis (Kate McKinnon) – October 10, 2020
- Crystal Your coworker who is extremely busy doing seemingly nothing (Heidi Gardner) – April 8, 2023

== See also ==
- Recurring Saturday Night Live characters and sketches
- Recurring Saturday Night Live characters and sketches (listed chronologically)
- Saturday Night Live TV show sketches
- Saturday Night Live commercials
- Saturday Night Live musical sketches
