= Land Shark (Saturday Night Live) =

Recurring character

The Land Shark (also land shark, landshark, LandShark) was a recurring character from the sketch comedy television series Saturday Night Live. It was a shark which (unlike real-life sharks) can talk and travel on land.

The character first appeared during the show's debut season in the fall of 1975 as a response to the release of the film Jaws and the subsequent hysteria over purported shark sightings. It was one of the most popular and imitated sketches of SNL's first season, and appeared occasionally in later seasons.

== Original sketch ==
The Land Shark first appeared in a sketch entitled "Jaws II" on the Candice Bergen-hosted episode (season 1 episode 4), which originally aired on November 8, 1975. As narrated by Don Pardo (the announcer):

the Land Shark is considered the cleverest of all sharks. Unlike the Great White shark, which tends to inhabit the waters and harbors of recreational beach areas, the Land Shark may strike at any place, any time. It is capable of disguising its voice, and generally preys on young, single women.

The sketch depicted the Land Shark (voiced by Chevy Chase) attacking several people after knocking on their doors, pretending to be repairmen, door-to-door salesmen, and the like. Once the intended victim opens the door, the Land Shark quickly enters and attacks them. The sketch is typified by the following exchange:

[Scene: Interior. A New York City apartment. There is a knock at the door.]

Woman: [speaking through closed door] Yes?
Voice: (mumbling) Mrs. Arlsburgerhhh?
Woman: Who?
Voice: (mumbling) Mrs. Johannesburrrr?
Woman: Who is it?
Voice: [pause] Flowers.
Woman: Flowers for whom?
Voice: [long pause] Plumber, ma'am.
Woman: I don't need a plumber. You're that clever shark, aren't you?
Voice: [pause] Candygram.
Woman: Candygram, my foot! You get out of here before I call the police! You're the shark, and you know it!
Voice: Wait. I-I'm only a dolphin, ma'am.
Woman: A dolphin? Well...okay. [opens door]

[Huge latex and foam-rubber shark head lunges through open door, chomps down on woman's head, and drags her out of the apartment, as Jaws attack music plays.]

The Land Shark attack scenes are intermixed with other scenes directly spoofing Jaws, featuring Dan Aykroyd as Chief Brody and John Belushi as Matt Hooper.

== Other appearances on SNL ==
The character returned in later episodes with the original cast, after which it did not appear for many years.

Season 1, Episode 6

Titled "Jaws III". The women were played by regulars Laraine Newman, Jane Curtin, and Gilda Radner, and guest host Lily Tomlin, who is seen being attacked at the last minute. The shark was earlier heard attacking a newsman offscreen (voiced by long-time SNL announcer Don Pardo) reporting on the shark's reign of terror. As Tomlin's character is being attacked at the end, only Belushi’s self-absorbed, oblivious Hooper is still alive.

Season 1, Episode 23

In the opening monologue with guest host Louise Lasser, the Land Shark attempts to lure Lasser out of her dressing room.

Season 2, Episode 6

In a sketch titled "Trick-or-Treating Land Shark", having lured Gilda Radner out of her home by claiming to be with UNICEF, the shark attacks her, then pops his head back through the doorway, opening its mouth to reveal Chevy Chase, who announces, "Live from New York, it's Saturday Night!" (the cold opening).

Season 2, Episode 22

Titled "Lucky Lindy", the shark meets aviator Charles Lindbergh, played by Buck Henry, on a transatlantic flight. Since Chase left the show after this season, the character did not return as a regular.

Season 3, Episode 11

Titled "No Funny Ending". The final sketch of the show; various sketch endings are attempted. Chevy Chase is guest star for this episode.

Season 3, Episode 19

Twice during the episode, host Richard Dreyfuss hears the Jaws theme. During the closing credits, he is finally attacked by the shark.

Season 8, Episode 1

Chevy Chase hosted the eighth season premiere on September 25, 1982, live via satellite from the West Coast (he was represented by a TV on the set which interacted with the other performers). He opened the show as the Land Shark, who attacked through the TV set.

Season 27, Episode 2

During Weekend Update, as Tina Fey introduces a segment about that year's spate of shark attacks, the Land Shark knocks at the door to the newsroom, then attacks Tina Fey. As Fallon closes the segment with "I'm Jimmy Fallon", Chase turns to the camera and replies, with a variation on his own former Weekend Update turn of phrase, "And I'm not. Good night, and have a pleasant tomorrow."

40th Anniversary Special

During the Weekend Update tribute with Tina Fey, Amy Poehler and Jane Curtin, a doorbell rings; Curtin, in terror, warns Fey not to open the door because of the Land Shark, but Fey dismisses her. Fey initially appears to be right: Matt Foley (played by Melissa McCarthy) appears, giving one of his traditional motivational speeches, but behind Foley is the Land Shark (this time played by Bobby Moynihan), who again attempts to eat Fey. Curtin and Poehler work to free Fey from the shark's jaws as the sketch closes.

== See also ==
- Recurring Saturday Night Live characters and sketches
