= The Showbiz Show with David Spade =

- Created by: Hugh Fink
- Starring: David Spade
- Country of origin: United States
- No. of seasons: 3
- No. of episodes: 39

Production
- Running time: 22 minutes

Original release
- Network: Comedy Central
- Release: September 17, 2005 – June 21, 2007

The Showbiz Show with David Spade is a weekly television program on Comedy Central that starred comedian David Spade. It is a comedic parody of celebrity news programs such as Entertainment Tonight and Access Hollywood. The show was developed from David Spade's Hollywood Minute segment on Saturday Night Live.

On July 29, 2019, a similar show, Lights Out with David Spade premiered on Comedy Central.

== History and background ==
The show was originally going to be a daily show titled Gone Hollywood and hosted by Greg Giraldo with David Spade as executive producer. After the pilot was completed, Comedy Central approached Spade to host the show as well as produce. Spade agreed to host if the show was changed to a weekly show. A similar pilot titled The Hollywood Show with Brian Unger was produced by Comedy Central simultaneously with this show's pilot. When it was not picked up, The Hollywood Show became the new title for this show. Spade suggested The Showbiz Show.

The show debuted on September 15, 2005. First season episodes aired Thursdays at 10:30 p.m. ET through the end of December 2005. The second season debuted on March 23, 2006 and ended on June 29. Midway through the season, the show was moved a half-hour earlier to 10:00 p.m.

The show's third season began on March 15, 2007 at 10:30 p.m and ended on June 21.

On October 3, 2007, Comedy Central announced that they wouldn't renew The Showbiz Show for a fourth season.

== Format ==
Each episode featured Spade commenting and poking fun at the week's entertainment news. Spade's comedy on the show made abundant use of biting one-liners that usually insult celebrities:

“Michael Jackson is selling his Neverland Ranch -- apparently now that it's 15 years old he doesn't find it attractive anymore.”

The show also featured comedians Brian Posehn, Andrew Daly, Scott Adsit, Nick Swardson and Jessi Klein as entertainment correspondents. Rob Lowe occasionally appeared between commercial breaks to tell a joke with a deadpan expression.

The Ninja from Ask a Ninja appeared on the show describing the new season of The Sopranos.
