= Recurring Saturday Night Live characters and sketches introduced 1992–93 =

Occasionally seen roles in the NBC sketch show's 18th season

The following is a list of recurring Saturday Night Live characters and sketches introduced between September 26, 1992, and May 15, 1993, the eighteenth season of SNL.

== Tiny Elvis ==
Nicolas Cage plays Tiny Elvis. Rob Schneider plays Sonny, Kevin Nealon plays Red, and Chris Farley plays Joe Esposito, in stereotypical "Memphis Mafia" roles. The sketch would be about a tiny Elvis Presley, with sycophantic characters laughing at any jokes he made while drawing attention to the relative hugeness of ordinary objects. Remarks about his size in relation to his cuteness elicit threats of a physical nature from the King. The sketch ends with him singing "I'm Tiny Elvis!" Debuted September 26, 1992.

== Larry King Live ==
A parody of Larry King Live, with Kevin Nealon impersonating host Larry King.

Appearances

Season	Episode	Host	Notes
18	October 3, 1992	Tim Robbins	
19	September 25, 1993	Charles Barkley	
20	October 15, 1994	John Travolta	

== Hollywood Minute ==
David Spade makes professional and personal attacks against celebrities. The segment consisted of a series of sarcastic one-liners against various celebrities, whose pictures were usually shown in one of the upper corners of the screen. Debuted October 3, 1992.

Originally a section of "Weekend Update" Spade received a regular segment, Spade in America. Spade used a hand-puppet of himself to reprise this role when he returned to SNL as a guest host, stating that he didn't feel like insulting celebrities anymore, but that didn't mean that a puppet couldn't.

In one notable instance, a picture of former SNL cast member Eddie Murphy appeared onscreen and Spade exclaimed, "Look, children, it's a falling star. Make a wish!" referring to Murphy's lack of box office success at the time. This caused a major feud between SNL and Murphy. In another segment, he began to mock Steve Martin, but then Martin appeared behind him. Upon turning around and seeing Martin was there, Spade got up and ran off. Martin then sat in Spade's chair and began roasting Spade.

In 2005, Spade took this format to Comedy Central and made it the featured segment on his weekly program entitled The Showbiz Show with David Spade.

Appearances

Season	Episode	Host	Notes
18	October 3, 1992	Tim Robbins	
18	October 24, 1992	Christopher Walken	
18	November 21, 1992	Sinbad	
18	January 16, 1993	Harvey Keitel	
18	February 20, 1993	Bill Murray	
18	May 15, 1993	Kevin Kline	
19	September 25, 1993	Charles Barkley	
19	December 4, 1993	Charlton Heston	
19	February 19, 1994	Martin Lawrence	
21	December 9, 1995	David Alan Grier	Spade In America
21	March 23, 1996	Phil Hartman	Spade in America
21	May 18, 1996	Jim Carrey	Spade in America
22	February 8, 1997	Neve Campbell	
24	November 7, 1998	David Spade	

== Audience McGee ==
An Adam Sandler sketch. Debuted October 24, 1992.

== Hank Fielding ==
Hank Fielding was a commentator played by Robert Smigel who provided the "Moron's Perspective". He appeared to be an average commentator, but his speech was indicative that he was extremely slow, and that he clearly had difficulty discerning fantasy from reality. In one appearance, he commented on President Bill Clinton's State of the Union Address, complaining that his overly long speech pre-empted other shows like Jake and the Fatman, making actor William Conrad wait nervously backstage as the President "rambled on". His appearance was supplemented by an extremely slow scrawling of his signature across the screen. Debuted November 14, 1992.

== Tony Vallencourt ==
An Adam Sandler sketch. The character spoke with a heavy New England accent and was meant to spoof the white trash of Massachusetts and Rhode Island; denouncing those who studied diligently and looking to maximize workmen's compensation claims. The character also had a brother, who appeared as "The Vallencourt Boys". Tony Vallencourt also appeared as a contestant on "What's the Best Way?", a game show skit where different geographic areas in New England were chosen at random, and players had to tell of which route to take. Debuted December 12, 1992.

== Gap Girls ==
An Adam Sandler, David Spade and later Chris Farley sketch, where the characters in drag would chat in valley girl slang and not take their jobs seriously, often telling complaining customers to "cinch it". Their enemy was Tracy, played by Rob Schneider, whom they called the "Donut Hut Slut" as a rhyming insult for working at a donut place in the same shopping mall as them. The sketch was best remembered for a line where Farley was eating most of the Gap girls' french fries and Spade's character reminds "her" they were on a diet, to which the character immediately went from a valley girl falsetto to a deep, possessed voice, shouting "LAY OFF ME, I'M STARVING!", causing Sandler and Spade to struggle not to break character, with Sandler attempting to stifle his laughter as Farley was fake-choking Spade. Debuted January 9, 1993.

Appearances

Season	Episode	Host	Notes
18	January 9, 1993	Danny DeVito	
18	February 13, 1993	Alec Baldwin	
18	May 8, 1993	Christina Applegate	
19	September 25, 1993	Charles Barkley	
19	January 15, 1994	Sara Gilbert	
20	April 15, 1995	Courteney Cox	

== Sassy's Sassiest Boys ==
Phil Hartman played Russell Clark, editor of Sassy Magazine, who interviewed young, male celebrities of the day, and incessantly repeated the term "Sassy!", or variations of it ("The French have a word for it: Sassé!" or "Looks like someone stepped in a big pile of Sassy!") after each guest's response. Guests included Joey Lawrence (played by Mike Myers) whose sole response to everything was the expression, "Whoa!" (his character's catchphrase on the sitcom, Blossom). Adam Sandler made an appearance as "Marky" Mark Wahlberg and Jay Mohr appeared as Andrew McCarthy, still lamenting his breakup with Molly Ringwald (continuously repeating "I love her, man.") Debuted February 6, 1993.

== Canteen Boy ==
An Adam Sandler sketch. Debuted March 13, 1993.

== Hub's Gyros ("You like-a the juice?") ==
Rob Schneider, Robert Smigel, Chris Farley and Adam Sandler play workers at a gyro restaurant. Whenever a customer asks for more or extra sauce (or "juice"), they would all get intensely interested and reply back, in a Greek accent, something like: "You like the juice? The juice is good? I get you more juice!" These sketches were actually intended to be over-the-top spoofs of overused catchphrases within a sketch. Debuted April 10, 1993.

== Bennett Brauer ==
Bennett Brauer was played by Chris Farley. Debuted April 10, 1993. In each appearance, Brauer would be brought on to provide commentary for Kevin Nealon's Weekend Update. However, instead of providing commentary, he would launch into a tirade about how surprised he is that the network has let him back on the air before vividly describing his poor hygiene, lack of social grace, and resentment towards the viewers for preferring other, more photogenic commentators to him. Brauer would make regular use of air quotes to emphasize every point he made. For example:

Maybe I'm not "the norm". I'm not "camera friendly". I don't "wear clothes that fit me". I'm not a "heartbreaker". I haven't "had sex with a woman"; I don't know "how that works". I guess I don't "fall in line". I'm not "hygienic". I don't "wipe properly". I lack "style". I have no "charisma" or "self esteem". I don't "own a toothbrush" or "let my scabs heal". I can't "reach all the parts of my body". When I sleep, I "sweat profusely".

In one instance, Brauer was made to fly (via cables), although the cables became entangled with studio lighting, thereby creating one of SNL's most famous bloopers. As Nealon and a stagehand try to untangle the cables, Brauer exclaims (with air quotes), "I have a 'weight problem'! Can't they lift me?" After the cables are freed, Brauer is then lifted high above a cheering audience in a manner akin to Peter Pan. Kevin Nealon then continues the Weekend Update and the closing music is playing when a loud crash is heard. The cable has broken and a disheveled Bennett emerges from the counter; which has been damaged by his fall.

Appearances

Season	Episode	Host	Notes
18	April 10, 1993	Jason Alexander	
18	May 15, 1993	Kevin Kline	
19	March 19, 1994	Helen Hunt	

== Matt Foley ==
A Chris Farley sketch. Debuted May 8, 1993.

Appearances

Season	Episode	Host	Notes
18	May 8, 1993	Christina Applegate	Van Down By The River
19	October 30, 1993	Christian Slater	
19	December 11, 1993	Sally Field	
19	February 19, 1994	Martin Lawrence	
20	December 17, 1994	George Foreman	
20	April 15, 1995	Courteney Cox	
23	October 25, 1997	Chris Farley	

Preceded by Recurring Saturday Night Live characters and sketches introduced 1991–92	Recurring Saturday Night Live characters and sketches (listed chronologically)	Succeeded by Recurring Saturday Night Live characters and sketches introduced 1993–94
