= The Boston Teens =

- Saturday Night Live characters
- Denise and Sully
- First appearance: November 13, 1999
- Last appearance: April 15, 2017
- Created by: Rachel Dratch; Tina Fey
- Portrayed by: Rachel Dratch; Jimmy Fallon

In-universe information
- Occupation: High school students (later dropouts)
- Spouse: Married (2011 episode)
- Children: 5 (2011 episode)
- Relatives: Danny "Dadu" McDenna (Denise's brother); Bernadette Sullivan (Sully's sister)
- Religion: Irish Catholic
- Nationality: Irish American

The Boston Teens are fictional characters featured on the American television show Saturday Night Live. "The Boston Teens" debuted in 1999 and have appeared in 14 sketches to date. TV Guide named The Boston Teens among Saturday Night Live's 40 greatest characters in a list compiled in honor of the show's 40th anniversary in 2015.

== About ==
Denise "Zazu" McDenna (Rachel Dratch) and Pat Sullivan or "Sully" (Jimmy Fallon) are a pair of Lexington, Massachusetts, teenagers in love. The teens and their friends speak in a highly affected Boston accent.

The sketches are presented in the format of home video footage filmed by their unseen friend Tommy. They have a torrid relationship, often arguing and making up in the same sentence. A prime example of this is Denise's tendency to say, "You're retarded!" or "You're so queer!" to which Sully replies, "You are" and immediately starts making out with her. The sketches usually end with one of the participants making a Freudian slip and Sully hoping that Tommy caught it on camera.

The characters are very devoted fans of the Boston Red Sox. Sully typically wears a Boston Red Sox shirt, and Denise usually wears a blue and gold varsity jacket and they use the name of former star shortstop Nomar Garciaparra as a catchphrase, though with their Boston accents, it is pronounced as "Nomah!" Garciaparra makes a cameo appearance in the October 14, 2000 sketch, in which he dates Sully's older sister Bernadette (played by Kate Hudson), who flunked out of cooking school.

Frankie Hilbert (Horatio Sanz), a long-haired, bespectacled burnout, features in all but the first and latest episodes. In one episode, Justin Timberlake plays Denise's younger brother, Danny, a pyromaniac who provided the family a large sum of money after the Boston Archdiocese paid them off to keep the family from suing a priest who molested him (though, according to Danny, he was "...only minorly diddled"). The episode aired hours after Game 3 of the 2003 ALCS, and Sully references a fight between Pedro Martinez and Don Zimmer early in the game.

Donnie Bartalotti, played by Ben Affleck, has appeared three times. In the third to last Boston Teens sketch, he marries Michael Smith or "Smitty", played by Seth Meyers, as a response to Massachusetts' recent legalization of same-sex marriage.

Unlike the previous sketches, which were made to look as if recorded on a camcorder, the last sketch was made to look like it was recorded on an iPhone.

In the December 17, 2011 episode (hosted by Fallon), it was established that Sully and Denise eventually married each other and have five children: Weezer, Chubbsy, Squeeze Box, Haggs and Baby Richard.

In the April 15, 2017 episode (also hosted by Fallon), Sully and Denise take their daughter (Kate McKinnon) on a tour of Harvard hoping to enroll.

== Origin ==
The characters have their roots in a sketch called "Wicked" (an intensifier in the New England dialect, as in the expression "Wicked awesome!") performed at Chicago's Second City by Rachel Dratch and Tina Fey, playing an early version of the Denise character and her mother (or "mutha").

== Appearances ==
- November 13, 1999: host Garth Brooks
- December 11, 1999: host Danny DeVito
- February 19, 2000: host Ben Affleck
- May 13, 2000: host Britney Spears
- October 14, 2000: host Kate Hudson (featuring a cameo by Nomar Garciaparra)
- March 10, 2001: host Conan O'Brien (featuring a cameo by Ben Affleck)
- November 10, 2001: host Gwyneth Paltrow
- March 2, 2002: host Jonny Moseley
- October 5, 2002: host Matt Damon
- April 5, 2003: host Bernie Mac
- October 11, 2003: host Justin Timberlake
- March 13, 2004: host Ben Affleck
- December 17, 2011: host Jimmy Fallon
- April 15, 2017: host Jimmy Fallon

== See also ==
- Recurring Saturday Night Live characters and sketches
