= Recurring Saturday Night Live characters and sketches introduced 2004–05 =

The following is a list of recurring Saturday Night Live characters and sketches introduced between October 2, 2004, and May 21, 2005, the thirtieth season of SNL.

== Bear City ==
This series of very short films by longtime SNL writer T. Sean Shannon was about a town abandoned by humans after a meteor strike but then quickly repopulated by bears, who had rapidly evolved due to some strange chemical property of the meteor. City life continued as normal, only with bears in the place of humans. The introduction to each film, explaining the origins of Bear City, used a pre-recorded narration by Fred Willard.

Appearances

Season	Episode	Host	Notes
30	October 23, 2004	Jude Law	Bear drivers in an automobile collision.
30	December 18, 2004	Robert De Niro	Christian bears accidentally sing Christmas carols to a Jewish family. This short was cut from the December 11, 2004, episode, after dress rehearsal.
30	February 5, 2005	Paris Hilton	"Buying a Pack of Smokes." A bear buys cigarettes at a gas station, after arguing with the panda bear employee about the brand. This short was cut after dress rehearsal from the episodes that aired October 30, 2004; November 13, 2004; November 20, 2004; and December 11, 2004.
30	March 12, 2005	David Spade	A physically able bear uses the handicapped restroom, but is confronted by a bear in a wheelchair. This short was cut after dress rehearsal from the episodes that aired December 11, 2004; January 15, 2005; January 22, 2005; February 12, 2005; and February 19, 2005.
30	May 7, 2005	Johnny Knoxville	"Barstool Blues." A bear's wife calls her husband at a bar and demands he come home.
30	May 21, 2005	Lindsay Lohan	"Mom's Going Shopping." When a mother bear realizes she's forgotten her shopping list and returns home, she's startled to find her teenage son watching bear pornography.

A short about a bear working in a video rental store was cut from episodes that aired November 13, 2004, and April 16, 2005. A short where a teenage boy bear's friends embarrass him in front of a girl bear was cut from the November 20, 2004, episode. A short about a bear putting up Christmas lights was cut from the December 11, 2004, episode. A short about a bear hailing a taxi cab was cut from episodes that aired March 19, 2005, and May 7, 2005. A short about a group of bears chasing the Easter Bunny was cut from the March 19, 2005, episode. A short about a bear going shopping was cut from the April 9, 2005, episode. A short about bears riding in an elevator was cut from the May 14, 2005, episode.

== Carol! ==
Horatio Sanz plays a loud, gluttonous, vulgar, and generally obnoxious woman. Following the character's first appearance in a sketch about a key party, each successive sketch features Carol winning the attentions of a handsome and cultured gentleman played by that week's host. The sketch ends with Carol and the gentleman adjourning to some very unsavory location (such as a port-o-let or dumpster) to have sex.

In each installment of the sketch, except the first ("Key Party"), Carol attempts to order a fast-food chain's signature beverage while not at that chain (for example, in one sketch she attempts to order a "Shamrock Shake" when she's not at a McDonald's nor is it near St. Patrick's Day). Being informed the establishment can't provide that beverage, she orders an obscure high-alcohol cocktail instead, which the establishment is able to provide.

Theme song: "And then there's Carol! And then there's Carol! Sassy, slutty, sexy, skanky, right on Carol!"

Appearances

Season	Episode	Host	Notes
30	December 11, 2004	Colin Farrell	Carol and her husband Owen (Farrell) attend a key party hosted by Kathy (Amy Poehler) and Ted (Seth Meyers). Owen is reluctant to share Carol with others, but she's so eager that she turns the party into an orgy. A sequel to this sketch, with Meyers reprising his role as Ted, appeared in the dress rehearsal for the season 44 episode which Meyers hosted, but it was cut from the final show. Sanz did not appear in the sketch.
31	October 29, 2005	Lance Armstrong	Amanda (Poehler) and Jim (Jason Sudeikis) set up their friend Dylan (Armstrong) with their friend Carol at Amanda and Jim's home. This sketch appeared in the dress rehearsal for the October 1, 2005, episode, but was cut from the final show.
31	December 10, 2005	Alec Baldwin	Amanda and Jim set up their friend Doug (Baldwin) on a blind date with Carol at a bowling alley. This sketch appeared in the dress rehearsal for the December 3, 2005, episode, but was cut from the final show.
31	January 21, 2006	Peter Sarsgaard	Amanda and Jim bring Carol to the opening of Efrem's (Sarsgaard) new art gallery.
31	May 20, 2006	Kevin Spacey	Amanda and Jim are having dinner with Jim's divorced father Jerry (Spacey) when they run into Carol.

== Phoebe and her Giant Pets ==
Phoebe (Rachel Dratch) invites her date (played by that week's host) to her apartment, where he's tormented by her gigantic anthropomorphic pet (Fred Armisen).

Appearances

Season	Episode	Host	Notes
30	November 13, 2004	Liam Neeson	Phoebe introduces Ronnie (Neeson) to her African parrot, Jasper.
30	January 22, 2005	Paul Giamatti	Phoebe introduces her date (Giamatti) to her giant cat, Franklin.

A sketch in which Phoebe and her parrot, Jasper, invite her date and his giant pigeon (played by Maya Rudolph) over for lunch appeared in the dress rehearsals for the April 16, 2005, episode hosted by Tom Brady, and the May 7, 2005, episode hosted by Johnny Knoxville, but was cut before the final show both times.

== Nuni and Nuni Schoener, Art Dealers ==
Fred Armisen and Maya Rudolph play a pair of married European art dealers whose bizarre interior decorating schemes (such as a chair made entirely out of toast) result in bewilderment for their American guest. Each sketch featured massive confusion over the very subtle difference in pronunciation of their identical-sounding names (in one sketch, the female "Nuni" explains that while pronouncing her name, and not while pronouncing her husband's, "you have to squeeze your buttocks") and the Schoeners' inability to pronounce simple American names such as Pam or Jeff.

Season	Episode	Host	Notes
30	January 15, 2005	Topher Grace	Brian (Grace) and Pam (Rachel Dratch) visit the Schoeners. In this one, the pronunciation difference was cleared up early on, as Rudolph explains to Brian and Pam that "Nuni is masculine, Nuni is feminine", and once it's clarified, there's no confusion out of Brian and Pam (though the Schoeners still have trouble pronouncing Brian and Pam's names).
30	March 12, 2005	David Spade	A couple (Spade and Dratch) visit the Schoeners. Chris Parnell appears as the Schoeners' servant, Tato.
30	May 14, 2005	Will Ferrell	The Schoeners' downstairs neighbors Greg (Seth Meyers) and Susan (Dratch) come upstairs to investigate a leak and meet the Schoeners, including their son Nuni (Ferrell) and Tato.
31	March 4, 2006	Natalie Portman	The Schoeners' daughter Nuni (Portman) brings her college boyfriend Jeff (Sudeikis) home to meet her parents and Tato.
32	February 24, 2007	Rainn Wilson	Architectural Digest writers Rob (Wilson) and Kay (Kristen Wiig) come over to do a piece about the Schoeners' home; a new servant, Little Joe (Andy Samberg) appears and offers everyone cotton candy.

A sketch featuring the Schoeners appeared in the dress rehearsal for the December 9, 2006, episode hosted by Annette Bening, but was cut from the final show.

== The Lundford Twins Feel Good Variety Hour ==
This sketch featured regular cast member Fred Armisen as Henry Quincy Lundford, along with that week's SNL host, as the hosts of a 70s-era, Smothers Brothers-esque variety show. It featured Amy Poehler as Dorothy Winckler, an actress who herself was playing a character named Granny, whose catchphrase was "Aw, nuts!", accompanied by a zoom to her face; Maya Rudolph as a female-empowerment singer who sang about being pregnant and not needing a man; Kenan Thompson as a Barry White-esque, "King of the Sob Songs" singer, whose song was "Amanda"; and a skit set to 1920s-style upright piano music that featured two flappers, Charlie Chaplin, and a man cranking an old Model-T Ford.

Appearances

Season	Episode	Host	Notes
30	January 22, 2005	Paul Giamatti	
31	October 1, 2005	Steve Carell	

An installment of this sketch appeared in the dress rehearsal for the May 14, 2005, episode, hosted by Will Ferrell, but was cut before the final show.

== Gays in Space ==
A TV show about a fabulous gay spaceship crew: Thad (Chris Parnell), Billiam (Fred Armisen), and Kevindy (Kenan Thompson), led by their fearless captain (portrayed by that week's host). They occasionally meet up with another ship captained by the butch Loretta (Rachel Dratch) and crewed by Tina Fey and Paula Pell.

In the sketch's first two appearances, Maya Rudolph introduces the show and sings the closing theme song, while dressed in a silver go-go outfit; in the third appearance, this is done by Will Forte in a silver two-piece suit and turtleneck, as Rudolph was on maternity leave at the time. Gays in Space is originally shown to be a program on the Trio network; while later, the broadcasting network is shown to be Logo (this was after Trio became Sleuth and shifted its focus to paranormal and mystery content like Psych). The sketch was written by James Anderson.

Reception

In 2008, Logo's entertainment website AfterElton.com (now known as TheBacklot.com) criticized Gays in Space, among other SNL sketches such as Canteen Boy and the Scoutmaster and The Ambiguously Gay Duo, for consistently perpetuating stereotypical characterizations of the LGBT community, describing the portrayal as "a limp-wristed gay space crew, wearing silver uniforms and short-shorts, mak[ing] lewd sexual references and catty comments while sipping cocktails."

Joel Kim Booster and SNL cast member Bowen Yang are fans of the sketch and incorporated a reference to Gays in Space in their film Fire Island.

Season	Episode	Host	Notes
30	February 12, 2005	Jason Bateman	Bateman plays Captain Reggie. Loretta proposes that the two crews join together to procreate in order to save the dwindling human population.
30	March 19, 2005	Ashton Kutcher	Kutcher plays Captain Timothy. The spacemen crash land on a strange planet, where they're met by the native species, Alpha Hunktori (Seth Meyers and Rob Riggle), who resemble burly construction workers.
31	January 21, 2006	Peter Sarsgaard	Sarsgaard plays Captain Trip Bunchkin. The crew visits a space bar, where they have an altercation with Loretta and her crew before running into Trip's ex-boyfriend (Finesse Mitchell).

Preceded by Recurring Saturday Night Live characters and sketches introduced 2003–04	Recurring Saturday Night Live characters and sketches (listed chronologically)	Succeeded by Recurring Saturday Night Live characters and sketches introduced 2005–06
