= Recurring Saturday Night Live characters and sketches introduced 2018–19 =

The following is a list of recurring Saturday Night Live characters and sketches introduced during the forty-fourth season of SNL, which began on September 29, 2018.

== Thirsty Cops ==
Officer Smith (Ego Nwodim) and her partner are open to sexually harassing their male convict with the assistance of Paula Hauser (Kate McKinnon).

Season	Episode	Host	Notes
44	October 13, 2018	Seth Meyers	Leslie Jones is Officer Watts as they confront Meyers.
45	February 8, 2020	RuPaul	RuPaul is Officer Carl Knotts as they confront Pete Davidson.

== Deidre ==
A pretentious couple, Deidre (Heidi Gardner) and her significant other, played by the host, describe their vacation during a late-night dinner party.

Season	Episode	Host	Notes
44	October 13, 2018	Seth Meyers	The couple return from Cuba.
44	January 26, 2019	James McAvoy	Deidre and her new boyfriend return from New Orleans.
45	May 9, 2020	Kristen Wiig	Deidre and her new boyfriend (Martin Short) return from a quarantine vacation in Italy.

== Baskin Johns ==
An employee for Goop (Heidi Gardner) appears on Weekend Update.

Season	Episode	Host	Notes
44	October 13, 2018	Seth Meyers	
44	March 9, 2019	Idris Elba	Gwyneth Paltrow appears as Fifer James.

== Brothers ==
Two brothers Spencer and Jared, played by Beck Bennett and Kyle Mooney, argue and fight in front of their parents, played by Cecily Strong and the host, and neighbors the Campbells

Season	Episode	Host	Notes
44	November 10, 2018	Liev Schreiber	
44	January 26, 2019	James McAvoy	

== The War in Words ==
In a war documentary series, a war is shown through the lens of the letters and correspondence between a military couple. The soldier in the war (Mikey Day) becomes increasingly concerned, confused, and exasperated, as the letters of his wife back at home (played by the host) grow more absurd.

Season	Episode	Host	Notes
44	December 1, 2018	Claire Foy	World War I letters between Pvt. James Merchant of the King’s Rifles (Day) and his wife Margaret (Foy).
45	October 5, 2019	Phoebe Waller-Bridge	World War II letters between English fighter pilot William Macintosh of the Royal Air Force (Day) and his wife Lydia (Waller-Bridge).
46	April 10, 2021	Carey Mulligan	World War II letters between Royal Navy Lt. Bertie Pembrook (Day) and his wife Mary (Mulligan)

An earlier version of the sketch appeared on Maya & Marty in 2016, depicting Civil War letters between Pvt. Trenton McGuire of the 2nd Pennsylvania infantry (Day) and wife Elizabeth (Maya Rudolph). A 2013 SNL sketch, "Civil War Love Letters," was also similar; it featured host Jennifer Lawrence as Madeline, writing eloquent letters to her fiancé Gregory (Tim Robinson), whose responses consisted mainly of demands for explicit photographs of her.

== Jules, Who Sees Things a Little Differently ==
Jules (Beck Bennett) appears on Weekend Update to give his unique perspective on things.

Season	Episode	Host	Notes
44	December 1, 2018	Claire Foy	Jules talks about the economy.
44	February 17, 2019	Don Cheadle	Jules discusses the Oscars.
45	December 7, 2019	Jennifer Lopez	Jules gives his thoughts on the holiday season.

== Them Trumps ==
The Trump family is reimagined as an African-American family, featuring Kenan Thompson as Donald Trump parody Darius Trump, Leslie Jones as Melania Trump parody Malika Trump, Chris Redd as Donald Trump Jr. parody Darius Trump Jr, and Ego Nwodim as Ivanka Trump parody L'evanka Trump. The sketches typically aired during weeks where the real Donald Trump had come seemingly close to impeachment, and the joke would come when Darius Trump would attempt to reassure his family that as the President of the United States, people would have to treat him fairly, even though he was a black man. Upon saying this, he would usually be impeached, booed, or even arrested.

Season	Episode	Host	Notes
44	December 8, 2018	Jason Momoa	
44	February 9, 2019	Halsey	
45	December 7, 2019	Jennifer Lopez	Jones is absent for this sketch due to no longer being a part of the cast.

== Travel Expert Carrie Krum ==
Played by Aidy Bryant, Carrie Krum is a 7th grader who appears on Weekend Update as a travel expert, usually reporting on where she went on a school trip or on her summer vacation.

Season	Episode	Host	Notes
44	December 8, 2018	Jason Momoa	
44	April 13, 2019	Emma Stone	
45	January 25, 2020	Adam Driver	
46	October 3, 2020	Chris Rock	

== Name Change Office ==
A correspondent (Mikey Day) for Action 9 News at Five (which is itself a recurring sketch) covers a disaster that happened at the city's name change office. The reporter interviews people who were intending to change their embarrassing names but couldn't due to the disaster. The interviewed victims' names are usually played for comic effect, usually resembling an inappropriate, sexual term (such as Mike Rodick, for "microdick") or the name of a well-known criminal (for example, Jeffrey Epstein). Pete Davidson also plays an essential worker that laughs at the names at a press conference (usually held by the host).

Season	Episode	Host	Notes
44	January 19, 2019	Rachel Brosnahan	"Eye on NorCal: Ceiling collapse at name change office". A reporter Randall Fields (Day) interviews people who were intending to change their names but couldn't due to an earthquake, such as Donald McRonald (Kenan Thompson) and Mark Peanus (Kyle Mooney).
46	October 3, 2020	Chris Rock	"Eye on Pittsburgh: Superspreader event at name change office". A reporter Dylan Bertram (Day) interviews people who were intending to change their names but couldn't due to a COVID-19 superspreading event, such as Edith Puthie (Ego Nwodim) and Mike Rodick (Beck Bennett).

== Nico Slobkin and Brie Bacardi ==
A seemingly ideal couple (Mikey Day and Heidi Gardner) constantly bicker on Weekend Update.

Season	Episode	Host	Notes
44	February 9, 2019	Halsey	
44	April 13, 2019	Emma Stone	

== Ultimate Baking Championship ==
Four contestants—Sandy (Heidi Gardner), Ralph (Kyle Mooney), another cast member, and the host—on a baking competition show present their confections to judges and the host, usually horribly-made cakes resembling popular characters that look nothing like the intended product. Alex Moffat plays the show's host, and Aidy Bryant, Beck Bennett, and Ego Nwodim play the judges.

Season	Episode	Host	Notes
44	February 16, 2019	Don Cheadle	Leslie Jones plays the fourth contestant. Kenan Thompson voices Cheadle's cake.
45	December 21, 2019	Eddie Murphy	Holiday Baking Championship; Cecily Strong plays the fourth contestant. Kate McKinnon briefly voices Murphy's cake.
46	December 12, 2020	Timothée Chalamet	Holiday Baking Championship; Lauren Holt plays the fourth contestant. Cecily Strong plays a judge in place of Aidy Bryant.
47	November 20, 2021	Simu Liu	Thanksgiving Baking Championship; Sarah Sherman plays the fourth contestant. Pete Davidson plays a judge in place of Beck Bennett.
50	November 16, 2024	Charli XCX	Thanksgiving Baking Championship; Michael Longfellow and Ashley Padilla play judges in place of Aidy Bryant and Pete Davidson. Charli XCX, Marcello Hernández, and former cast member Kyle Mooney as contestants. Hosted by Andrew Dismukes in place of Alex Moffat.

== Supercentenarian Mort Fellner ==
Mort Fellner (Mikey Day) reports on supercentenarian news, always involving the death of a supercentenarian.

Season	Episode	Host	Notes
44	February 16, 2019	Don Cheadle	
45	October 5, 2019	Phoebe Waller-Bridge	

== Line Dancing ==
Daniel (played by John Mulaney) feels nervous at his partner Lisa's (played by Ego Nwodim) family event, but when they begin line dancing, he seems to know different lyrics and friends more than her.

Season	Episode	Host	Notes
44	March 2, 2019	John Mulaney	The couple dance the "Cha Cha Slide" at a wedding reception.
47	February 26, 2022	John Mulaney	The couple dance the "Cupid Shuffle" at Lisa's family reunion.

== Smokery Farms ==
Vaneta and Wylene Starkie (Kate McKinnon and Aidy Bryant) show meat products from their brand Smokery Farms and tell outlandish stories behind them.

Season	Episode	Host	Notes
44	March 2, 2019	John Mulaney	
45	November 2, 2019	Kristen Stewart	
46	April 3, 2021	Daniel Kaluuya	

== Henriette and Nan ==
Two receptionists (Kate McKinnon and Aidy Bryant) struggle with technology.

Season	Episode	Host	Notes
44	March 9, 2019	Idris Elba	Henriette and Nan work with PowerPoint.
45	April 11, 2020	Tom Hanks	The company works around their first Zoom call.

== Terry Fink ==
A film critic (Alex Moffat) reviews movies by "microdosing" on LSD.

Season	Episode	Host	Notes
44	April 6, 2019	Kit Harington	
47	October 9, 2021	Kim Kardashian	
47	March 12, 2022	Zoë Kravitz	

== What's Wrong with This Picture? ==
Three dense contestants try to guess what is wrong with a picture in a game show hosted by Elliott Pants (Kenan Thompson).

Season	Episode	Host	Notes
44	May 18, 2019	Paul Rudd	
45	October 5, 2019	Phoebe Waller-Bridge	
45	May 9, 2020	Kristen Wiig	
46	April 10, 2021	Carey Mulligan	

Preceded by Recurring Saturday Night Live characters and sketches introduced 2017–2018	Recurring Saturday Night Live characters and sketches (listed chronologically)	Succeeded by Recurring Saturday Night Live characters and sketches introduced 2019–20
