= Recurring Saturday Night Live characters and sketches introduced 2016–17 =

The following is a list of recurring Saturday Night Live characters and sketches introduced during the forty-second season of SNL, which began on October 1, 2016.

== Action 9 News At Five ==
Television reporters interview survivors of a calamity, but the focus shifts to the survivors' quirks. The "Name Change Office" became a recurring sketch within the larger "Action 9 News at Five" recurring sketch.

Season	Episode	Host	Notes
42	October 1, 2016	Margot Robbie	"Eye on Tampa: Sinkhole opens downtown". The news reporters are baffled to learn that Alexandra Kennedy-Schatt (Robbie), a beautiful, rich woman from the Kennedy dynasty, is married to the very average Matt Schatt (Day). The Matt Schatt character became the subject of a separate recurring sketch, where his marriage to an exceptional woman continues to puzzle others.
43	December 2, 2017	Saoirse Ronan	"Eye on Phoenix: Gas leak at the American Girl Store". Customer Thomas Dean (Day) tries and fails to convince the reporters that the doll he was about to buy was a gift for someone else.
44	January 19, 2019	Rachel Brosnahan	"Eye on NorCal: Ceiling collapse at name change office". A reporter Randall Fields (Day) interviews people who were intending to change their embarrassing names but couldn't due to the disaster, such as Donald McRonald (Kenan Thompson) and Mark Peanus (Kyle Mooney).
46	October 3, 2020	Chris Rock	"Eye on Pittsburgh: Superspreader event at name change office". A reporter Dylan Bertram (Day) interviews people who were intending to change their embarrassing names but couldn't due to a COVID-19 superspreading event, such as Edith Puthie (Ego Nwodim) and Mike Rodick (Beck Bennett).

== Matt Pat Schatt ==
An unimpressive man's (Mikey Day) marriage to a beautiful woman, played by the host, confuses everyone who interacts with them.

Season	Episode	Host	Notes
42	October 1, 2016	Margot Robbie	News reporters from Action 9 News at Five (Kenan Thompson, Cecily Strong, Beck Bennett, and Leslie Jones) are distracted from reporting on a sinkhole and sports when they learn that bystander Alexandra Kennedy-Schatt (Robbie), a beautiful, rich woman from the Kennedy dynasty, is married to the very average Matt Schatt (Day). The "Action 9 News at Five" became a separate recurring sketch, where the reporters were distracted from newsworthy events by other quirks of witnesses.
45	December 7, 2019	Jennifer Lopez	HGTV host Becker Cheeks (Thompson) and staff (Bennett, Bowen Yang) give a surprise home makeover to Schatt and his wife Jacqueline (Lopez), a beautiful human rights lawyer. She allows him to have other sexual partners to better "meet his needs," despite his unemployment and obsession with Smurfs.
48	April 15, 2023	Ana de Armas	Game show host Ted Connelly (Thompson) introduces Schatt and his third wife Carmen (Ana de Armas) as contestants on the Dome. She is employed as a dancer in the oldest ballet company in the country, and Schatt is working as a volunteer dog food taste tester. Schatt is also revealed to have "dozens" of nipples.

== Debette Goldry ==
Kate McKinnon plays an elderly actress, introduced as "the incomparable Debette Goldry," who talks about how hard her life was during the Golden Era of Hollywood.

Season	Episode	Host	Notes
42	October 1, 2016	Margot Robbie	Goldry appears at a roundtable with Keira Knightley (Robbie), Marion Cotillard (Cecily Strong) and Lupita Nyong'o (Sasheer Zamata). Karen Domineau senior writer at Glamour.com (Aidy Bryant) moderates.
42	December 3, 2016	Emma Stone	Goldry appears at a panel with Leslie Jones, Stone and Jennifer Aniston, all playing themselves. Cecilia Prince Director of Programming at the Paley Center for Media (Zamata) moderates.
42	May 13, 2017	Melissa McCarthy	Goldry appears at a panel with Marion Cotillard (Strong), Lupita Nyong'o (Zamata) and another elderly actress named Gaye Fontaine (McCarthy). Jen Freeman of Film Society Lincoln Center (Vanessa Bayer) moderates.
43	October 14, 2017	Kumail Nanjiani	In midst of the allegations surrounding Harvey Weinstein, Goldry appears at a panel with Marion Cotillard (Strong) and Viola Davis (Jones). Karen Domineau associate editor at Glamour.com (Bryant) moderates.
44	October 6, 2018	Awkwafina	Goldry appears at a panel with Marion Cotillard (Strong), Allison Janney (Heidi Gardner), and Sandra Oh (Awkwafina). Karen Domineau weekend editor at Glamour.com (Bryant) moderates.

== Melania Moments ==
A series of short vignettes with Melania Trump (Cecily Strong) contemplating things that happen in her life. Beck Bennett narrates. Written by Julio Torres.

Season	Episode	Host	Notes
42	October 1, 2016	Margot Robbie	No. 27: "The Passerby"
42	October 8, 2016	Lin-Manuel Miranda	No. 78: "The Dream"
42	October 15, 2016	Emily Blunt	No. 102: "The Housemaid"

== David S. Pumpkins ==
Friends enter a horror themed ride, where the operator (Kenan Thompson) opens various doors that initially reveal horror characters that scare them. The doors then open to reveal David S. Pumpkins, a man wearing a black and orange pumpkin-themed suit (Tom Hanks), and his two dancing skeleton sidekicks (Mikey Day, Bobby Moynihan), which the friends find unscary and confusing.

Season	Episode	Host	Notes
42	October 22, 2016	Tom Hanks	
42	May 20, 2017	Dwayne Johnson	Tom Hanks appears briefly as David S. Pimpkins, with similar mannerisms and clothes as David S. Pumpkins, in the pre-recorded video "Rap Song"
48	October 29, 2022	Jack Harlow	

== Leslie & Kyle love story ==
A mockumentary series depicting the fictional romance between Leslie Jones and Kyle Mooney, and the love triangle that forms between them and Colin Jost.

Season	Episode	Host	Notes
42	November 12, 2016	Dave Chappelle	Leslie and Kyle fall in love, with Leslie taking Kyle's virginity in the process.
42	December 3, 2016	Emma Stone	Leslie and Kyle hug and kiss in the monologue, which causes Stone to call it "old love".
42	February 11, 2017	Alec Baldwin	Leslie auditions for the role of Donald Trump. Her and Kyle's relationship is briefly shown.
42	May 13, 2017	Melissa McCarthy	After marrying and having a son together, Leslie and Kyle's relationship is on the rocks as she spends more time with Colin.
43	November 11, 2017	Tiffany Haddish	Leslie and Kyle's relationship takes a toll on Kyle and Beck Bennett's friendship. Writer Gary Richardson appears as Leslie and Kyle's son, Little Lorne.
44	September 29, 2018	Adam Driver	Inspired by Pete Davidson's relationship with Ariana Grande, Kyle dumps Leslie for Wendy Williams and debuts an edgy new look that is very similar to that of Davidson's. Jones does not appear in the sketch except in a picture with her face cut out.
44	May 18, 2019	Paul Rudd	After it's revealed that the prior sketches were all fiction, Kyle and Leslie watch them and fall in love for real. This was the last of these sketches, as Jones left the show after this episode.

A precursor to the sketches, Kyle vs Kanye, was aired on February 13, 2016, during the season 41 episode hosted by Melissa McCarthy. Another sketch, New Cast Member, with Mooney playing both himself and a rarely-featured cast member, was cut for time from the season 44 episode hosted by Idris Elba. New Cast Member featured Jones and had a similar premise to the above sketches, but no mention was made of their relationship. These sketches stopped after season 44, since Jones left the show at the end of the season, but there are several more similar sketches, including one from season 45, titled "Kyle's Transformation", where Kyle transforms his body, so he can get into a sketch about male strippers. There are two of these from season 46, with the sketch "Dancer", with host Issa Rae, where Mooney proves to Rae that he could be Justin Bieber (who was that episode's musical guest)’s backup dancer, only to have his dreams cut short, and in another sketch, but was cut for time, titled "Kyle and Friends" (host Regina King), Mooney reevaluates how he fits in at the world of SNL by putting himself out there. From season 47, there's "Kyle's Holiday", where Billie Eilish served as host and musical guest. In the sketch, Mooney reflects on those that bring him joy, while trying to find Christmas plans. The second one being "Serious Night Live", where host Jake Gyllenhaal and Michael Che uncover some of Mooney's problems in a new dramatic, non-comedy series, 'Serious Night Live', those were the last of those sketches, as Mooney left at the end of season 47.

== Posters ==
Pete Davidson plays a student with posters (for example, characters from a Black Panther-like superhero movie) in his room. He dreams about them telling him not to drop out of school, instead helping him work hard and focus on his studies. However, one such poster is of airheaded glamour model Krissy Knox (Emma Stone), who instead focuses on the product she is posing with.

Season	Episode	Host	Notes
42	December 3, 2016	Emma Stone	Snowboarder Dillon Stanley (Mikey Day), an unnamed video game character (Kate McKinnon) and stand-up comedian Walton P. (Kenan Thompson) tell Shaun (Davidson) not to drop out of school. However, Krissy is only focusing on seductively eating a hot dog.
44	April 13, 2019	Emma Stone	Shaun, now in college, is educated by rapper Lil' Percocet (Day), superheroes Black Puma (Thompson) and Jaguara (Ego Nwodim) and wrestler Mad Dog Dugan (Beck Bennett) on why history isn't a boring subject to study. However, Krissy is only focusing on seductively pouring water onto herself with a garden hose.
49	December 2, 2023	Emma Stone	Marcello Hernández struggles with his physics homework while David Beckham (Day), wrestler Troy McCoy (Thompson), and an unnamed video game character (Nwodim) attempt to demonstrate how physics are used in their daily lives. Krissy also shows off how she uses physics, mostly involving her seductively bending over the car she is working on.

== Pete Davidson's First Impressions ==
Pete Davidson critiques the looks of various people involved in politics.

Season	Episode	Host	Notes
42	January 14, 2017	Felicity Jones	Pete critiques Donald Trump's picks for the Supreme Court.
42	March 11, 2017	Scarlett Johansson	Pete critiques people involved in the Trump administration.
44	November 3, 2018	Jonah Hill	Pete critiques politicians running for office in the 2018 midterm elections. Include an infamous joke about future Rep. Dan Crenshaw.

== Dirty Talk ==
A woman (Melissa Villasenor) attempts to talk dirty with her boyfriend (played by the host), but ends up unintentionally turning him off with inappropriate methods.

Season	Episode	Host	Notes
42	January 21, 2017	Aziz Ansari	
43	May 5, 2018	Donald Glover	

== Guy Who Just Bought A Boat ==
Alex Moffat plays a man who uses slang to show that he is wealthy, which compensates for his small penis.

Season	Episode	Host	Notes
42	February 11, 2017	Alec Baldwin	Valentine’s Day themed dating tips
43	September 30, 2017	Ryan Gosling	Gosling appears as his cousin, "Guy Who Just Joined Soho House"
43	December 16, 2017	Kevin Hart	Christmas themed dating tips
44	February 9, 2019	Halsey	Respectful Valentine’s Day themed dating tips
45	November 23, 2019	Will Ferrell	Ryan Reynolds appears as "Guy Who Knows the Owner"
46	April 3, 2021	Daniel Kaluuya	Post-Covid dating tips
47	October 23, 2021	Jason Sudeikis	Halloween themed dating tips (cut for time)
47	January 22, 2022	Will Forte	Football tailgating tips. Pete Davidson also appears to comment on the news that he and Jost bought a Staten Island Ferry.
47	May 21, 2022	Natasha Lyonne	Romantic summer travel tips. Last sketch, as Moffat left the show following this episode.

== The Duncans ==
Leslie Jones and Mikey Day play a couple who discuss their sex lives on Weekend Update.

Season	Episode	Host	Notes
42	February 11, 2017	Alec Baldwin	The Duncans discuss their experience with trying S&M.
43	December 2, 2017	Saoirse Ronan	The Duncans talk about their usage of the Kama Sutra.

== Eric and Donald Trump Jr. ==
Eric (Alex Moffat) and Donald Jr. (Mikey Day) talk to Colin Jost on Weekend Update to discuss their father's actions, but Eric's cluelessness interrupts his brother's arguments. The brothers have also appeared outside of Weekend Update.

Season	Episode	Host	Premise
42	March 4, 2017	Octavia Spencer	Donald Jr. talks about their father's involvement in the Trump Organization, and the opening of their new golf course in Dubai. Eric has difficulty opening a bottle of Capri Sun juice.
SE	August 10, 2017	N/A	Donald Jr. and Eric discuss their summer plans, including a new Trump hotel. Eric discovers the fidget spinner.
43	November 4, 2017	Larry David	Donald Jr. discusses Paul Manafort's indictment, and Eric discovers Fun Dip.
43	November 18, 2017	Chance the Rapper	Eric and Donald Jr. meet with Julian Assange for files involving Hillary Clinton. This sketch was the cold open of the episode.
43	March 10, 2018	Sterling K. Brown	Eric and Donald Jr. discuss the allegations of chaos in the White House following numerous staff resignations. Eric attempts to read through a pop-up book.
43	May 19, 2018	Tina Fey	Donald Jr. talks about who he called in the middle of a Trump Tower meeting, and Eric eats Play-Doh.
44	October 6, 2018	Awkwafina	Donald Jr. talks about the upcoming midterms, and Eric interacts with a puppet.
45	October 26, 2019	Chance the Rapper	Donald Jr. argues about the lack of benefits from their father's presidency, and Eric plays with a pin screen.
46	October 17, 2020	Issa Rae	Donald Jr. discusses their father's chances of reelection, while Eric plays with hand sanitizer and meets his sister Tiffany (Chloe Fineman)

== Dog Translator ==
Three scientists, Helen (Scarlett Johansson) and two associates (Mikey Day and Kyle Mooney) demonstrate a machine that can translate animals' thoughts. The presentation is derailed by the machine's apparently accurate broadcasting of Helen's dog Max's (voice of Beck Bennett) arguments in favor of Donald Trump and his policies, as well as Max's criticism of Helen's lifestyle and her decision to neuter him. Helen and the project's investors (Cecily Strong and Alex Moffat) are horrified.

Season	Episode	Host	Notes
42	March 11, 2017	Scarlett Johansson	Helen's dog reveals himself to be a Trump Supporter.
45	December 14, 2019	Scarlett Johansson	Helen's dog is no longer a Trump Supporter but argues that the Democratic Party can't figure out who should be the nominee. Everyone has a different opinion over who it should be.

== Dawn Lazarus ==
Weekend Update's nervous and inexperienced meteorologist Dawn Lazarus (Vanessa Bayer) presents the weather in an incomprehensible manner. The character was very short lived, as it was introduced in the third-to-last episode of Bayer's last season; she had been trying to develop the concept since earlier that year.

Season	Episode	Host	Notes
42	May 6, 2017	Chris Pine	
42	May 20, 2017	Dwayne Johnson	Bayer left the show after this appearance.
43	March 10, 2018	Sterling K. Brown	Cameo appearance by Bayer.

== Morning Joe ==
Joe Scarborough (Alex Moffat) and Mika Brzezinski (Kate McKinnon) host their morning news talk show. They display flirtatious behavior that baffles their in-studio guests, including Willie Geist (Mikey Day). When interviewing their via-satellite guests, they bombard them with questions without letting them give their answers. The sketch also parodies Scarborough's love for classic rock music.

Season	Episode	Host	Notes
42	May 6, 2017	Chris Pine	
43	January 13, 2018	Sam Rockwell	Fred Armisen and Bill Murray appear as Michael Wolff and Steve Bannon, respectively.
43	May 19, 2018	Tina Fey	
44	December 1, 2018	Claire Foy	

Preceded by Recurring Saturday Night Live characters and sketches introduced 2015–16	Recurring Saturday Night Live characters and sketches (listed chronologically)	Succeeded by Recurring Saturday Night Live characters and sketches introduced 2017–18
