= Recurring Saturday Night Live characters and sketches introduced 2003–04 =

The following is a list of recurring Saturday Night Live characters and sketches introduced between October 4, 2003, and May 15, 2004, the twenty-ninth season of SNL.

== The Barry Gibb Talk Show ==
A Jimmy Fallon and Justin Timberlake sketch. Debuted October 11, 2003.

== Mascots ==
Featured only in episodes where Justin Timberlake has either hosted, performed as musical guest, or both, Timberlake takes to the sidewalk as a costumed street advertiser (ex: man dressed as chicken to promote fried chicken chain) to upstage an existing street vendor in a competing business. Naturally, Timberlake outstages the previous person by parodying current contemporary hits (with his boombox), followed immediately by the signature slogan "Bring it on down to ______ville". Debuted October 11, 2003.

Appearances

| Season | Episode | Host | Notes |
|---|---|---|---|
| 29 | October 11, 2003 | Justin Timberlake | "Omeletteville" (breakfast restaurant, dressed as an omelette) opposed by Chris Parnell, dressed as bacon and eggs. |
| 32 | December 16, 2006 | Justin Timberlake | "Homelessville" (homeless mission, dressed as a cup of soup) opposed by Will Forte working for Salvation Army, dressed as Santa Claus. |
| 34 | November 15, 2008 | Paul Rudd | "Turkeyville" In the episode in which Justin Timberlake doesn't host, he appears on Weekend Update and says he would have done this for Thanksgiving. |
| 34 | May 9, 2009 | Justin Timberlake | "Plasticville" (plastic surgery practice, dressed as silicone breast implant) opposed by Will Forte working for a gym, dressed as a dumbbell. |
| 36 | May 21, 2011 | Justin Timberlake | "Liquorville" (Liquor store, dressed up as beer bottle, accompanied by Lady Gaga dressed as a bottle of wine, against a tea shop promoted by a character played by Kristen Wiig). |
| 38 | March 9, 2013 | Justin Timberlake | "Veganville" (Vegan restaurant, dressed as a block of tofu) opposed by Bobby Moynihan as an Italian butcher promoting sausage. |
| 39 | December 21, 2013 | Jimmy Fallon | "Wrappingville" (Gift wrapping store dressed as a roll of wrapping paper, accompanied by Jimmy Fallon dressed as a gift bag) opposed by Aidy Bryant as a competing gift-wrapping kiosk. |

== Billy Smith ==
Billy Smith (played by Fred Armisen) is a Native American comedian who has performed stand-up on three Weekend Update episodes and made a small appearance in Liam Neeson's monologue in 2004. His jokes usually begin as fairly average stand-up jokes (for instance, "why did the chicken cross the road?"), but his punchlines suddenly veer into obscure references to Native American culture. This of course results only in confusion and nervous titters from the audience, at which point Billy Smith patiently explains the cultural reference so that the audience can understand the joke. Debuted October 18, 2003.

== Starkisha & Appreciante ==
A Finesse Mitchell and Maya Rudolph sketch. Debuted October 18, 2003.

== Spy Glass ==
Spy Glass is a UK-based version of Access Hollywood where Seth Meyers and Amy Poehler play reporters who gossip about celebrities inside and outside their hometown. Meyers' character, Ian Gerrard, would make repeated bad puns about celebrity current events, while Poehler's character, Zoe Anderton, would make thinly veiled confessions to stalking celebrities. American reporters Pat O'Brien (Jimmy Fallon) and Gene Shalit (Horatio Sanz) would make guest appearances, pretending to be British before immediately being revealed.

Episodes:

- November 1, 2003 - Kelly Ripa as Geri Halliwell (Ginger Spice of the Spice Girls)
- February 14, 2004 - Drew Barrymore as Jenny Belvedere
- January 22, 2005 - Paul Giamatti as Rupert Smythe Pennington
- April 9, 2005 - Cameron Diaz as Edwina Peppermint

A sketch on the May 1, 2004 dress rehearsal featured Lindsay Lohan as a teen beat correspondent, but was cut before broadcast.

== Terrell and his wife ==
A pair of characters played by then-writers J. B. Smoove and Paula Pell, who would frequently turn up in the audience during monologues. Debuted November 1, 2003.

== Dave "Zinger" Clinger ==
A Seth Meyers sketch. Debuted November 15, 2003.

== Scheinwald Studios ==
A Rachel Dratch sketch. Debuted November 15, 2003. Abe Scheinwald (Rachel Dratch) is the elderly and perhaps somewhat senile head of Scheinwald Studios, a producer of low-budget exploitation films. His credo is "Double D's (makes a hand gesture indicating large women's breasts) – double 'deze' (holds up a wad of cash)", indicating that he's only interested in making poor quality movies populated with busty actresses. Abe is usually shown eating a big container of cole slaw whenever he thinks he shouldn't be paying attention to something.

His grandson, Brad Scheinwald (Seth Meyers), is attempting to turn his grandfather's studio into a producer of quality films. Through the course of the sketches, we learn that Abe Scheinwald has passed on numerous blockbusters that Brad had attempted to encourage him to back, including Titanic, The Lord of the Rings trilogy, The Matrix trilogy, and many others, allowing other studios to successfully back them, much to the ever-increasing frustration of Brad.

Appearances:

- November 15, 2003: Host Alec Baldwin. Baldwin plays Alan Scheinwald, Abe's son and Brad's father. He sides with Abe Scheinwald in wanting to make low budget exploitation films rather than quality movies.
- May 8, 2004: Host Snoop Dogg. Snoop Dogg, playing himself, pitches his movie idea, "Booty Hotel" to Abe, which he loves, and of course, Brad hates.
- December 18, 2004: Host Robert De Niro. Brad and Abe argue about the direction of the studio at the Weekend Update desk.
- October 22, 2005: Host Catherine Zeta-Jones. Brad meets secretly with a fictional critically acclaimed actress (played by Amy Poehler) to discuss a serious script but is discovered and thwarted by Grandpa Abe who proposes to morph the script into an exploitation film starring a slutty actress (played by Zeta-Jones).

== Appalachian Emergency Room ==
Appalachian Emergency Room is a recurring sketch that debuted on January 10, 2004 (an episode hosted by Jennifer Aniston) and draws on redneck stereotypes.

=== Recurring characters ===
- The emergency room receptionist (Seth Meyers in a blond mullet wig) has appeared in every sketch so far. He simply sits at the desk and plays the straight man to the other characters. He is also portrayed as relatively articulate and intelligent. On the Matt Dillon/Arctic Monkeys episode, the receptionist's name is revealed to be Nerod.
- Willie Tater (Fred Armisen) only appeared in two installments of Appalachian Emergency Room: on the Liam Neeson/Modest Mouse episode he comes in with an ice pack on his crotch, explaining that his penis slipped into a deep fryer while he was making breakfast; and on the Lindsay Lohan/Coldplay episode he has an ice pack on his face after playing "Star Wars" with his brother, using curling irons as lightsabers.
- Mrs. Denmont (Maya Rudolph) and her son Jake (Kenan Thompson) have appeared in the majority of the sketches. The first time Rudolph's character was shown was in the Ben Affleck/N*E*R*D episode in Season 29. In that episode, she was not called Mrs. Denmont, her son was a white boy with a mullet instead of Kenan Thompson's "Jake" character, and she came in with a tampon machine stuck to her hand (revealing that she got it stuck while trying to fish out the tampon when the machine ate her quarter). It wasn't until the episode hosted by Snoop Dogg (also in season 29) that Maya Rudolph's character was paired up with Kenan's Jake character and that she was known as Mrs. Denmont. In the Matt Dillon/Arctic Monkeys episode, Rudolph and Thompson play the same characters, but their names are changed.
- Netty Bo Dance (Amy Poehler) and Percy Bo Dance (Darrell Hammond), elderly tenants of a trailer park, appear in every sketch so far. Percy always explains an injury he sustained from his druggie son (played by Neil Young in the Jack Black/Neil Young episode, but was never shown before that episode and hasn't been shown since). Based on his explanation, it always appears that Netty should have also sustained severe injury, yet only Percy ever appears to be hurt. Netty Bo Dance has a very slow, humorous shuffle-walk, and frequently declares that she will keep the hospital gown as a dress.
- Tyler (Chris Parnell) appears in nearly every sketch, and is greeted by the receptionist with the question, "What is it this time, Tyler?" Tyler proceeds to explain how some implausible object has wedged its way into his anus (although in the Jack Black/Neil Young episode, Tyler actually has a gift-wrapped watermelon stuck to his penis). In the Ben Affleck/N*E*R*D episode, Tyler explains that it is a canister of Axe Body Spray, and that if he moves in a certain way, he "can still make it spray." In the May 21, 2005 episode, he re-emerges from the examination room that he was sent to and declares that he now has "about 20 cotton balls" up his rectum ("It's OK, though," he adds, "they're in a glass jar!")

=== Episodes featuring Appalachian Emergency Room ===
- January 10, 2004: host Jennifer Aniston as Taytay Phillips, a pregnant woman brought in after she fell on a toilet seat after jackknifing off a Big Wheel.
- March 13, 2004: host Ben Affleck as Rusty Kofich, a trucker whose ferret bit him in the crotch while he fed his ferrets naked
- May 8, 2004: host Snoop Dogg as Booker Fricky, a man who injured his arm while going down a pool slide (and, in the dress rehearsal version shown on the cable reruns and on Netflix, has a large family consisting of both black and white people following him into the emergency room)
- November 13, 2004: host Liam Neeson as Marlon Weaver, a trucker who got seven hypodermic needles in his back after he and his fellow trucker (played by Rob Riggle) crashed their truck
- May 21, 2005: host Lindsay Lohan as Jerica-Lynn Dubette, a high-school dropout dressed as a cheerleader searching for employment who "pops her cooter-bone" doing a high kick.
- December 17, 2005: host Jack Black as Sandy Joey Jefferson, a man dressed as Joseph as part of a live Nativity exhibit which somehow degenerated into a farting contest - he's afraid he ripped his "pooty-pucker" in attempting to produce the loudest fart, Neil Young as Percy and Netty Bodance's oft-mentioned druggie son, and Johnny Knoxville as himself (who comes in with a 2x4 nailed to his "ABC" or "ass-ball connection")
- March 11, 2006: host Matt Dillon as Perdy Spotly, a fast-talking con man who chats with the receptionist while his wife (who works as a stripper) steals a car in the parking lot.
  - NOTE: There was supposed to be an Appalachian Emergency Room sketch on the Peyton Manning/Carrie Underwood episode in season 32 (despite that Chris Parnell isn't there to play frequent patient Tyler), where Manning interrupts the sketch to speak out against its redneck stereotyping, but it never appeared in the live show airing.

== The Prince Show ==
The Prince Show is a sketch parodying the memorable performance of Prince and Beyoncé at the 46th Grammy Awards. The sketch features Fred Armisen as the host, playing Prince, and with Maya Rudolph as his co-host, Beyoncé. The opening theme song of the show features Prince playing his famous purple guitar with his famed symbol. After the song is over, the two head to a purple couch, which coincides with much of the rest of the set, which is also purple. Prince rarely says much on the show, usually whispering into Beyoncé's ear what he wants to say. Prince usually has two guests. Prince soon gets tired of his first guest, and whispers into Beyoncé's ear. Beyoncé tells the guest that Prince wants him/her to do something outrageous and the guest usually complies. During most of the sketches, Prince vanishes during an important conversation. The guest asks Beyoncé, "Hey, where did Prince go?" Beyoncé tells the guest that Prince is nearby doing unrelated activities such as sculpting or painting. After Prince brings out his second guest, the first one tells Prince he or she was enjoying doing whatever ridiculous activity that Prince made him/her do. Debuted February 14, 2004.

An installment of this sketch appeared on the season 31 episode hosted by Steve Martin with the real Prince as musical guest. The genuine article did not appear in the sketch.

Appearances:

- Feb. 14, 2004: Host Drew Barrymore as P!nk.
- Apr. 10, 2004: Host Janet Jackson as Paula Abdul.
- Oct. 9, 2004: Host Queen Latifah as Patti LaBelle.
- Dec. 18, 2004: Host Robert De Niro
- May 21. 2005: Host Lindsay Lohan as Jessica Simpson.
- Feb. 4, 2006: Host Steve Martin as Prince's personal chef. The real Prince was this episode's musical guest and the writers wanted him to appear as Prince's (Armisen's) reflection in a mirror, but he refused. They decided to go with the sketch anyway (simply using an actual mirror).
- Apr. 14, 2007: Host Shia LaBeouf as Tobey Maguire.

== Besos Y Lagrimas ==
Besos Y Lagrimas ("Kisses and Tears" in English) is a parody of telenovelas. The sketch shows scenes of an episode and typically involves exaggerated melodrama, soapy plot twists, and dramatic overacting. The sketches are spoken entirely in Spanish, without English subtitles. Fred Armisen plays one of the lead characters that recurs throughout the sketches. The sketch debuted on February 21, 2004.

Appearances:

- February 21, 2004: Host Christina Aguilera is Elena, a maid who is romantically involved with all of the other male characters in the telenovela.
- April 8, 2006: Host Antonio Banderas is Paolo, a hunky farmer who attracts the attentions of the female characters.
- February 27, 2010: Host Jennifer Lopez is Josefina, a nun who comes between Fred Armisen and Kristen Wiig's characters.

== ¡Show Biz Grande Explosion! ==
¡Show Biz Grande Explosion! is a recurring sketch featuring Fred Armisen as Fericito and Horatio Sanz as Manuel Pantalones, who are Latin-American entertainers and comedians.

¡Show Biz Grande Explosion! was launched as a vehicle for Armisen's Fericito character, a nightclub comedian from Venezuela, which had appeared three times on Saturday Night Live already and was quite popular. The sketch is presented as a Spanglish (although mostly English) show airing on "Univisión en English", and is a parody of Latin American variety shows such as Sabado Gigante. Strictly speaking, this is the only sketch Fericito has appeared in, although he has also been in monologues and on Weekend Update.

Manuel introduces Fericito and the bit. Fericito plays his timbales and asks the audience, "Did you feel it?" Fericito then goes into a monologue with jokes. At the end of each joke, he says "¡Ay Dios Mio!" and makes an exaggerated sad face. If someone becomes offended by a joke he makes, Fericito says, "I’m jus' kidding!" while shrugging. Often Manuel or the guest of the night is the butt of these jokes.

After his monologue, Fericito interviews a special guest. Often the guest is an outsider to Latin Culture who does not understand the nature or format of Fericito's jokes, or the guest him- or herself will try to crack a joke, which Fericito and Manuel do not find funny.

Episodes:

- March 6, 2004: host Colin Firth as himself
- May 8, 2004: host Snoop Dogg as himself
- December 11, 2004: host Colin Farrell as Bono
- October 8, 2005: host Jon Heder as himself

== Debbie Downer ==
A Rachel Dratch sketch. Debuted May 1, 2004.

== Kaitlin & Rick ==
Amy Poehler plays a hyperactive little girl who wears a Minnie Mouse shirt and thick glasses in the care of her beleaguered stepfather (Horatio Sanz). Debuted May 1, 2004. The theme of these sketches was how extremely opposite the personalities of the two main characters were. Pre-teen Kaitlin was extremely hyper, constantly chattering, rapidly running around, jumping on and over furniture, etc. By contrast her stepfather, Rick was completely laid back and calm. He was utterly indifferent to Kaitlin's hyper antics and extremely patient with her. In fact, he was portrayed as an extraordinarily patient and good stepfather. When he did apply discipline, it was in his super calm, laid back style.

It appeared that Amy Poehler would often deviate from the script and make Kaitlin even more out of control and hyper than originally scripted or rehearsed, in an attempt to make Horatio Sanz break. For example, in one sketch, Poehler pressed her face hard against Sanz' face, such that her forehead was on his temple, and her nose on his cheek, and in a croaking, frog-like voice, rapidly said, "rickrickrickrickrickrickrickrick...." until Sanz broke character and started laughing.

Kaitlin's catch phrase and schtick was to rapidly run in circles around Rick yelling his name, "Rick! Rick! Rick! Rick! Rick! Rick!"

If the episode's host was female, she played a friend of Kaitlin's. If male, he played a friend of Rick's. In either case the character played by the host was peppered with absurd, rapid fire questions by Kaitlin.

In the final installment of this sketch, Rick didn't appear, and host Molly Shannon played her mother (whom had never appeared before). Completely unlike Rick, her mother was every bit as hyper as Kaitlin, resulting in utterly out of control hyperness in this last sketch.

Appearances:

- May 1, 2004: Host Lindsay Lohan
- October 30, 2004: Host Kate Winslet
- January 22, 2005: Host Paul Giamatti
- April 16, 2005: Host Tom Brady
- October 8, 2005: Host Jon Heder
- May 6, 2006: Host Tom Hanks
- May 12, 2007: Host Molly Shannon (Shannon played Kaitlin's mother.)

== Jorge Rodriguez ==
An alleged expert on world events, Jorge Rodriguez is an aloof halfwit (played by Horatio Sanz) that constantly falls for the various hare-brained schemes of his friend Pepe. His catchphrase is "I'm looking for Pepe." Debuted May 1, 2004.

== Pat 'N Patti Silviac ==
Horatio Sanz and Maya Rudolph play Pat and Patti Silviac, owners of a small retail store. Debuted May 15, 2004. The object of these sketches appeared to be to challenge the writers to come up with dialog with the most occurrences of the sound "ack" in as few words as possible.

Pat and Patti would present an advertisement for their business in which the sound "ack" would appear incredibly frequently in the dialog, several times per sentence, on average. Example: "Pat 'n Patti's Backpack Shack is in Hackensack, smack dab behing the jog track".

All of their employees would have surnames that ended in the sound "ack" (as, of course, "Silviac" also did), although they would speak more naturally (as in, they didn't over-rely on the sound "ack" kind of naturally). The commercials would conclude with an invitation to visit their website, which had the fictional domain suffix ".ack".

Appearances:

- May 15, 2004: Hosts Mary-Kate and Ashley Olsen as employees Mattie and Jackie Halderback. Jimmy Fallon as employee Jack Kakinstack. Business: Pat 'n Patti's Backpack Shack.
- December 11, 2004: Host Colin Farrell as employee Zack Kakinstack. Business: Pat 'n Patti's Slacks, Snacks, and Knick Knack shack.

| Preceded by Recurring Saturday Night Live characters and sketches introduced 2002–03 | Recurring Saturday Night Live characters and sketches (listed chronologically) | Succeeded by Recurring Saturday Night Live characters and sketches introduced 2004–05 |
