= Canteen Boy =

Fictional character

Canteen Boy is a recurring Saturday Night Live character played by Adam Sandler. Canteen Boy is a naïve, childlike assistant scoutmaster with an acute attention to detail. He is always seen with a full scout's uniform and a canteen around his neck. Canteen Boy is routinely mocked by other characters in the sketch, who are well aware that their jokes will be lost on the character. It appears he lacks self-confidence, such as in one instance when he is called an idiot, he responds by calling the bully an idiot in return, only to claim he said nothing when the bully threatens him. His revenge toward these bullies often ties into his skills as an outdoorsman. Canteen Boy is a master at snake-calling, and he enjoys the television show Seaquest. He has also said in passing that he very much admires Cheryl Tiegs. A sketch would often end with either Canteen Boy finding a snake or his tormentors having to run away from a sudden onslaught of snakes. Sandler later stated that there is nothing wrong with Canteen Boy, rather he is "someone who has been in the Scouts too long". Although the word 'boy' in the character's name suggests he's a child, it has been made clear that Canteen Boy is actually a 27-year-old man who still lives with his mom and is still active in the Boy Scouts. Since he is overage to be an active Scout, he is actually a Scout leader. However this was contradicted in a brief bit where Chris Farley plays a fellow Scout, and it is assumed Farley was meant to be a teenager.

The season 19 Valentine's Day episode hosted by Alec Baldwin and Kim Basinger had a sketch where Baldwin played Mr. Armstrong, a scoutmaster who made overt sexual advances toward Canteen Boy. NBC received many complaints about the skit, saying that it was homophobic and trivialized pedophilia. Actual molestation did not occur, as Canteen Boy had clearly understood what was happening and was ill at ease with Mr. Armstrong's attitude. The sketch ends with Canteen Boy running off into the woods. The controversial sketch became the subject of Baldwin's monologue the next time he hosted on December 10, 1994.

In repeats and compilation videos, a disclaimer is added before the sketch that explicitly states that Canteen Boy is 27 years old and that the sketch is based on actual events (with some elements added in for dramatic effect).

Sandler later reworked Canteen Boy by amalgamating him with Cajun Man, another SNL character played by Sandler. Both characters were merged into the protagonist of Sandler's 1998 film The Waterboy.

== List of appearances ==
- March 13, 1993 host: John Goodman
- April 10, 1993 host: Jason Alexander
- October 9, 1993 host: Jeff Goldblum
- October 30, 1993 host: Christian Slater
- February 12, 1994 host: Alec Baldwin and Kim Basinger
- May 14, 1994 host: Heather Locklear
- December 10, 1994 host: Alec Baldwin (on Baldwin's monologue reenacting a more politically correct version of the notorious Canteen Boy sketch)

== See also ==
- Recurring Saturday Night Live characters and sketches
- The Waterboy
