= Matt Foley =

- Foley (Chris Farley) giving a speech to two teens (David Spade and Christina Applegate)
- First appearance: May 8, 1993
- Last appearance: October 25, 1997 (Farley); February 11, 2015 (McCarthy)
- Created by: Bob Odenkirk
- Portrayed by: Chris Farley (1993–1997); Melissa McCarthy (SNL 40th Anniversary Special)

In-universe information
- Occupation: • Motivational speaker • Prison inmate at Joliet Correctional Center (former) • Mall Santa (former)
- Spouse: Three ex-wives (first one named Linda, other two unnamed)

Matt Foley is a fictional character from the sketch comedy program Saturday Night Live performed by Chris Farley. Foley is a motivational speaker who exhibits characteristics atypical of someone in that position: whereas motivational speakers are usually successful and charismatic, Foley is abrasive, clumsy and down on his luck. The character's debut performance (May 8, 1993) has been called one of the best segments in SNL history.

== History ==
The character was conceived by Bob Odenkirk. Farley debuted the character during his tenure in The Second City comedy troupe prior to his joining the cast of Saturday Night Live. Farley named the character after one of his Marquette University rugby union teammates, an Army chaplain who became a Roman Catholic priest in the Chicago suburb of Arlington Heights. Reviewing the stage version of the sketch in 1990, the Chicago Reader wrote:

...even if he is imitating the loudmouth imbecile Sam Kinison to the decibel, Chris Farley is a stitch in "Motivation." He plays a scuzzy drug abuser hired by parents to scare their kids straight, a case of negative psychology taken over a cliff.

Matt Foley appeared in eight Saturday Night Live sketches. Each sketch typically started with Foley brought into a situation by someone to speak to a group. The sketches usually feature Farley's physical comedy, such as the over-caffeinated Foley gesticulating wildly and leaping around, often breaking furniture. At the end of each sketch, he is usually rushed out of his speaking location, where the people left behind huddle together and comment on him, usually bemused and frightened. Though his intended message is always ruined by his bizarre presentation, his results are usually successful as his audience changes their behavior so as to avoid further association with him.

The character's debut was so popular that Farley turned it into one of his best-known routines and one which he would repeat many times, both as Foley and as other characters on SNL and in film during the remainder of his life and career, sometimes injuring himself in the process.

Plans for a film version with David Spade in a supporting role were shelved after Farley's death in 1997.

== List of SNL episodes featured ==
- May 8, 1993 (host Christina Applegate) Matt Foley: Van Down By The River
- October 30, 1993 (host Christian Slater) Matt Foley: A Scary Story on Halloween
- December 11, 1993 (host Sally Field) Motivational Santa
- February 19, 1994 (host Martin Lawrence) Matt Foley: Scaring Kids Straight In Prison
- May 14, 1994 (host Heather Locklear) So Long, Farewell
- December 17, 1994 (host George Foreman)
- April 15, 1995 (host Courteney Cox) Cold Opening: Matt Foley
- October 25, 1997 (host Chris Farley) Matt Foley: at the Gym
- February 15, 2015 (40th Anniversary Special, played by Melissa McCarthy)

== Other appearances ==
Being a Wisconsin native, Farley was asked to portray the character at the 1994 Rose Bowl banquet. He delivered a comedic "motivational speech" to the Wisconsin Badgers football team, who were to face the UCLA Bruins that year and won the game, 21–16.

Farley appeared as Matt Foley on Late Night with Conan O'Brien on January 14, 1994.

In a 1997 guest appearance on All That, Farley appeared as Chef Farley opposite future SNL cast member Kenan Thompson in a "Cooking with Randy" sketch. He used many of Foley's mannerisms.

=== Parodies ===
In the third episode of season 20 of Family Guy, Peter Griffin dresses up very similar to the character on Halloween. When two children remark this, Peter claims he doesn't know him and is merely getting home from work. He heads inside and states he has "to do a dangerous speedball and become the least surprising death in Hollywood history," referencing Chris Farley's death.

== See also ==
- Recurring Saturday Night Live characters and sketches
