= Recurring Saturday Night Live characters and sketches introduced 2001–02 =

The following is a list of recurring Saturday Night Live characters and sketches introduced between September 29, 2001, and May 18, 2002, the twenty-seventh season of SNL.

== Donatella Versace ==
Maya Rudolph parodies fashion designer Donatella Versace. Donatella, a demanding diva, speaks in broken English and is always smoking or drinking champagne. She is usually surrounded by scantily clad manservants and hangs out with her celebrity friends like Elton John, Madonna, and Bono, or other designers. She gets easily impatient with her friends and guests, yelling, "Get ouutttt!" at them when they annoy her. In some sketches she hawks her own line of products, like Versace Hot Pockets and Versace Egg Nog. Debuted September 29, 2001.

Appearances

Season	Episode	Host	Notes
27	September 29, 2001	Reese Witherspoon	Donatella promotes her video "Donatella Versace For the Children." Her guests are Grace Jones (Dean Edwards), Karl Lagerfeld (Darrell Hammond), and John Galliano (Chris Kattan).
27	December 8, 2001	Hugh Jackman	Donatella welcomes Karl Lagerfeld (Mick Jagger), Steven Cojocaru (Jimmy Fallon), and her friend Ingo (Jackman).
27	March 16, 2002	Ian McKellen	Donatella hosts an Oscars party featuring Yves St. Laurent (McKellen), Elizabeth Hurley (Ana Gasteyer), and Bono (Chris Kattan).
28	October 4, 2002	Matt Damon	Donatella advertises Versace Hot Pockets, endorsed by her celebrity friends Rosie O'Donnell (Horatio Sanz), P. Diddy (Tracy Morgan), Farnsworth Bentley (Dean Edwards), and Axl Rose (Damon).
28	December 7, 2002	Robert De Niro	A Very Versace Chanukah. Donatella is visited by Siegfried (De Niro) and Roy (Harvey Keitel) and Sharon (Amy Poehler) and Ozzy Osbourne (Horatio Sanz).
28	March 15, 2003	Salma Hayek	Versace Oscar Fashion Preview. Donatella previews Oscars fashion with her assistant Adriana (Hayek). Christina Aguilera makes an appearance.
28	May 17, 2003	Dan Aykroyd	Donatella hosts her Backyard Barbecue, featuring Esteban (Aykroyd), Anna Nicole Smith (Ana Gasteyer), and David Letterman (Jeff Richards).
29	October 18, 2003	Halle Berry	Donatella hosts a Halloween party with Naomi Campbell (Berry) and Elton John (Horatio Sanz).
29	December 13, 2003	Elijah Wood	Donatella promotes Versace Egg Nog. Rosie O'Donnell (Horatio Sanz) and Boy George (Wood) stop by to promote the Broadway musical Taboo.
29	February 14, 2004	Drew Barrymore	Donatella celebrates Valentine's Day with special guests Courtney Love (Barrymore), Madonna (Amy Poehler), and Elton John (Horatio Sanz).
30	February 5, 2005	Paris Hilton	While skiing, Donatella runs into Paris Hilton.
30	May 7, 2005	Johnny Knoxville	Donatella celebrates Mother's Day with her mother (Rachel Dratch), Elton John (Horatio Sanz), and David Furnish (Knoxville).
32	February 3, 2007	Drew Barrymore	Donatella hosts a Super Bowl party with guests Victoria (Barrymore) and David Beckham (Seth Meyers) and Prince (Fred Armisen).

== Gay Hitler ==
Gay Hitler (Chris Kattan) was a character loosely based on a theory described in German historian Lothar Machtan's book The Hidden Hitler, which attempts to prove that Adolf Hitler was a homosexual. The flamboyant Hitler character was known for the catchphrase "Sprechen Sie dick?" Gay Hitler was the author of the fictional autobiography Mein Boyfriend, a satire of Hitler's actual autobiography Mein Kampf. Gay Hitler also appeared as Speed Skating Hitler, rendering the Sieg Heil salute repeatedly as he skated in place. His first appearance was on October 13, 2001.

A scene in the film Step Brothers shows fellow SNL cast member Will Ferrell dressed as a Nazi asking the antagonist "Sprechen sie dick?".

== She's The Girl With No Gaydar!!! ==
Rachel Dratch plays Nicole, a woman who is comically clueless about other people's orientations. The sketch begins and ends with a song-and-dance routine about Nicole's lack of gaydar. Debuted November 3, 2001.

Appearances:

- November 3, 2001: Host John Goodman plays Julius.
- April 13, 2002: Nicole tries to hit on men at a gay bar. Host The Rock plays Michael Anthony.
- November 16, 2002: Nicole goes to a loft party that is attended by mostly gay men. Host Brittany Murphy plays Wanda, a lesbian woman.

== America Undercover ==
An HBO show, similar to Fox's COPS series, where a white trash couple (played by Amy Poehler and Chris Kattan) fist fight and police (or other authority figures) are called in to break them up. Debuted November 3, 2001.

== Drunk Girl ==
Drunk Girl was played by Jeff Richards between 2001 and 2003. Drunk Girl would stop by Weekend Update to talk about things like Spring Break Tips, but she would be unreliable because of her slurred speech and emotional behavior. Her eyes are always squinted shut and she has shoulder-length blonde hair, and often a bared midriff. Among Drunk Girl's frequent mannerisms are telling people to "shut up!", whether they have actually said anything or not; bursting into tears for no reason; and offering to make out with a disinterested Jimmy Fallon or Tina Fey, the Update hosts at the time. Drunk Girl commonly asks people if they want to know something repeatedly, and when they say no, she increasingly slurs the words as she repeats the phrase (during the Weekend Update Halftime Special, even though Fallon said he wanted to know, she continued to repeat the phrase anyway). In later episodes, she also takes off her bra and/or lets something inappropriate, such as food, fall out of it. Debuted December 8, 2001.

== Astronaut Jones ==
A Tracy Morgan sketch. The sketch begins with a theme song, sung by Morgan in the style of a lounge singer. All sketches involve Astronaut Jones landing on other planets and encountering alien life forms. The aliens are usually female and give a long-winded speech to Jones about life on their planet, but Jones cannot focus on anything they are saying because he is too distracted by their breasts or other body parts. At the end of the aliens' speech, he then makes crude comments, like, "Let me slap those phat asses" and "I want to see it clap". Afterward, the credits roll ("Produced by Tracy Morgan and Melvin Goldfarb"), revealing that the theme song was longer than the show itself. Debuted February 2, 2002.

Appearances

Season	Episode	Host	Notes
27	February 7, 2002	Britney Spears	Jones encounters Kregelera (Spears).
27	April 6, 2002	Cameron Diaz	Jones lands on Jupiter and encounters the Jupiterians (Diaz, Maya Rudolph, and Amy Poehler).
28	November 16, 2002	Brittany Murphy	Jones is accompanied by Garrett Morris and musical guest Nelly. The trio encounter Bleeblora (Murphy).
28	May 17, 2003	Dan Aykroyd	Jones and his chief science officer (Aykroyd) encounter Venalla (Rudolph).
34	March 14, 2009	Tracy Morgan	Jones meets a Krilgarian trans woman (Andy Samberg).
41	October 17, 2015	Tracy Morgan	Jones and his crew encounter Martiana (musical guest Demi Lovato).

== The Leather Man ==
A Jimmy Fallon and Horatio Sanz sketch. The Leather Man (Fallon) is the owner of a store that sells only leather items. When customers browse items or try on outfits, the leather makes loud, squeaky noises. The Leather Man is aided by his assistant Choo Choo (Sanz), a bob cut-haired eccentric. Choo Choo makes frequent mistakes, which the Leather Man punishes him for by hitting him with a leather whip that makes Choo Choo cry out in exaggerated wails. Fallon and Sanz broke character in both appearances of the sketch. Debuted February 2, 2002.

Appearances:

- February 2, 2002: Host Britney Spears. Spears plays a customer and Dan Aykroyd makes a cameo appearance as Judge Lindenwell.
- November 16, 2002: Host Brittany Murphy. Murphy plays a customer.

== Amber, the One-Legged Hypoglycemic ==
An Amy Poehler sketch. Amber was "rockin' one leg" (as she described it). Poehler held one leg up behind her body so it would appear to have been amputated at the knee. She was impatient, bitchy, vulgar, dirty (literally "dirty" in that her clothes were covered with grime and she appeared not to bathe very often), and generally obnoxious. She saw herself as extremely sexy and desirable. Her catchphrase was, "Yeah, I farted. Jealous?!" Occasionally, another similarly boorish behavior would be substituted for "I farted". Apparently due to hypoglycemia, she would continuously munch on some unhealthy snack, usually a fatty fried food like french fries or potato chips throughout each sketch. The male characters in each sketch tended to appreciate her self-confidence, but fell well short of agreeing that she was sexy or desirable. She would never win the various beauty/popularity based contests that she would enter. Debuted March 2, 2002.

Appearances:

- March 2, 2002: Host Jonny Moseley. Amber and her equally obnoxious frenemy (Maya Rudolph) vie for the affections of a goofy young man (Moseley).
- May 18, 2002: Host Winona Ryder. Amber auditions to be a Playboy centerfold.
- November 2, 2002: Host Eric McCormack. Amber is a contestant on The Bachelor.
- May 15, 2004: Host Mary-Kate and Ashley Olsen. Amber appears on The Swan. While the other contestants on the show got radical plastic surgery makeovers (as was typical of that show), they essentially did nothing for Amber (which was OK with her, as she saw herself as perfect already). The Olsen twins appeared as contestant Vicki, as well as Vicki's reflection in a mirror.
- May 21, 2005: Host Lindsay Lohan. Amber is a contestant on America's Next Top Model.
- February 23, 2008: Host Tina Fey. Amber competes to become Bret Michaels' (played by Jason Sudeikis) wife on a reality program.
- September 25, 2010: Host Amy Poehler. Amber gets her own reality show on Showtime.

== The Ferey Muhtar Talk Show ==
The Ferey Muhtar Talk Show showed up only twice (season 27 on the March 16, 2002, episode hosted by Ian McKellen and again on the season 28 episode hosted by Nia Vardalos). It was a talk show from Turkey, with Horatio Sanz as Muhtar and Darrell Hammond as his sidekick, Tarik Ozekial. Muhtar would try (emphasis on try) to make small talk with his guests, but more often than not he would start engaging in bitter banter with Ozekial, tainting the experience for the guests. The show was a spoof of Turkish reality show Ateş Hattı, anchored by Reha Muhtar.

The first appearance of this sketch is famous for a goof involving Hammond's mustache nearly falling off, which Sanz saves by telling his guest (played by McKellen) "Well... it's a fake 'stache."

Preceded by Recurring Saturday Night Live characters and sketches introduced 2000–01	Recurring Saturday Night Live characters and sketches (listed chronologically)	Succeeded by Recurring Saturday Night Live characters and sketches introduced 2002–03
