= Writers Guild of America Award for Television: Best Comedy/Variety – Sketch Series =

Award presented by the Writers Guild of America

Writers Guild of America Award for Television: Comedy/Variety - Sketch Series
- Awarded for: Outstanding Writing in Comedy/Variety - Sketch Series
- Country: United States
- Presented by: Writers Guild of America
- Currently held by: Zach Kanin, Tim Robinson, John Solomon for I Think You Should Leave with Tim Robinson (2021)
- Website: www.wga.org

The Writers Guild of America Award for Television: Comedy/Variety - Sketch Series is an award presented by the Writers Guild of America to the best writing in a comedy/variety sketch series, until 2015, sketch series competed along with comedy/variety talk programs in the category Television: Comedy-Variety Talk Series. In 2016, a separate category was added only for sketch series.

== Winners and nominees ==
=== 2010s ===
Year	Program	Writer(s)	Network	Ref.
2015 (68th)	Inside Amy Schumer	Jessi Klein, Hallie Cantor, Kim Caramele, Kyle Dunnigan, Jon Glaser, Kurt Metzger, Christine Nangle, Dan Powell, Tami Sagher and Amy Schumer	Comedy Central	
2015 (68th)	Saturday Night Live	Colin Jost, Rob Klein, James Anderson, Jeremy Beiler, Megan Callahan, Michael Che, Mikey Day, Steve Higgins, Zach Kanin, Chris Kelly, Erik Kenward, Dave McCary, Dennis McNicholas, Lorne Michaels, Claire Mulaney, Mike O'Brien, Josh Patten, Alison Rich, Katie Rich, Tim Robinson, Natasha Rothwell, Nick Rutherford, Meredith Scardino, Sarah Schneider, Pete Schultz, Streeter Seidell, John Solomon and Kent Sublette	NBC	
2015 (68th)	Key & Peele	Colton Dunn, Rebecca Drysdale, Keegan-Michael Key, Phil Augusta Jackson, Jay Martel, Jordan Peele, Ian Roberts, Alex Rubens, Charlie Sanders and Rich Talarico	Comedy Central	
2016 (69th)	Saturday Night Live	Rob Klein, Bryan Tucker (head writers); James Anderson, Fred Armisen, Jeremy Beiler, Chris Belair, Megan Callahan, Michael Che, Mikey Day, Jim Downey, Tina Fey, Fran Gillespie, Sudi Green, Tim Herlihy, Steve Higgins, Colin Jost, Zach Kanin, Chris Kelly, Erik Kenward, Paul Masella, Dave McCary, Dennis McNicholas, Seth Meyers, Lorne Michaels, Josh Patten, Paula Pell, Katie Rich, Tim Robinson, Sarah Schneider, Pete Schultz, Streeter Seidell, Dave Sirus, Emily Spivey, Andrew Steele, Will Stephen, Kent Sublette (writers)	NBC	
2016 (69th)	Documentary Now!	Bill Hader, John Mulaney, Seth Meyers	IFC	
2016 (69th)	Inside Amy Schumer	Kim Caramele, Kyle Dunnigan, Jessi Klein, Michael Lawrence, Kurt Metzger, Christine Nangle, Claudia O'Doherty, Dan Powell, Tami Sagher, Amy Schumer	Comedy Central	
2016 (69th)	Maya & Marty	Mikey Day, Matt Roberts, Bryan Tucker (head writers); Eli Bauman, Jeremy Beiler, Chris Belair, Hallie Cantor, David Feldman, R. J. Fried, Melissa Hunter, Paul Masella, Tim McAuliffe, John Mulaney, Diallo Riddle, Maya Rudolph, Bashir Salahuddin, Marika Sawyer, Streeter Seidell, Martin Short, Emily Spivey, Steve Young (writers)	NBC	
2016 (69th)	Nathan for You	Leo Allen, Nathan Fielder, Adam Locke-Norton, Eric Notarnicola	Comedy Central	
2017 (70th)	Saturday Night Live	Chris Kelly, Sarah Schneider, Bryan Tucker (head writers); James Anderson, Kristen Bartlett, Jeremy Beiler, Neal Brennan, Zack Bornstein, Megan Callahan, Michael Che, Anna Drezen, Fran Gillespie, Sudi Green, Steve Higgins, Colin Jost, Erik Kenward, Rob Klein, Nick Kocher, Michael Koman, Dave McCary, Brian McElhaney, Dennis McNicholas, Drew Michael, Lorne Michaels, Josh Patten, Katie Rich, Pete Schultz, Streeter Seidell, Will Stephen, Kent Sublette, Julio Torres (writers)	NBC	
2017 (70th)	Nathan For You	Leo Allen, Nathan Fielder, Carrie Kemper, Adam Locke-Norton, Eric Notarnicola	Comedy Central	
2017 (70th)	The President Show	Emily Altman, Anthony Atamanuik, Emmy Blotnick, Neil Casey, Mike Drucker, Noah Garfinkel, John Gemberling, Peter Grosz, Mitra Jouhari, John Knefel, Alison Leiby, Christine Nangle, John Reynolds, Jason Ross, Rae Sanni, Evan Waite	Comedy Central	
2017 (70th)	Weekend Update Summer Edition	Megan Callahan, Michael Che, Mikey Day, Steve Higgins, Colin Jost, Dennis McNicholas, Josh Patten, Katie Rich, Pete Schultz, Streeter Seidell, Kent Sublette, Bryan Tucker	NBC	
2017 (70th)	Portlandia	Fred Armisen, Carrie Brownstein, Karen Kilgariff, Jonathan Krisel, Graham Wagner	IFC	
2018 (71st)	Nathan For You	Leo Allen, Nathan Fielder, Carrie Kemper, Adam Locke-Norton, Eric Notarnicola	Comedy Central	
2018 (71st)	At Home with Amy Sedaris	Cindy Caponera, Paul Dinello, Jodi Lennon, Meredith Scardino, Amy Sedaris	truTV	
2018 (71st)	I Love You, America	Head Writer: Dave Ferguson; Writers: Glenn Boozan, Leann Bowen, Raj Desai, Kyle Dunnigan, John Haskell, Tim Kalpakis, Opeyemi Olagbaju, Gavin Purcell, Diona Reasonover, Jocelyn Richard, Christopher J. Romano, Sarah Silverman, Beth Stelling, Dan Sterling, Nick Wiger	Hulu	
2018 (71st)	Portlandia	Fred Armisen, Carrie Brownstein, Karen Kilgariff, Jonathan Krisel, Karey Dorentto, Megan Neuringer, Phoebe Robinson, Graham Wagner	IFC	
2018 (71st)	Saturday Night Live	Michael Che, Colin Jost, Kent Sublette, Bryan Tucker (head writers); Fran Gillespie, Sudi Green, Streeter Seidell (supervising writers); James Anderson, Kristen Bartlett, Megan Callahan, Steve Castillo, Andrew Dismukes, Anna Drezen, Claire Friedman, Alison Gates, Steve Higgins, Sam Jay, Erik Kenward, Rob Klein, Nick Kocher, Michael Koman, Alan Linic, Eli Coyote Mandal, Erik Marino, Dave McCary, Brian McElhaney, Dennis McNicholas, Lorne Michaels, Nimesh Patel, Josh Patten, Katie Rich, Simon Rich, Gary Richardson, Marika Sawyer, Pete Schultz, Mitch Silpa, Will Stephen, Julio Torres, Bowen Yang (writers)	NBC	
2019 (72nd)	I Think You Should Leave with Tim Robinson	Jeremy Beiler, Zach Kanin, Tim Robinson, and John Solomon	Netflix	
2019 (72nd)	At Home with Amy Sedaris	Cole Escola, Amy Sedaris, and Allison Silverman	truTV	
2019 (72nd)	Saturday Night Live	Michael Che, Colin Jost, Kent Sublette (head writers); Anna Drezen, Fran Gillespie, Sudi Green, Streeter Seidell (supervising writers); Bryan Tucker (senior writer); Pete Schultz (Weekend Update head writer); James Anderson, Neal Brennan, Andrew Briedis, Megan Callahan, Steve Castillo, Emma Clark, Andrew Dismukes, Alison Gates, Tim Herlihy, Steve Higgins, Sam Jay, Erik Kenward, Steve Koren, Rob Klein, Michael Koman, Dan Licata, Alan Linic, Eli Coyote Mandal, Dave McCary, Dennis McNicholas, Lorne Michaels, John Mulaney, Jasmin Pierce, Josh Patten, Katie Rich, Simon Rich, Gary Richardson, Marika Sawyer, Robert Smigel, Mark Steinbach, Will Stephen, Julio Torres, and Bowen Yang (writers)	NBC	

=== 2020s ===
Year	Program	Writer(s)	Network	Ref.
2020 (73rd)	At Home with Amy Sedaris	Jeremy Beiler, Cole Escola, Peter Grosz, Amy Sedaris	truTV	
2020 (73rd)	How To with John Wilson	Michael Koman, John Wilson	HBO	
2020 (73rd)	The Amber Ruffin Show	Jenny Hagel (head writer); Demi Adejuyigbe, Shantira Jackson, Dewayne Perkins, Amber Ruffin (writers); John Lutz (additional material)	Peacock	
2021 (74th)	I Think You Should Leave with Tim Robinson	Zach Kanin, Tim Robinson, John Solomon	Netflix	
2021 (74th)	How To with John Wilson	Alice Gregory, Michael Koman, Conner O'Malley, Susan Orlean, John Wilson	HBO	
2021 (74th)	PAUSE with Sam Jay	Emmy Blotnick, Ryan Donahue, Zack Fox, Megan Gailey, Robin M. Henry, Sam Jay, Langston Kerman, Jak Knight	HBO	
2021 (74th)	Saturday Night Live	Michael Che, Anna Drezen, Colin Jost, Kent Sublette, Bryan Tucker, Pete Schultz (head writers); Megan Callahan-Shah, Dennis McNicholas, Josh Patten, Mark Steinbach (Weekend Update writers); Alison Gates, Fran Gillespie, Sudi Green, Streeter Seidell (supervising writers); James Anderson, Dan Bulla, Steven Castillo, Mike DiCenzo, Billy Domineau, Alex English, John Higgins, Steve Higgins, Martin Herlihy, Vannessa Jackson, Sam Jay, Erik Kenward, Tesha Kondrat, Dan Licata, Lorne Michaels, Ben Marshall, Jake Nordwind, Jasmine Pierce, Gary Richardson, Ben Silva, Emily Spivey, Will Stephen, Celeste Yim (writers)	NBC	
2021 (74th)	That Damn Michael Che	Michael Che, Gary Richardson, Rosebud Baker, Reggie Conquest, Godfrey Danchimah Jr., Calise Hawkins, Kevin Iso, Sam Jay, Matt Richards, Wil Sylvince	HBO Max	
2022 (75th)	Inside Amy Schumer	Georgie Aldaco, Rosebud Baker, Jeremy Beiler, Cazzie David, Tova Diker, Derek Gaines, Jon Glaser, Jaye McBride, Tim Meadows, Christine Nangle, Daniel Powell, Tami Sagher, Yamaneika Saunders, Amy Schumer, Sascha Seinfeld, Joe Strazzullo, Sydnee Washington, and Ron Weiner	Paramount+	
2022 (75th)	PAUSE with Sam Jay	Emmy Blotnick, Ryan Donahue, Megan Gailey, Sam Jay, Joyelle Johnson, Langston Kerman, Jak Knight (posthumous nomination), Teresa Lo, Lucy Ortiz, and Lorena Russi	HBO/HBO Max	
2022 (75th)	Saturday Night Live	Michael Che, Alison Gates, Colin Jost, Streeter Seidell, Kent Sublette (head writers); Bryan Tucker (senior writer); James Anderson, Rosebud Baker, Dan Bulla, Mike DiCenzo, Billy Domineau, James Downey, Alex English, Jimmy Fowlie, Martin Herlihy, John Higgins, Steve Higgins, Vannessa Jackson, Erik Kenward, Tesha Kondrat, Ben Marshall, Lorne Michaels, Jake Nordwind, Clare O'Kane, Ceara O'Sullivan, Simon Rich, Ben Silva, John Solomon, Will Stephen, Nicole Sun, Auguste White, Celeste Yim (writers); Pete Schultz (Weekend Update head writer); Megan Callahan-Shah, Dennis McNicholas, Josh Patten, KC Shornima, and Mark Steinbach (Weekend Update writers)	NBC	

== Programs with multiple awards ==
2 awards

- Inside Amy Schumer (Comedy Central)
- Saturday Night Live (NBC)
- I Think You Should Leave with Tim Robinson (Netflix)

== Programs with multiple nominations ==
6 nominations

- Saturday Night Live (NBC)

3 nominations

- At Home with Amy Sedaris (truTV)
- Inside Amy Schumer (Comedy Central)
- Nathan for You (Comedy Central)

2 nominations

- Portlandia (IFC)
- I Think You Should Leave with Tim Robinson (Netflix)
- How To with John Wilson (HBO)

== See also ==
- Primetime Emmy Award for Outstanding Writing for a Variety Series
