= Have I Got News for You (American game show) =

American television panel show

- Genre: Comedy panel game; Political satire
- Created by: Jimmy Mulville
- Presented by: Roy Wood Jr.
- Starring: Amber Ruffin; Michael Ian Black
- Theme music composer: original BBC music by Big George, theme reinterpreted by Doug Stoley
- Country of origin: United States
- Original language: English
- No. of seasons: 5
- No. of episodes: 41

Production
- Production location: CBS Broadcast Center
- Running time: 44 minutes
- Production company: Hat Trick Productions

Original release
- Network: CNN
- Release: September 14, 2024 – present

Have I Got News for You (HIGNFY) is an American television panel show based on the British series of the same name. The show premiered on September 14, 2024, on CNN and aired around the time of the 2024 United States elections. Two pairs captained by Amber Ruffin and Michael Ian Black answer news-based trivia questions on current events happening the week prior to an episode's broadcast. Unlike the British original, which has used guest hosts since 2002, the program booked a permanent host in Roy Wood Jr. The show received mixed reception but improved the network's ratings for its slot and was recommissioned for a second season, which began airing on February 15, 2025. Episodes stream shortly after broadcast on the CNN app and next day on HBO Max.

== Gameplay ==
Title Card used since 2024

The rounds are similar to those of the British version, with "Missing Words" and "Odd One Out" featuring in both. Regular rounds included the following:

- "What's the Story?": Wood shows the teams clip packages referencing a major news story from the last week and they have to tell him what they refer to.
- "Offend-O-Meter": Teams receive pictures from an index and have to guess who they are, what they did, and whom they offended.
- "Missing Words": Wood gives the teams headlines with keywords excised and they have to fill in the blanks.
- "Odd One Out": Teams have to guess which picture out of four does not belong.
- "Lie-Curious": Teams are given three biographical statements and are asked which is true.
- "Meet in the Middle": Panellists decide which people share a common characteristic.
- "Common Ground": Two famous people are provided. Panellists decide which of the three biographical statements apply to both of them, then which of the two remaining facts applies to whom individually.
- "Caption Contest": Wood gives the teams pictures and asks them to caption them.
- "Which is Higher?": Teams try to figure out which one of two items costs higher.
- "Who's That Baby?": Teams have to guess a famous person by their baby picture and three biographical clues.

== Background ==
The British version of Have I Got News for You premiered in 1990 with Angus Deayton as presenter and Ian Hislop and Paul Merton as team captains, and was commissioned by a BBC department that included Mark Thompson. The series is produced by Hat Trick Productions, an outfit helmed by Jimmy Mulville, and moved from BBC Two to BBC One in 2000 after Thompson became its director of television. Episodes are half an hour long. The program has a reputation for acerbity, twice replacing guests who cancelled with inanimate objects, and was once sued for describing a sitting Member of Parliament as a "conniving little shit". Deayton resigned in 2002 amid claims that he had taken cocaine and slept with prostitutes, and the show now uses guest hosts.

== History ==
In 2005, Bravo expressed interest in airing its own version, with Sam Seder piloting versions for NBC and TBS in 2009 and 2012. The team captains for the NBC version were Michael Ian Black and Greg Giraldo, while TBS hired Black and Sherrod Small as captains. Mulville has stated these networks had declined the show as they wanted it to be more pop-culture and celebrity-based and that one US talent agent had told him the show was "too British" for an American audience. In early 2024, he approached Thompson, who the previous autumn had become the director general of CNN, about making a version of the show for his network. He was receptive to the idea and announced the series while speaking at the Warner Bros. Discovery TV Upfronts week presentation on May 15, 2024, promising "a smart, silly, opinionated, and edgy take on the news of the week". The show was initially commissioned for ten episodes.

Current series panellists and host

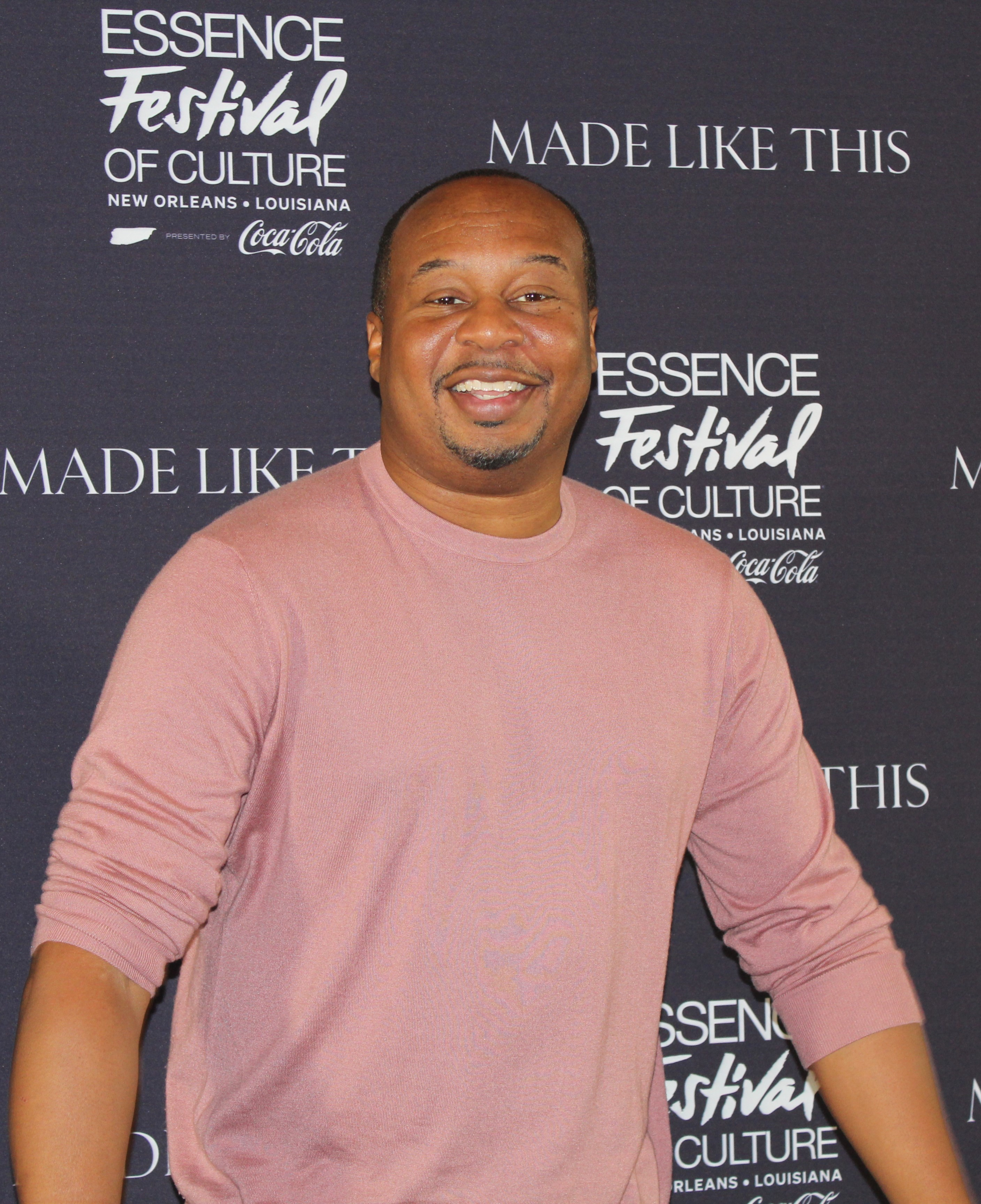
Roy Wood Jr.

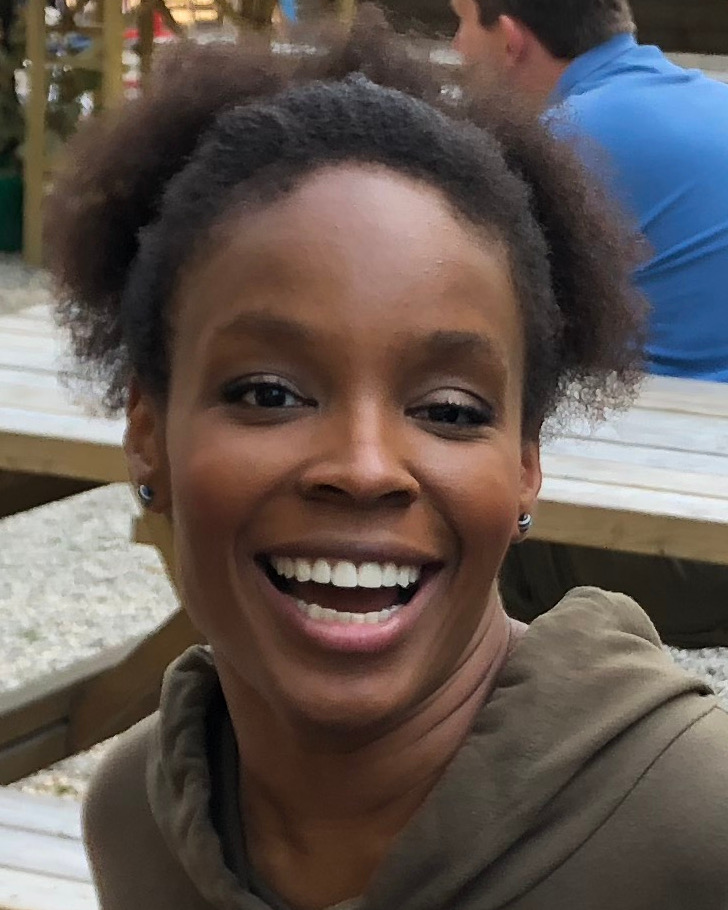
Amber Ruffin

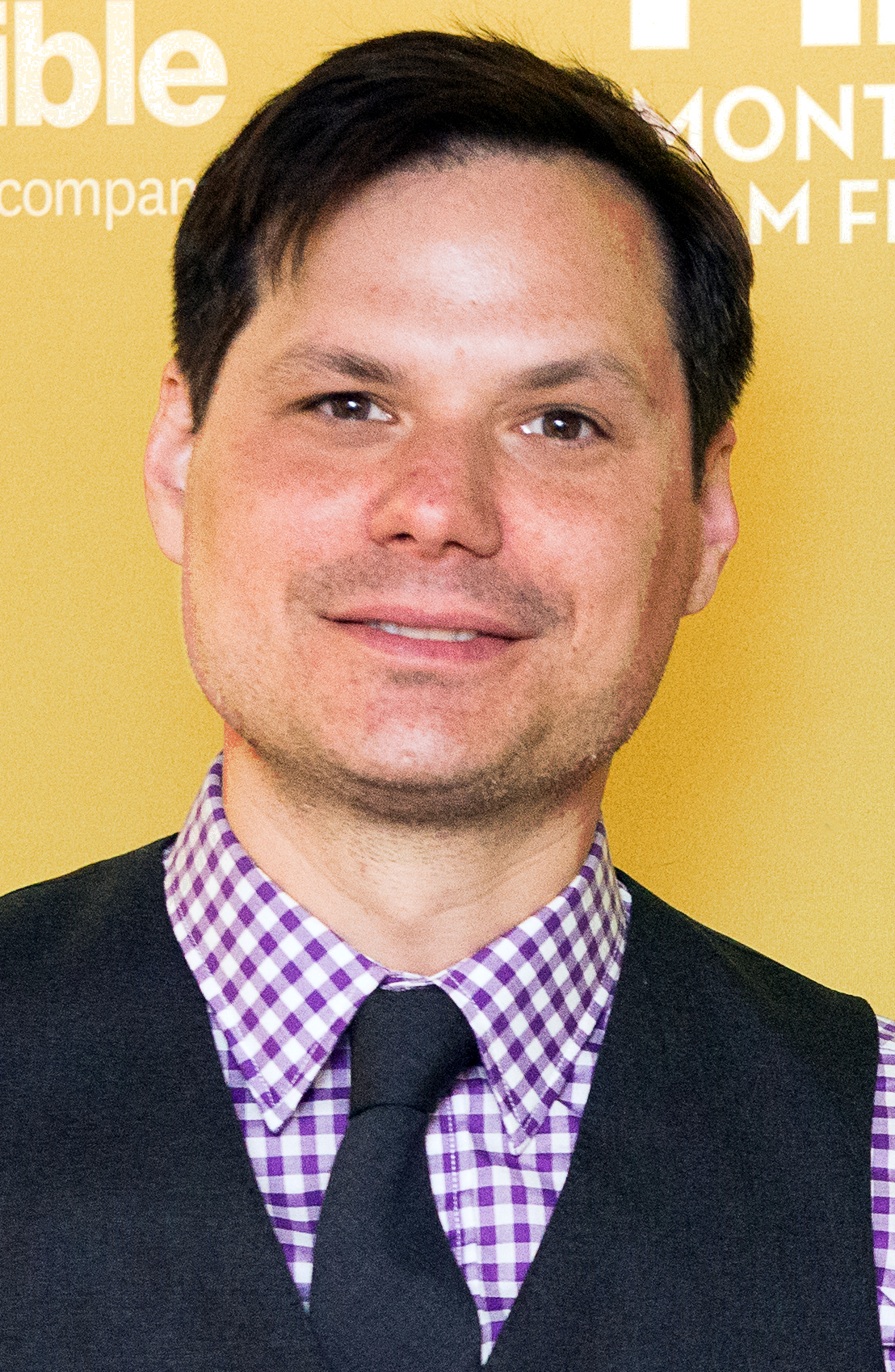
Michael Ian Black

In August 2024, the Alabama-raised comedian Roy Wood Jr. was announced as the show's sole host; he had previously been a correspondent for The Daily Show between 2015 and 2023 and had been involved in a prior pilot for the show. Later that month, it was announced that Michael Ian Black would appear as team captain opposite Amber Ruffin, who had hosted several series of The Amber Ruffin Show and been a long-time writer for Late Night with Seth Meyers. She had got her job after auditioning opposite multiple other late-night show presenters, contributors and news podcasters. The trio had not worked together before the show but did film a test episode beforehand. Episodes were recorded on Fridays and broadcast on Saturdays and were an hour long. The series used a bass-heavy remix of the original show's theme tune and followed next-day repeats of HBO's Real Time with Bill Maher, which CNN had begun carrying in March 2024 and which had become their highest-rating show. (Note: For its slot, see.; For everything else, see.)

The series premiered on September 14, 2024, with Ruffin and Black accompanied for that episode by libertarian writer Matt Welch and comedian and A Black Lady Sketch Show creator Robin Thede. By the following afternoon, extensive outtakes from the show had circulated on the internet. (Note: For "A Black Lady Sketch Show" creator, see.; For everything else, see.) On September 18, 2024, the BBC announced that they had scheduled the first episode for broadcast on BBC Two later that day and would air the rest of the series. Subsequent episodes featured a pre-show disclaimer, "This is CNN. But also kinda NOT CNN."; its next eight episodes featured among others Andy Richter, Mark McKinnon, Ana Navarro, Larry Wilmore, Adam Kinzinger, Anthony Scaramucci, Bomani Jones, and Tim Burchett, while Kara Swisher also appeared that series. Samantha Bee was originally scheduled to appear on the ninth episode, however dropped out as she did not wish to appear with Burchett.

By the third episode, Wood had promoted the show on Sherri and asserted that he had received messages from British people begging him not to perform poorly, prompting him to promise to treat the show "better than they treated Meghan Markle". By that episode, a running joke had developed involving Ruffin saying "Roy" repeatedly in response to his ribaldry. Wood later presented an episode of the British version scheduled for November 8, the week of the US election, on the grounds that the American version had taken a week off as they thought that the result would not be declared quickly enough. He promoted this episode with an appearance on The One Show. During his episode, he struggled with the pronunciation of Worcestershire and the villages Flyford Flavell and Upton Snodsbury; the mention of the latter two prompted the villages' MP Nigel Huddleston to praise the program. He presented two further episodes, one each in 2025 and 2026.

Series two, broadcast in early 2025, included as panellists Richter, Mike Lawler, Tim Ryan, George Conway, Alyssa Farah Griffin, and Representatives Jasmine Crockett, and Ro Khanna. A weekly companion podcast to the show, Have I Got News For Your Ears, hosted by Black, was launched. Further series were broadcast in late 2025 and early 2026; several episodes of the latter were broadcast only on CNNgo due to coverage of the 2026 Iran war and one episode featured British comedian Nish Kumar.

== Episodes ==
=== Series overview ===
Season	Episodes	Originally released	
Season	Episodes	First released	Last released
1	10	September 14, 2024	November 23, 2024
2	10	February 15, 2025	April 19, 2025
3	10	September 6, 2025	November 8, 2025
4	10	January 24, 2026	March 28, 2026
5	10	September 12, 2026	November 21, 2026

=== Season 1 (2024) ===
No. overall	No. in season	Amber's team	Michael's team	Original release date
1	1	Matt Welch	Robin Thede	September 14, 2024
2	2	Charlie Dent	Rosebud Baker	September 21, 2024
3	3	Negin Farsad	Mark McKinnon	September 28, 2024
4	4	Andy Richter	Ana Navarro	October 5, 2024
5	5	John Hodgman	Joanna Coles	October 12, 2024
6	6	Sam Seder	Alex Edelman	October 19, 2024
7	7	Adam Kinzinger	Larry Wilmore	October 26, 2024
8	8	Anthony Scaramucci	Sam Jay	November 2, 2024
9	9	Bomani Jones (Note: Samantha Bee was announced as a guest but was absent from the broadcast. Bee later explained her cancellation was due to not wanting to appear together with Tim Burchett.)	Tim Burchett	November 16, 2024
10	10	Kara Swisher	Jenny Hagel (Note: Dave Foley was booked for this episode but had to drop out due to illness and posted just before broadcast that he was suffering from pneumonia.)	November 23, 2024

=== Season 2 (2025) ===
No. overall	No. in season	Amber's team	Michael's team	Original release date
11	1	George Conway	Andy Richter	February 15, 2025
12	2	Joyelle Nicole Johnson	Mike Lawler	February 22, 2025
13	3	Dave Foley	Jasmine Crockett	March 1, 2025
14	4	Alex Edelman	Laurie Kilmartin	March 8, 2025
15	5	Bomani Jones	Nimesh Patel	March 15, 2025
16	6	Tim Ryan	Jenny Hagel	March 22, 2025
17	7	Sam Seder	Sam Jay	March 29, 2025
18	8	Ro Khanna	Karen Chee	April 5, 2025
19	9	Kristen Soltis Anderson	Eugene Mirman	April 12, 2025
20	10	George Wallace	Alyssa Farah Griffin	April 19, 2025

=== Season 3 (2025) ===
No. overall	No. in season	Amber's team	Michael's team	Original release date
21	1	Dave Foley	Jasmine Crockett	September 6, 2025
22	2	David Gelles (Note: E. Jean Carroll was originally announced as a guest.)	Mae Martin	September 13, 2025
23	3	Adam Kinzinger	Negin Farsad	September 21, 2025 (Note: Program had a one-off re-schedule from a Saturday evening to a Sunday evening.)
24	4	Lewis Black	Joy Reid	September 27, 2025
25	5	John Hodgman	Akilah Hughes	October 4, 2025
26	6	Kara Swisher	Zainab Johnson	October 11, 2025
27	7	Gianmarco Soresi	Julia Ioffe	October 18, 2025
28	8	Paula Poundstone	Dana Nessel	October 25, 2025
29	9	Max Chafkin	Jennifer Welch	November 1, 2025
30	10	Bomani Jones (Note: Adam Schiff was originally announced as a guest.)	Jenny Hagel	November 8, 2025

=== Season 4 (2026) ===
No. overall	No. in season	Amber's team	Michael's team	Original release date
31	1	Andy Richter	Janice Min	January 24, 2026 (Note: Aired on the CNN app due to news coverage.)
32	2	Tara Setmayer	Nimesh Patel	January 31, 2026
33	3	Adam Schiff	Hasan Minhaj	February 7, 2026
34	4	Aaron Parnas	Scott Thompson	February 14, 2026
35	5	Larry Wilmore	Jordan Carlos	February 21, 2026
36	6	Julia Ioffe	Bomani Jones	February 28, 2026 (Note: Aired on the CNN app due to news coverage.)
37	7	Gianmarco Soresi	Jenny Hagel	March 7, 2026 (Note: Aired on the CNN app due to news coverage.)
38	8	Moshe Kasher	Ophira Eisenberg	March 14, 2026 (Note: Aired on the CNN app due to news coverage.)
39	9	Hari Kondabolu	Ari Shapiro	March 21, 2026
40	10	Kara Swisher	Nish Kumar	March 28, 2026

=== Season 5 (2026) ===
No. overall	No. in season	Amber's team	Michael's team	Original release date
41	1	Jon Lovett	Julia Ioffe	September 12, 2026
42	2	Abigail Spanberger	Kara Swisher	September 19, 2026
43	3	Dave Foley	Ashley Allison	October 3, 2026
44	4	Larry Wilmore	Rosebud Baker	October 10, 2026
45	5	Adam Mockler	Josh Gondelman	October 17, 2026
45	6	David Pakman	Jenny Hagel	October 24, 2026
45	7	David Alan Grier	Sam Jay	October 31, 2026
48	8	Gianmarco Soresi	Moshe Kasher	November 7, 2026
49	9	John Hodgeman	Michelle Wolf	November 14, 2026
50	10	Adam Kinzinger	Aaron Parnas	November 21, 2026

== Reception ==
The show's timing, in the run-up to the 2024 United States elections and during a period where any accusations of bias either way could impact the channel's centrist reputation, led the University of Connecticut professor of communication David D'Alessio to ask a The New York Times interviewer if "someone at CNN" had "lost their mind". Ed Power of The Daily Telegraph wondered "how CNN's British-born boss Mark Thompson was talked by Hat Trick co-founder Jimmy Mulville into importing the format" and considered the program less barbed than the original, though he also described the show as "cheerfully competent" and "nowhere near the embarrassment it might have been". The latter two quotes featured on CNN's announcement of its series two commission. Joel Keller of Decider.com complimented the comedy of Wood, Ruffin, and Black, but felt the show was too long.

Dylan Fugel of Paste felt that the show lacked the "meanness" of the original and wrote that it appeared "to sit uncomfortably between genres, a show that wants the 'we're all goofing around' lightness of After Midnight or Whose Line Is It Anyway? while dealing with the 'this world is going to hell' topics of competitors like The Daily Show". He also opined that Welch made the funniest joke of the night and that the show was excessively pacey, which he blamed on the competitors, especially Black, getting answers right too often. The opening episode was watched by 737,000 people, which was more than most CNN programs got in that slot but slightly less than Real Time. HIGNFY was beaten in the ratings by One Nation with Brian Kilmeade, which aired opposite on Fox News, and the first half of the two-hour special MSNBC Live: Democracy 2024, which aired on NBC.

Reviewing the show three episodes in, Omar Gallega of Book and Film Globe felt that Wood's "laconic" delivery was "a welcome change from the fast-bordering-on-hysterical pace of, say, John Oliver on Last Week Tonight" and that Ruffin and Black were "absolute comedic dynamite". He also felt that the show benefitted from airing weekly but suffered from being an hour long and for its lack of scoring, and wrote that many of its non-comedian panelists "too often" seemed "out of their element". Reviewing episode six, Weaver's Week of UKGameshows.com opined that the show included "a round or two they could comfortably replace" and "a round or two they could re-introduce to the BBC show", while Callum Jones of The Guardian reviewed the show seven episodes in and wrote that the show appeared "less wedded to actual news" and that viewers "after biting political punchlines [...] may be disappointed".
