= 77th Writers Guild of America Awards =

77th WGA Awards
- Date: February 15, 2025
- Organized by: Writers Guild of America, East and the Writers Guild of America West

The 77th Writers Guild of America Awards was held on February 15, 2025, to honor the best writing in film, television and radio of 2024. The nominations were announced on January 15, 2025. The Writers Guild originally scheduled to announce the nominations on January 9, but they postponed them twice due to the series of wildfires affecting Southern California.

== Winners and nominees ==
Winners are listed first in boldface.

=== Film ===
| **Best Original Screenplay**: **Anora – Sean Baker**; Challengers – Justin Kuritzkes; Civil War – Alex Garland; My Old Ass – Megan Park; A Real Pain – Jesse Eisenberg | **Best Adapted Screenplay**: **Nickel Boys – RaMell Ross and Joslyn Barnes; based on the book The Nickel Boys by Colson Whitehead**; A Complete Unknown – James Mangold and Jay Cocks; based on the book Dylan Goes Electric! by Elijah Wald; Dune: Part Two – Denis Villeneuve and Jon Spaihts; based on the novel Dune by Frank Herbert; Hit Man – Richard Linklater and Glen Powell; based on the Texas Monthly article by Skip Hollandsworth; Wicked – Winnie Holzman and Dana Fox; based on the musical stage play with music and lyrics by Stephen Schwartz and book by Winnie Holzman; from the novel by Gregory Maguire |
**Best Documentary Screenplay**: **Jim Henson: Idea Man – Mark Monroe**; Kiss the Future – screenplay by Bill S. Carter, story by Bill S. Carter and Nenad Cicin-Sain; Martha – R. J. Cutler; War Game – Tony Gerber and Jesse Moss

=== Television ===
| **Drama Series**: **Shōgun (FX/Hulu) – Shannon Goss, Maegan Houang, Rachel Kondo, Matt Lambert, Justin Marks, Caillin Puente, Nigel Williams, Emily Yoshida**; The Boys (Prime Video) – Geoff Aull, Jessica Chou, Paul Grellong, Eric Kripke, Ellie Monahan, Judalina Neira, David Reed, Anslem Richardson; The Diplomat (Netflix) – Peter Ackerman, Eli Attie, Debora Cahn, Anna Hagen, Julianna Dudley Meagher, Peter Noah; Fallout (Prime Video) – Jake Bender, Karey Dornetto, Zach Dunn, Kieran Fitzgerald, Chaz Hawkins, Lisa Joy, Carson Mell, Jonathan Nolan, Geneva Robertson-Dworet, Gursimran Sandhu, Graham Wagner; Mr. and Mrs. Smith (Prime Video) – Carla Ching, Adamma Ebo, Adanne Ebo, Donald Glover, Stephen Glover, Schuyler Pappas, Francesca Sloane, Yvonne Hana Yi | **Comedy Series**: **Hacks (HBO Max) – Genevieve Aniello, Lucia Aniello, Guy Branum, Jessica Chaffin, Paul W. Downs, Jess Dweck, Ariel Karlin, Andrew Law, Carol Leifer, Carolyn Lipka, Joe Mande, Aisha Muharrar, Pat Regan, Samantha Riley, Jen Statsky**; Abbott Elementary (ABC) – Quinta Brunson, Ava Coleman, Riley Dufurrena, Justin Halpern, Joya McCrory, Chad Morton, Morgan Murphy, Brittani Nichols, Rebekka Pesqueira, Kate Peterman, Brian Rubenstein, Patrick Schumacker, Justin Tan, Jordan Temple, Garrett Werner; The Bear (FX/Hulu) – Karen Joseph Adcock, Joanna Calo, Rene Gube, Will Guidara, Matty Matheson, Alex Russell, Catherine Schetina, Christopher Storer, Courtney Storer; Curb Your Enthusiasm (HBO) – Larry David, Jon Hayman, Justin Hurwitz, Carol Leifer, Stephen Leff, Jeff Schaffer, Nathaniel Stein; What We Do in the Shadows (FX/Hulu) – Jake Bender, Max Brockman, Zach Dunn, Shana Gohd, Amelia Haller, Sam Johnson, Jeremy Levick, Chris Marcil, William Meny, Sarah Naftalis, Marika Sawyer, Paul Simms, Rajat Suresh, Lauren Wells |
| **New Series**: **Shōgun (FX/Hulu) – Shannon Goss, Maegan Houang, Rachel Kondo, Matt Lambert, Justin Marks, Caillin Puente, Nigel Williams, Emily Yoshida**; English Teacher (FX/Hulu) – Brian Jordan Alvarez, Wally Baram, Jake Bender, Emmy Blotnick, Zach Dunn, Dave King, Stephanie Koenig, Jonathan Krisel, Paul Simms, Samantha Shier; Fallout (Prime Video) – Jake Bender, Karey Dornetto, Zach Dunn, Kieran Fitzgerald, Chaz Hawkins, Lisa Joy, Carson Mell, Jonathan Nolan, Geneva Robertson-Dworet, Gursimran Sandhu, Graham Wagner; Mr. and Mrs. Smith (Prime Video) – Carla Ching, Adamma Ebo, Adanne Ebo, Donald Glover, Stephen Glover, Schuyler Pappas, Francesca Sloane, and Yvonne Hana Yi; Nobody Wants This (Netflix) – Barbie Adler, Jane Becker, Jack Burditt, Vali Chandrasekaran, Craig DiGregorio, Erin Foster, Lindsay Golder, Steven Levitan, Pat Regan, Niki Schwartz-Wright, Neel Shah, Noelle Valdivia, Ron Weiner, Ryann Werner | **Limited Series**: **The Penguin (HBO) – Vladimir Cvetko, Breannah Gibson, Erika L. Johnson, Lauren LeFranc, Corina Maritescu, Megan Martin, John McCutcheon, Shaye Ogbonna, Nick Towne, Noelle Valdivia, Kira Snyder**; Presumed Innocent (Apple TV+) – Miki Johnson, David E. Kelley, and Sharr White; Ripley (Netflix) – Steven Zaillian; Say Nothing (FX/Hulu) – Clare Barron, Joe Murtagh, Kirsten Sheridan, Joshua Zetumer; True Detective: Night Country (HBO) – Katrina Albright, Alan Page Arriaga, Namsi Khan, Issa López, Chris Mundy, Wenonah Wilms |
| **TV & New Media Motion Pictures**: **The Great Lillian Hall (HBO) – Elisabeth Seldes Annacone**; Prom Dates (Hulu) – D.J. Mausner; Rebel Ridge (Netflix) – Jeremy Saulnier; Terry McMillan Presents: Forever (Lifetime) – Bart Baker | **Animation**: **"Saving Favorite Drive-In" – Bob's Burgers (Fox) – Katie Crown**; "Bottle Episode" – The Simpsons (Fox) – Rob LaZebnik and Johnny LaZebnik; "Cremains of the Day" – The Simpsons (Fox) – John Frink; "Night of the Living Wage" – The Simpsons (Fox) – Cesar Mazariegos; "The Tina Table: The Tables have Tina-ed" – Bob's Burgers (Fox) – Greg Thompson; "Winter is Born" – Blood of Zeus (Netflix) – Charles Parlapanides and Vlas Parlapanides |
| **Episodic Drama**: **"Anjin" – Shōgun (FX/Hulu) – Rachel Kondo and Justin Marks**; "The Beginning" – Fallout (Prime Video) – Gursimran Sandhu; "Fear of the End" – Evil (Paramount+) – Rockne S. O'Bannon and Nialla LeBouef; "First Date" – Mr. and Mrs. Smith (Prime Video) – Francesca Sloane and Donald Glover; "Olivia" – Sugar (Apple TV+) – Mark Protosevich; "Pilot" – Elsbeth (CBS) – Robert King and Michelle King | **Episodic Comedy**: **"Bulletproof" – Hacks (HBO Max) – Lucia Aniello, Paul W. Downs and Jen Statsky**; "AGG" – Somebody Somewhere (HBO) – Hannah Bos, Paul Thureen and Bridget Everett; "Napkins" – The Bear (FX/Hulu) – Catherine Schetina; "Linda" – English Teacher (FX/Hulu) – Jake Bender and Zach Dunn; "Once Upon a Time in the West" – Only Murders in the Building (Hulu) – John Hoffman and Joshua Allen Griffith; "Petiole" – The Sticky (Prime Video) – Brian Donovan and Ed Herro |
| **Comedy/Variety – Talk or Sketch Series**: **Last Week Tonight with John Oliver (HBO) – Senior Writers: Daniel O'Brien, Owen Parsons, Charlie Redd, Joanna Rothkopf, Seena Vali; Writers: Johnathan Appel, Ali Barthwell, Tim Carvell, Liz Hynes, Ryan Ken, Mark Kramer, Sofia Manfredi, John Oliver, Taylor Kay Phillips, Chrissy Shackelford**; The Daily Show (Comedy Central) – Head Writer: Dan Amira; Senior Writers: Lauren Sarver Means, Daniel Radosh; Writers: David Angelo, Nicole Conlan, Devin Delliquanti, Zach DiLanzo, Jen Flanz, Jason Gilbert, Dina Hashem, Scott Hercman, Josh Johnson, David Kibuuka, Matt Koff, Joe Opio, Randall Otis, Zhubin Parang, Kat Radley, Lanee’ Sanders, Scott Sherman, Jon Stewart, Ashton Womack, Sophie Zucker; John Mulaney Presents: Everybody's in LA (Netflix) – Writers: Anna Drezen, David Ferguson, Fran Gillespie, Langston Kerman, Jeremy Levick, John Mulaney, Alex Scordelis, Rajat Suresh; The Kelly Clarkson Show (Syndicated) – Head Writer: Jordan Watland; Writers: Kevin Hurley, Nik Robinson; The Late Show with Stephen Colbert (CBS) – Head Writers: Ariel Dumas, Jay Katsir; Writers: Delmonte Bent, Michael Brumm, Aaron Cohen, Stephen T. Colbert, Paul Dinello, Glenn Eichler, Gabe Gronli, Barry Julien, Michael Cruz Kayne, Eliana Kwartler, Matt Lappin, Caroline Lazar, Pratima Mani, Felipe Torres Medina, Opus Moreschi, Carley Moseley, Asher Perlman, Michael Pielocik, Tom Purcell, Kate Sidley, Brian Stack, John Thibodeaux, Steve Waltien; Saturday Night Live (NBC) – Head Writers: Alison Gates, Streeter Seidell, Kent Sublette; Writers: Rosebud Baker, Dan Bulla, Megan Callahan-Shah, Steven Castillo, Michael Che, Mike DiCenzo, Alex English, Jimmy Fowlie, Martin Herlihy, John Higgins, Steve Higgins, Vannessa Jackson, Colin Jost, Erik Kenward, Ben Marshall, Dennis McNicholas, Lorne Michaels, Jake Nordwind, Ceara O’Sullivan, Josh Patten, Gary Richardson, Pete Schultz, KC Shornima, Asha Ward, Auguste White, Celeste Yim | **Comedy/Variety – Specials**: **Nikki Glaser: Someday You'll Die (HBO) – Nikki Glaser**; The 77th Annual Tony Awards (CBS) – Dave Boone; A Closer Look with Seth Meyers: Primetime Live Election Special (NBC) – Head Writer: Alex Baze; Writing Supervision: Mike Scollins; Closer Look Writing Supervision: Sal Gentile; Writers: Alex Baze, Bryan Donaldson, Sal Gentile, Matt Goldich, Allison Hord, Mike Scollins, Seth Meyers, Mike Shoemaker; Ramy Youssef: More Feelings (HBO) – Ramy Youssef |
| **Quiz and Audience Participation**: **Pop Culture Jeopardy! (Prime Video) – Writers: Marcus Brown, Buzzy Cohen, Michael Davies, Chip Dornell, John Duarte, Mark Gaberman, Debbie Griffin, Michele Loud, Traci Mack, Amy Ozols, Louis Virtel, Billy Wisse**; Jeopardy! (ABC) – Writers: Marcus Brown, Michael Davies, John Duarte, Mark Gaberman, Debbie Griffin, Michele Loud, Robert McClenaghan, Jim Rhine, Steve Tamerius, Billy Wisse | **Daytime Drama**: **The Young and the Restless (CBS/Paramount+) – Head Writer: Amanda L. Beall; Writers: Susan Banks, Jeff Beldner, Marin Gazzaniga, Lindsay Harrison, Marla Kanelos, Rebecca McCarty, Madeleine Phillips, Dave Ryan**; Days of Our Lives (Peacock) – Head Writer: Ron Carlivati; Writers: Sonja Alarr, Kirk Doering, Christopher Dunn, Jamey Giddens, David Kreizman, Henry Newman, Ryan Quan, Dave Ryan, Katherine D. Schock; General Hospital (ABC) – Head Writers: Elizabeth Korte, Chris Van Etten; Writers: Nigel Campbell, Ashley Cook, Emily Culliton, Suzanne Flynn, Charlotte Gibson, Lucky Gold, Kate Hall, Catherine LePard, Patrick Mulcahey, Dan O’Connor, Shannon Peace, Stacey Pulwer, Anne Schoettle, Scott Sickles, Micah Steinberg |
**Short Form New Media**: **Die Hart 3: Hart to Kill (Roku) – Tripper Clancy**; Tiny Time Travel (PBS Kids) – Annabeth Bondor-Stone, Cynthia Furey, Tim McKeon, Nikki Palumbo, Connor White, Moujan Zolfaghari

==== Children ====
**Children's Episodic, Long Form and Specials**
- **"Welcome to Spiderwick" – The Spiderwick Chronicles (Roku) – Aron Eli Coleite**
  - "A God Buys Us Cheeseburgers" – Percy Jackson and the Olympians (Disney+) – Rick Riordan and Jonathan E. Steinberg
  - "I'm Pogey" – Fraggle Rock: Back to the Rock (Apple TV+) – Charley Feldman
  - Out of My Mind (Disney+) – Daniel Stiepleman
  - "The Sign Language ABC's" – Sesame Street (HBO) – Jessica Carleton

==== Documentary ====
**Documentary Script**
- **"Part One: Inferno to Paradise" – Dante (PBS) – Ric Burns and Riccardo Bruscagli**
  - "The American Vice President" – American Experience (PBS) – Michelle Ferrari
  - "The Cancer Detectives" – American Experience (PBS) – Gene Tempest
  - "Poisoned Ground: The Tragedy of Love Canal" – American Experience (PBS) – Jamila Ephron
  - The Space Race (National Geographic) – Mark Monroe

==== News ====
| **News Script – Regularly Scheduled, Bulletin, or Breaking Report**: **"Willie Mays Tribute" – CBS Newspath (CBS News) – Gerald Mazza**; "Alabama IVF Ruling Sends Shockwaves Across America" – CBS Weekend News (CBS News) – James Hutton and Rob Rivielle; "Assassination Attempt" – CBS Evening News – Special Weekend Edition (CBS News) – Craig Wilson, James Hutton, Claudine Cleophat, Joe Clines and Rob Rivielle | **News Script – Analysis, Feature, or Commentary**: **"The Resistance" – 60 Minutes (CBS News) – Scott Pelley, Nicole Young and Kristin Steve**; "Finding Cillian Murphy" – 60 Minutes (CBS News) – Scott Pelley, Nicole Young and Kristin Steve; "Fine Print: Carl Hiaasen" – CBS Sunday Morning (CBS News) – Written by Richard Buddenhagen and Lesley Stahl; "History Repeats Itself in Northern Gaza One Year Later" – Ayman (MSNBC) – Rajaa Elidrissi; "Understanding Travel Advisories" (ABC NewsOne) – Erik Pierorazio |
**Digital News**: **"What Is Hamas Thinking Now?" (HuffPost) – Akbar Shahid Ahmed**; "The Food That Makes You Gay" (Eater) – Jaya Saxena; "Mise-en-Seine: A Paris Olympics Diary" (Slate) – Henry Grabar; "Sent by God" (Slate) – Molly Olmstead; "The Unraveling of Nancy Mace" (Slate) – Jim Newell

=== Radio ===
**Radio/Audio Documentary**: **"Art on Trial" – OneYear: 1990 Slate – Evan Chung**; "Deadly Exes: Domestic Violence Awareness with Annie Elise" – Serial Killers (Spotify Studios) – Maggie Admire; "A Hotbed of Homosexuality" – Slow Burn (Slate) – Christina Cauterucci; "If You Give a Mouse a Cookie... Will He Want a Welfare Check?" – Decoder Ring (Slate) – Cheyna Roth and Patrick Fort
| **Radio/Audio News Script – Regularly Scheduled, Bulletin, or Breaking Report**: **"Passages: Three Women Who Made A Difference" (CBS News Radio) – Gail Lee**; "6:40am News – November 6, 2023" (1010 WINS AM & FM) – Philip Pilato; "World News This Week – Week of December 15, 2023," (ABC News Radio) – Joan B. Harris; "Inside a Gaza Hospital" – What Next (Slate) – Mary Harris and Rob Gunther; "World News This Year 2023" (ABC News Radio) – Robert Hawley | **Radio/Audio News Script – Analysis, Feature, or Commentary**: **"Charles Osgood Remembered" (CBS News Radio) – Gail Lee**; "The Athleticism and Empathy of Horses" – Press Play 2024 (ABC News Radio) – Robert Hawley; "The Bleeding Edge" – Unexplainable (Vox) – Byrd Pinkerton |

=== Promotional Writing ===
**On-Air Promotion**
- **"LC Voting Ads" (YouTube) – Desireena Almoradie and Angad Bhalla**
  - "Fortune Favors the Bold. Promotions for Tracker and King & Conqueror" (CBS) – Molly Neylan
  - "NCIS: Season 21 Legacy, Launch and Beyond Trailers" (CBS) – Erial Tompkins
  - "NYSNA AMC Campaign" (YouTube) – Adrianna Hernandez Stewart and Angad Bhalla
