= Everything Happens for a Reason =

Everything Happens for a Reason may refer to:

- #GRATEFUL: Everything Happens For A Reason, a 2015 book published under the pseudonym Annoying Actor Friend
- "Everything Happens for a Reason", a song on Madison Beer's 2021 album Life Support
- "Everything Happens for a Reason", a song from Weezer's 2021 album OK Human
- Everything Happens for a Reason, 2014 Namibian film produced, and directed by Florian Schott
