= Danny Mefford =

American choreographer (born 1982)

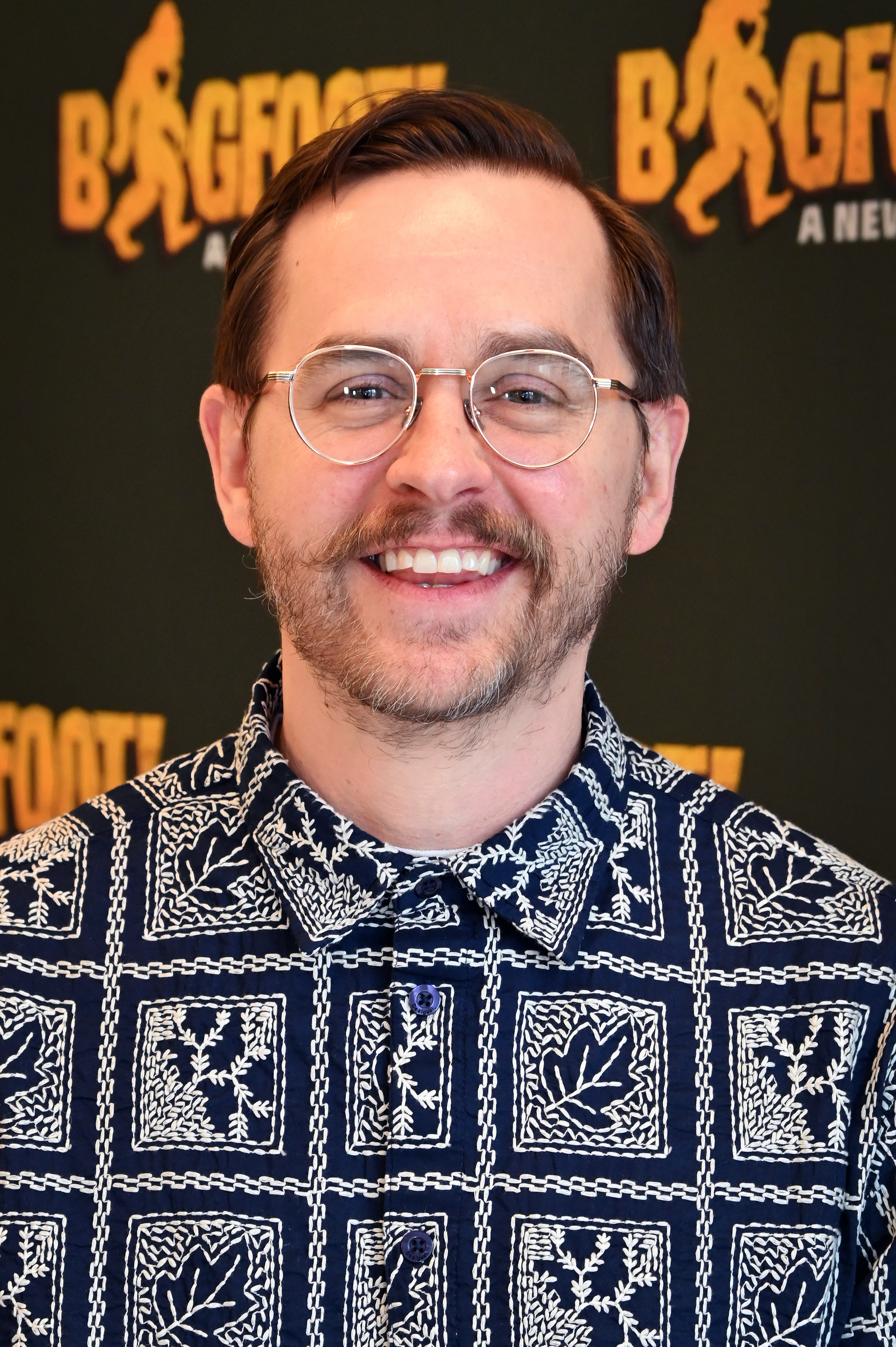
- Mefford in 2026
- Born: Daniel Ray Mefford; May 18, 1982
- Education: University of Evansville; Brown University / Trinity Rep (MFA)
- Occupations: Director, choreographer
- Known for: Dear Evan Hansen, Fun Home, Kimberly Akimbo, The 25th Annual Putnam County Spelling Bee (revival)

Danny Mefford is an American theatre director and choreographer. He has choreographed Broadway productions including Tony Award–winning musicals Dear Evan Hansen, Fun Home, and Kimberly Akimbo.

In the 2024–2025 season, Mefford directed and choreographed a revival of The 25th Annual Putnam County Spelling Bee at the John F. Kennedy Center for the Performing Arts; critics highlighted the production’s energy and ensemble work.

In addition to his work in theatre, Mefford has choreographed for television and film. His television credits include staging theatrical sequences for Rise on NBC, creating dance sequences for Dickinson on Apple TV+, and choreographing a sequence for Fleishman Is in Trouble on FX.

He is currently choreographing the film adaptation of Merrily We Roll Along, directed by Richard Linklater, a project being filmed over a twenty-year period.

== Early life and education ==
Mefford studied acting at the University of Evansville and later earned a Master of Fine Arts degree from the Brown University / Trinity Repertory Company program before moving to New York City.

== Career ==
Mefford began his professional career as an actor before shifting his focus to choreography following an opportunity at the Williamstown Theatre Festival, where he choreographed Bloody Bloody Andrew Jackson during the 2006 season. The experience marked a turning point, leading to additional work in downtown and regional theatre and establishing choreography as his primary discipline.

Among Mefford’s early projects was the musical Miss You Like Hell, which premiered at the La Jolla Playhouse and later ran Off-Broadway at The Public Theater, with book and lyrics by Quiara Alegría Hudes. Reviewing the production, the Los Angeles Times noted Mefford’s choreography for its emphasis on everyday movement and inclusivity, describing it as placing “everyday bodies…in jaunty motion” and calling it “democracy in theatrical action.”

Mefford went on to establish a significant presence on Broadway. His choreography credits include Bloody Bloody Andrew Jackson, The Bridges of Madison County, Fun Home, Dear Evan Hansen, and Kimberly Akimbo. His work has been profiled in national arts publications, which have highlighted his emphasis on character-driven movement and storytelling as central elements of his choreographic approach.

In addition to his Broadway work, Mefford has been active in large-scale touring productions. He served as choreographer for the North American tour of The Sound of Music, reuniting with Jack_O'Brien_(director) after their earlier collaboration on the 2015 tour. The updated production launched in 2025 at the Kennedy Center and continued into 2026, with performances in more than 55 cities across North America. Mefford directed the national touring production of Shrek the Musical, with music by Jeanine Tesori and book and lyrics by David Lindsay-Abaire.

Following The 25th Annual Putnam County Spelling Bee, Mefford began development on The Gorgeous Nothings, a new musical centered on six gay men incarcerated in New York City during the 1930s and the drag performances they created while imprisoned. He is also directing and choreographing Amber Ruffin's Off-Broadway musical Bigfoot! The Musical, which was announced with a complete cast in early 2026.

== Awards and nominations ==
Year	Award	Category	Work	Result	Ref.
2011	Fred & Astele Astaire Award	Outstanding Choreography in a Broadway Show	Bloody Bloody Andrew Jackson	Nominated	
2014	Drama Desk Award	Outstanding Choreography	Love’s Labour’s Lost	Nominated	
2022	Lucille Lortel Award	Outstanding Choreographer	Kimberly Akimbo	Nominated	
2026	Drama League Award	Outstanding Direction of a Musical	Bigfoot!	Pending	
2026	Drama League Award	Outstanding Direction of a Musical	The 25th Annual Putnam County Spelling Bee	Pending	
2026	Drama Desk Award	Outstanding Direction of a Musical	The 25th Annual Putnam County Spelling Bee	Pending	

== Selected works ==
=== Broadway (choreographer) ===
- Bloody Bloody Andrew Jackson
- The Bridges of Madison County
- Dear Evan Hansen
- Fun Home
- Kimberly Akimbo

=== Direction ===
- The 25th Annual Putnam County Spelling Bee (Kennedy Center; director and choreographer)
- Bigfoot! (Off-Broadway; director and choreographer)
- The Fitzgeralds of St. Paul (director and choreographer)
