= Writers Guild of America Award for Television: TV & New Media Motion Pictures =

- Awarded for: Outstanding Writing for a TV & New Media Motion Picture
- Country: United States
- Presented by: Writers Guild of America
- First award: 2022
- Currently held by: Deep Cover (2025)
- Website: www.wga.org

The Writers Guild of America Award for Television: Best TV & New Media Motion Picture is an award presented by the Writers Guild of America to the writers of the best television movie/direct-to-streaming film. It has been awarded since the 75th Annual Writers Guild of America Awards in 2022. Previously, television movie/direct-to-streaming films were awarded in two separate categories: Long Form - Adapted and Long Form - Original. During this time, series were grouped with limited series, which now have their own category (Limited Series).

The year indicates when each film aired. The winners are highlighted in gold.

== 2020s ==
Year	Program	Writer(s)	Network
2022 (75th)
2022 (75th)	Honor Society	David A. Goodman	Paramount+
2022 (75th)	Heart of the Matter	Karen Struck	Lifetime
2022 (75th)	Ray Donovan: The Movie	David Hollander & Liev Schreiber	Showtime
2022 (75th)	Torn Hearts	Rachel Koller Croft	Epix
2022 (75th)	Weird: The Al Yankovic Story	Eric Appel & Al Yankovic	The Roku Channel
2023 (76th)
2023 (76th)	Quiz Lady	Jen D'Angelo	Hulu
2023 (76th)	Finestkind	Brian Helgeland	Paramount+
2023 (76th)	Mr. Monk's Last Case: A Monk Movie	Andy Breckman	Peacock
2023 (76th)	No One Will Save You	Brian Duffield	Hulu
2023 (76th)	Totally Killer	David Matalon & Sasha Perl-Raver and Jen D'Angelo	Prime Video
2024 (77th)
2024 (77th)	The Great Lillian Hall	Elisabeth Seldes Annacone	HBO
2024 (77th)	Prom Dates	D.J. Mausner	Hulu
2024 (77th)	Rebel Ridge	Jeremy Saulnier	Netflix
2024 (77th)	Terry McMillan Presents: Forever	Bart Baker	Lifetime
2025 (78th)
2025 (78th)	Deep Cover	Derek Connolly & Colin Trevorrow	Prime Video
2025 (78th)	The Best You Can	Michael J. Weithorn	Sony Pictures Home Entertainment
2025 (78th)	The Life List	Adam Brooks; based on the novel by Lori Nelson Spielman	Netflix
2025 (78th)	Swiped	Bill Parker & Rachel Lee Goldenberg and Kim Caramele	Hulu

== Total awards by network ==
- HBO – 1 award
- Hulu – 1 award
- Paramount+ – 1 award
- Prime Video – 1 award

== Total nominations by network ==
- Hulu – 4 nominations
- Lifetime – 2 nominations
- Netflix – 2 nominations
- Paramount+ – 2 nominations
- Prime Video – 2 nominations
- Epix – 1 nomination
- HBO – 1 nomination
- Peacock – 1 nomination
- The Roku Channel – 1 nomination
- Showtime – 1 nomination
- Sony Pictures Home Entertainment – 1 nomination
