= Jennifer Vanasco =

American journalist

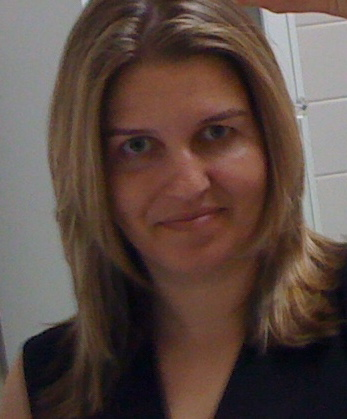
- Vanasco in 2009
- Born: Garden City, New York, U.S.
- Education: Wellesley College (BA)
- Occupations: Journalist, editor, author
- Spouse: Jenny Hagel (m. 2012)
- Children: 1

Jennifer Vanasco (born 1971 or 1972) is an American radio journalist. A culture editor at NPR, she previously edited news and culture stories at WNYC. She created and wrote the Minority Reports column for Columbia Journalism Review, is a former syndicated columnist for the gay press, and was the editor in chief of the defunct 365gay.com and a theater critic for the Chicago Reader.

== Biography ==
Vanasco grew up in Garden City, New York and attended Wellesley College, where she graduated cum laude in 1994 with a B.A. in philosophy. After graduating, Vanasco was associate editor at the gay paper Windy City Times in Chicago, worked as a writer for the University of Chicago, and eventually became a freelance writer and journalism teacher. She published work in the Chicago Tribune, the Advocate, the Chicago Reader, the Progressive Media Service, TimeOut Chicago and the now defunct Girlfriends magazine. Vanasco has written for The Village Voice, Fodor's Travel Guides, Sherman's Travel and more than a dozen gay publications.

She was the editor in chief of 365gay.com and blogged for the Huffington Post. She is a member of the Independent Gay Forum. Her column has been running weekly since its debut in Windy City Times in 1996 (it now runs in the Chicago Free Press) and won three Peter Lisagor Awards for opinion writing from the Society of Professional Journalists' Chicago Headline Club. She writes about travel, the arts, and social and political issues relevant to gays, lesbians, bisexuals and transgender people, including gay marriage, gays in the military, and gay social life.

Vanasco joined WNYC in 2013. She became an editor for NPR's culture desk in 2022.

Vanasco lives in Washington Heights, Manhattan with her wife, Late Night with Seth Meyers writer Jenny Hagel, and her son.

== Published works ==
- The Glamour Factor and the Fiji Effect, Reading the 'L' Word: Outing Contemporary Television, I.B. Tauris Press, London, 2006
- May 16, I Do, I Don't: Queers on Marriage, Suspect Thoughts Press, San Francisco, 2004
- Grand Haven & Holland; South Haven & Saugatuck/Douglas, Where to Weekend Around Chicago, Fodor's, 2004
