= Cooked with Cannabis =

- Genre: Reality
- Country of origin: United States
- Original language: English
- No. of seasons: 1
- No. of episodes: 6

Production
- Running time: 32–37 minutes

Original release
- Network: Netflix
- Release: April 20, 2020

Cooked with Cannabis is a 2020 reality television series. The premise revolves around a cooking competition where recreational marijuana is used as an ingredient.

== Cast ==
- Kelis
- Leather Storrs

== Notable contestants and diners ==
- Coreen Carroll, winner of episode 3, "I Do Cannabis"
- El-P
- Meghan Gailey
- Elle King
- Ricki Lake
- Jo Koy
- Mary Lynn Rajskub
- Nate Robinson
- John Salley
- Amanda Seales
- Alaska Thunderfuck
- Too $hort
- Michael Voltaggio

== Release ==
Cooked with Cannabis was released on April 20, 2020, on Netflix.

On March 31, 2021, Netflix removed the show from its Singapore platform to comply with takedown requests from the Infocomm Media Development Authority (IMDA).
