= Bigfoot! The Musical =

2024 musical comedy

- Promotional windowcard
- Music: David Schmoll
- Lyrics: Amber Ruffin
- Book: Amber Ruffin; Kevin Sciretta
- Premiere: February 11, 2026: New York City Center, New York
- Productions: 2026 Off-Broadway

Bigfoot! The Musical is a musical comedy with lyrics by Amber Ruffin, music by David Schmoll, and a book by Ruffin and Kevin Sciretta. The Off-Broadway production began previews on February 11, 2026, at New York City Center.

== Productions ==
=== Inception and development ===
Ruffin and collaborators Kevin Sciretta and David Schmoll began developing Bigfoot! in 2015 at Los Angeles' Sacred Fools Theater Company, as part of the long-running sketch comedy show "Serial Killers" in which concept shows compete against each other week-to-week.

The show first premiered as a one-act musical in the summer of 2018 at the Majestic Repertory Theatre in Las Vegas. Its second iteration was produced by ColdTowne Theater in as part of the 2019 Austin Sketch Fest in Texas.

The musical was staged as a concert at 54 Below in New York City on February 5, 2024. The cast consisted of Justin Guarini, Bonnie Milligan, Alex Moffat, Alex Newell, and Larry Owens. It was subsequently produced with a different creative team and cast as part of the 2024 Hollywood Fringe Festival, winning the festival's Fringe Award for Musicals & Operas. The musical was workshopped as part of the 2024 summer season of New York Stage and Film at Marist College in Poughkeepsie, New York. The production, directed by Ruffin, with a cast of Justin Guarini, Jade Jones, Taran Killam, Janelle McDermoth, and Larry Owens.

=== Off-Broadway ===
On September 12, 2025, it was announced that the musical would premiere Off-Broadway at New York City Center Stage I in a co-production between Benson Drive Productions and Manhattan Theatre Club and it would be directed and choreographed by Danny Mefford. Previews began on February 11, 2026, followed by a March 1 opening night, and ran through April 26. The production was praised for its strong casting, slapstick humor, and political satire.

== Musical numbers ==
- "Muddirt" – Company
- "Day To Day" – Bigfoot, Company
- "Splashtown" – Mayor, As Cast, Joanne, Doctor, Francine
- "Maybe" – Francine
- "You'll Look Good" – Bigfoot
- "On The Wings" – Mayor, CEO: As Cast
- "My Love Burns" – Doctor, Francine
- "Forest" – Townspeople: As Cast, Francine, Joanne, Doctor
- "When You Come Around" – Bigfoot, Joanne
- "Shoot Away" – Bigfoot
- "Mommy" – Bigfoot, Company
- "On The Wings (Reprise)" – Mayor, CEO: As Cast
- "Finale" – Company

== Characters and casts ==
Character	Concert	Workshop	Off-Broadway
Character	2024	2025	2026
Doctor	Justin Guarini	Justin Guarini	Jason Tam
Francine	Alex Newell	Jade Jones	Crystal Lucas-Perry
Mayor	Alex Moffat	Taran Killam	Alex Moffat
Joanne	Bonnie Milligan	Janelle McDermoth	Katerina McCrimmon
Bigfoot	Larry Owens	Larry Owens	Grey Henson
Ensemble	—N/a	—N/a	Jade Jones

== Awards and nominations ==
=== Off-Broadway production ===
Year	Award	Category	Work	Result	Ref.
2026	Drama League Awards	Outstanding Production of a Musical		Nominated	
2026	Drama League Awards	Outstanding Direction of a Musical	Danny Mefford	Nominated	
2026	Drama League Awards	Distinguished Performance	Grey Henson	Nominated	
2026	Lucille Lortel Award	Outstanding Musical		Nominated	
