= The Great Lillian Hall =

2024 film by Michael Cristofer

- Promotional poster
- Genre: Drama
- Written by: Elisabeth Seldes Annacone
- Directed by: Michael Cristofer
- Starring: Jessica Lange; Kathy Bates; Lily Rabe; Jesse Williams; Pierce Brosnan
- Music by: Mac Quayle
- Country of origin: United States
- Original language: English

Production
- Executive producers: Tom Cappello; Jessica Lange; Kathy Bates; Michael Cristofer; Alex Platis
- Producers: Bruce Cohen; Steven Rogers; Scott Thigpen; Marie Halliday; George Scarles
- Cinematography: Simon Dennis
- Editor: Joseph Krings
- Running time: 110 minutes
- Production companies: HBO Films; Crazy Legs Features; Kolton Pancake; Bold Choices Productions

Original release
- Network: HBO
- Release: May 31, 2024

The Great Lillian Hall is a 2024 American drama television film directed by Michael Cristofer and written by Elisabeth Seldes Annacone. The film stars Jessica Lange, Kathy Bates, Lily Rabe, Jesse Williams, and Pierce Brosnan. It premiered on HBO on May 31, 2024. The film is loosely inspired by American stage actress Marian Seldes, who was the screenwriter's aunt.

== Cast ==
- Jessica Lange as Lillian Hall
- Kathy Bates as Edith Wilson
- Lily Rabe as Margaret Tanner
- Jesse Williams as David
- Pierce Brosnan as Ty Maynard

== Production ==
The film was originally announced in 2021 under the title Places, Please with Meryl Streep attached in the lead role. Filming would take place in New York City. Production ended up starting in May 2023 in Atlanta and Marietta, Georgia, with a cast led by Jessica Lange, Kathy Bates and Lily Rabe, and wrapped at the end of June 2023. It is a Crazy Legs Features production.

It was announced in May 2024 that the film, now called The Great Lillian Hall, was set to air on HBO and the main cast also included Jesse Williams and Pierce Brosnan.

== Reception ==
=== Critical reception ===
On the review aggregator website Rotten Tomatoes, 93% of 14 critics' reviews are positive, with an average rating of 7.1/10. Metacritic, which uses a weighted average, assigned the film a score of 78 out of 100, based on 5 critics, indicating "generally favorable" reviews.

=== Accolades ===
| Award | Date of ceremony | Category | Recipient(s) | Result | Ref. |
|---|---|---|---|---|---|
| Screen Actors Guild Awards | February 23, 2025 | Outstanding Performance by a Female Actor in a Miniseries or Television Movie | Kathy Bates | Nominated | |
| Writers Guild of America Awards | February 15, 2025 | Outstanding Writing: TV & New Media Motion Pictures | Elisabeth Seldes-Annacone | Won | |
