= Coreen Carroll =

German-American chef and cannabis activist

- Born: Germany
- Education: University of North Florida; San Francisco Cooking School
- Years active: 2012–present (in cannabis cuisine)
- Known for: Co-creator of Cannaisseur Series, co-author of Edibles: Small Bites for the Modern Cannabis Kitchen, competitor on Cooked With Cannabis
- Spouse: Ryan Bush
- Culinary career
- Cooking style: Cannabis cuisine
- Television show(s): Cooked With Cannabis (2020)
- Award(s) won: High Times Cannabis Cup award for best edible (2014)

Coreen Carroll is a German-American chef specializing in cannabis cuisine. She co-created the Cannaisseur Series, an underground cannabis pop-up restaurant based in the San Francisco Bay Area in California.

== Early life and education ==
Carroll was born and raised in Germany. She moved to Florida in the 1990s. She has a degree in International Business from the University of North Florida. She attended the San Francisco Cooking School.

== Career ==
Carroll's first career was in the field of medical device regulation.

Carroll came to California from Jacksonville, Florida in 2012, with her partner, Ryan Bush. They had planned to open a dispensary with a restaurant, but uncertainties about legality and evolving cannabis enforcement in California changed their plans. Carroll entered cooking school, after which she and Bush started an edibles company, Madame Munchie, which they later sold to a business partner. Carroll and Bush also began hosting prix-fixe underground cannabis dinners, brunches, and "High Teas" under the name "Cannaisseur Series" in May of 2015. Her events were featured by Seeker in a documentary short. Carroll focuses on pairing types of cannabis with food and sources locally for both. Carroll's events typically are partially underwritten by sponsors.

In addition to her events, she does catering of private cannabis popups and in-home cannabis cooking services. Carroll co-authored with Stephanie Hua the cannabis cookbook, Edibles: Small Bites for the Modern Cannabis Kitchen, published by Chronicle Books. In 2020, Carroll also competed in the Netflix television series Cooked With Cannabis, winning the third episode, "I Do Cannabis".

Carroll also works to promote fully legalizing cannabis cuisine and helped found Crop to Kitchen Community.

== Recognition ==
In 2014 Carroll won a High Times Cannabis Cup award for best edible for her Madame Munchie macarons. She was named one of America's Top 10 Cannabis Chefs by GreenState, a cannabis-focused publication produced by the San Francisco Chronicle. Aspen Times called Edibles: Small Bites for the Modern Cannabis Kitchen one of the "best high-minded bibles for budding cannabis chefs."

== Personal life ==
Carroll is married to Ryan Bush, who is also her business partner. The couple live in San Francisco.
