= Annoying Actor Friend =

Internet Personality and Commentator

Annoying Actor Friend (established July 13, 2012) is a satirical Internet personality, created to make cultural commentary on the Broadway theatre industry. For over three years, Annoying Actor Friend operated anonymously, and on December 9, 2015, its identity was revealed as writer Andrew Briedis.

Annoying Actor Friend began as a Twitter account (@Actor_Friend) and quickly expanded into a blog, book series, and live cabaret show at 54 Below. Annoying Actor Friend's first book, #SOBLESSED: The Annoying Actor Friend's Guide to Werking in Show Business debuted at #1 on Amazon's Theatre/Parody list. A 'choose-your-own-show-business-destiny' sequel, #GRATEFUL: Everything Happens For A Reason was released on November 30, 2015.

Annoying Actor Friend was nominated for a 2015 Shorty Award, which honors the best of social media.

== #SOBLESSED: The Annoying Actor Friend's Guide to Werking in Show Business ==
=== Book ===
#SOBLESSED: The Annoying Actor Friend's Guide to Werking in Show Business was published on October 3, 2013. The book uses satire to provide actors with advice on navigating the Broadway industry. A 'choose-your-own-show-business-destiny' sequel, #GRATEFUL: Everything Happens For A Reason was released on November 30, 2015.

=== Audiobook ===
In October 2014, the audiobook version of #SOBLESSED: The Annoying Actor Friend's Guide to Werking in Show Business, was released, featuring narration by Broadway veterans Alan Cumming, Megan Hilty, Lesli Margherita, Will Swenson, Keala Settle, Tituss Burgess, Andrew Keenan-Bolger, Krysta Rodriguez, and Brian Dennehy. All proceeds benefit Broadway Cares/Equity Fights AIDS.

=== Live cabaret ===
On September 20, 2014, #SOBLESSEDLIVE, a cabaret version of #SOBLESSED: The Annoying Actor Friend's Guide to Werking in Show Business was performed at the acclaimed NYC venue, 54 Below. Featuring performances from Corey Cott, Lesli Margherita, Nic Rouleau, and others, the performance followed the format of the book, telling the story of a working New York actor, from college to working on Broadway, and beyond. Later iterations of the concert were performed with new cast members on February 7, 2015, and July 27, 2015.

== Movements ==
=== Actors' Equity Association ===
In November 2013, AnnoyingActorFriend.com released a portion of #SOBLESSED that featured the history of Broadway touring productions, and the recent decline in salary and working conditions suffered by touring actors, due to tiered production contracts and the new Short Arrangement Touring Agreement (SETA). The following month, audition notices were posted for the national tours of Kinky Boots and Newsies, which confirmed rumors that the tours were to go out on Tier C and Tier D production contracts, which dictate a significantly reduced salary for touring actors, in comparison to their Broadway counterparts. Through its web site, Annoying Actor Friend encouraged Actor's Equity Association (AEA) union members to band together in order to prevent the further decline of their working conditions and salaries. By January, Annoying Actor Friend had garnered enough attention that AEA council members announced that they would devote an entire member meeting to the subject of touring contracts, and The New York Times ran an article on the state of Broadway touring productions citing Annoying Actor Friend's contribution to igniting the movement.

=== #Dim4Joan ===
Shortly after Joan Rivers died on September 4, 2014, The Broadway League announced that they would not dim Broadway's marquees to honor the famous comedian, actress, and Broadway supporter. On September 8, Annoying Actor Friend created the hashtag #Dim4Joan, urging fellow tweeters to use the hashtag as a means of convincing the Broadway League to change its mind. The hashtag rapidly reached trending status. Beginning with Jordan Roth, theatre owners began to announce that they would dim their marquees on September 9, at 6:45 PM. The League ultimately released an official statement saying that all Broadway theaters would dim their marquees to honor Rivers. A similar movement, #Dim4Kyle, occurred in August 2015, following the premature death of Kyle Jean-Baptiste, who made history on July 23, 2015 as the first African-American and youngest actor to play Jean Valjean in Les Misérables on Broadway.

== Awaresie Awards ==
Created to honor contributions made to the Broadway community that are not recognized by the Tony Awards, the first annual Awaresie Awards ceremony was released online via YouTube on June 1, 2015, and featured many of Annoying Actor Friend's frequent collaborators, such as Krysta Rodriguez and Megan Hilty, as presenters.

== Other accolades ==
In 2014, Annoying Actor Friend wrote a monthly column for Backstage called "The Working Actor."

== Blessedterns ==
On October 1, 2014, Annoying Actor Friend announced the addition of an intern personality, known as @Blessedterns, to his/her brand. The account is currently run by Ashlee Latimer, and functions as a satirical commentary on intern and fan culture within the Broadway and larger theatrical community.
