= Megan Gailey =

American comedian and actress

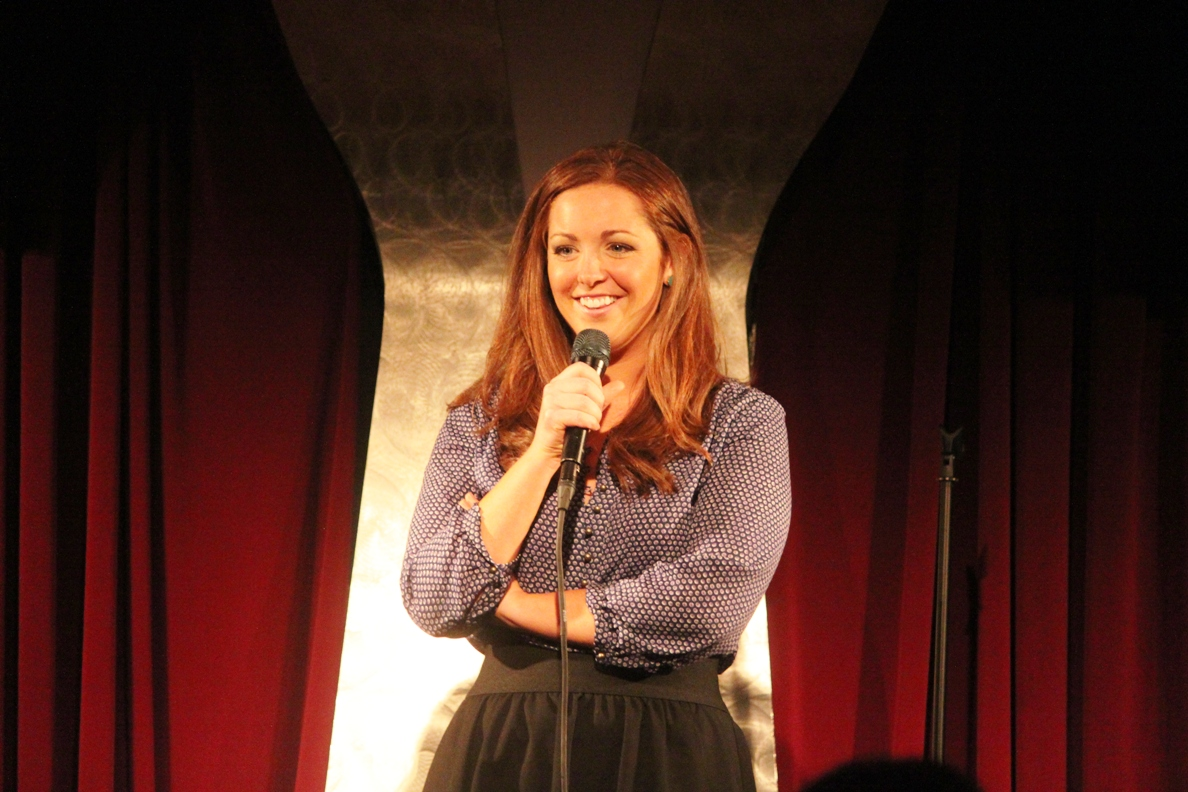
- Gailey in 2013
- Born: February 17, 1986 (age 40); Indianapolis, Indiana, U.S.
- Education: Purdue University
- Spouse: C.J. Toledano
- Children: 2

Comedy career
- Years active: 2012–present
- Medium: Stand-up; podcasting; television; film

Megan Gailey is an American stand-up comedian, actress and podcast host.

== Career ==
Gailey has also appeared on The Tonight Show Starring Jimmy Fallon, Conan, @midnight, and After Midnight. She was selected as a "New Face" at the Montréal Just for Laughs festival in 2015. She has written for the 2017 ESPY Award. She was an official performer at SXSW. She released a comedy album, My Dad Paid for This, in 2019.

== Filmography ==
Megan Gailey filmography
Year	Title	Role	Note
2012	Life Support	Michelle	TV movie
2013	Sick Day Morning Show	Herself	TV movie
2015	Conan	Herself	1 episode
2016	The Real World	Herself	1 episode
2016	The Guest List	Herself	1 episode
2016	Ladylike	Herself	8 episodes
2016	Adam DeVine's House Party	Herself	1 episode
2017	@midnight	Herself	1 episode
2017	George Washington: DTF	Herself	1 episode
2018	The Half Hour	Herself	1 episode
2018	Straight Up, Stand Up	Herself	1 episode
2018	You Didn't Want to Know	Herself	1 episode
2019	Raph's Hall of Fame	Herself	1 episode
2019	The Tonight Show Starring Jimmy Fallon	Herself	1 episode
2019–20	Lights Out with David Spade	Herself	6 episodes
2020	Cooked with Cannabis	Herself	1 episode
2020	The Stand-Up Show with Jon Dore	Herself	1 episode
2020	Nice One!	Herself	1 episode
2020	Tournament of Laughs	Herself	2 episodes
2021	Pause with Sam Jay	Sisterhood of the Seahorse	2 episodes
2021	This Joka	Herself	TV series
2025	Crowd Control	Herself	1 episode

== Personal life ==
Gailey is married to comedian, writer and sports podcast host C.J. Toledano. They have 2 sons.
