= Teresa Lo =

American writer

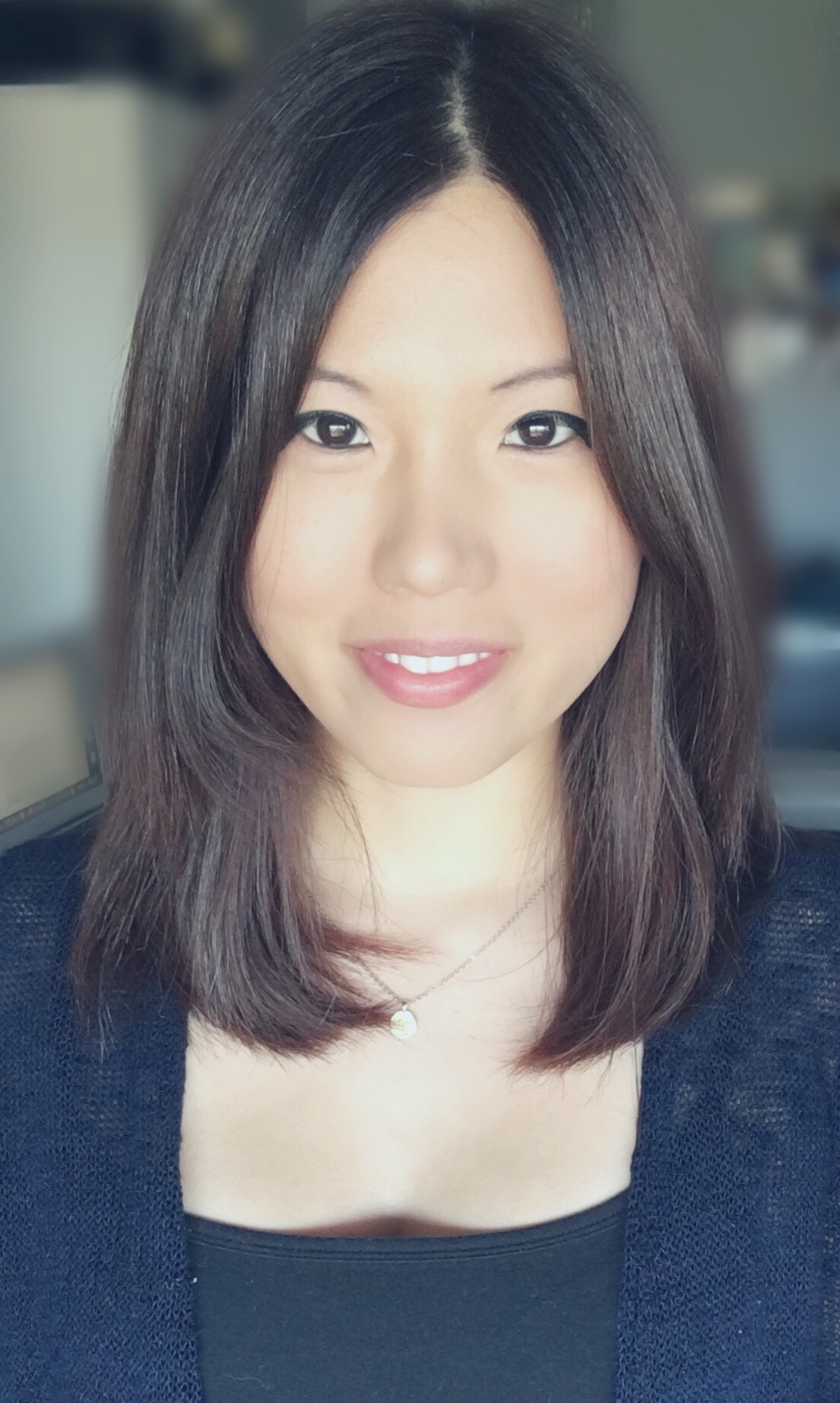

Teresa Lo is an American writer and standup comedian. Lo has a Masters in Fine Arts in Writing for Screen and Television from the University of Southern California. She has a bachelor's degree in history from the University of Kansas, and KU named her a Woman of Distinction, one of the highest honors the university bestows upon female alumni or students.

== Writing ==
Teresa Lo is best known for her work as a journalist for Hustler Magazine. She has also contributed to Popsugar, Buzzfeed, Yahoo, The University Daily Kansan, and numerous other publications.

Her young adult novel, Hell's Game, was an Amazon bestseller in 2013; and her Asian-American series, The Red Lantern Scandals, received media attention because of its graphic depiction of Asian-American female sexuality. Hyphen Magazine wrote, "The book is not just about sex but about discovering and celebrating one’s independence." The Red Lantern Scandals was adapted for television by 20th Century Fox, but the series never aired.

In 2013, Lo was the judge of Hyphen Magazine's first ever erotica writing contest.

Lo was a staff writer on HBO's Pause with Sam Jay, and she was nominated for a WGA Writing Award for Best Comedy Variety Sketch Series.

== Selected works ==
- Realities: a Collection of Short Stories (Author)
- The Other Side: a Collection of Short Stories (Author)
- Hell's Game (Author)
- The Red Lantern Scandals (Author)
- The Sugar Baby Club (Author)

== Comedy ==
Teresa Lo is a national touring standup comedian; and she has been named Burbank Comedy Festival Best of the Fest, Palm Springs International Comedy Festival Audience Award Winner, San Diego Comedy Festival Finalist, OC Comedy Contest Winner, and more.

In 2023, her directorial debut, Breaking the Fourth Wall, a feature documentary about the Los Angeles open mic scene, premiered at the Hollywood Reel Independent Film Festival at LA Live. The film is now available to stream on Tubi and Amazon Prime.
