= Andrew Briedis =

American writer and comedian

- Occupation: Writer
- Years active: 2012 - Present

Andrew Briedis is an American writer, comedian, satirist, and actor. He is best known for creating the satirical Internet personality Annoying Actor Friend. He has written for Saturday Night Live and appeared on Netflix's Unbreakable Kimmy Schmidt.

== Early life ==
Briedis grew up in San Diego, CA and attended La Costa Canyon High School (LCC), then The Hartt School where he pursued a degree in theatre.

== Annoying Actor Friend ==
In 2012, Briedis launched Annoying Actor Friend on Twitter. The account initially operated anonymously and satirized the social media behavior of actors, specifically those who work in the Broadway industry. It immediately caught the attention of the theatrical community, inspiring Briedis to write a book under the pseudonym entitled #SOBLESSED: The Annoying Actor Friend's Guide to Werking in Show Business which debuted on Amazon as the #1 Theater and Parody book in 2013. An audiobook benefiting Broadway Cares/Equity Fights AIDS was released in 2014 and features a voice cast of Alan Cumming, Megan Hilty, Lesli Margherita, Will Swenson, Keala Settle, Tituss Burgess, Andrew Keenan-Bolger, Krysta Rodriguez, and Brian Dennehy. A sequel to #SOBLESSED entitled #GRATEFUL: Everything Happens for a Reason was released in 2015.

Briedis revealed his identity in 2015 and was nominated for a Shorty Award honoring excellence in Social Media for his work on Annoying Actor Friend.

== Career ==
Briedis has served as a guest writer for Saturday Night Live. He currently writes and performs on the web series Turning the Tables.
