= Jaye McBride =

American stand-up comedian and graphic novel artist

- Education: University at Albany
- Occupations: Stand-up comedian; graphic novel artist
- Website: https://jayemcbride.com/

Jaye McBride is an American stand-up comedian and graphic novel artist. McBride is the first openly transgender American comedian to perform at Madison Square Garden, as one of the comics opening for Louis C.K. In 2015, McBride did a TEDx Albany talk,Trans 102: Life After Transition, where she spoke about the "next steps for understanding and equality for the Trans community."

In 2022, McBride was named on Vulture's "Comedians You Should and Will Know" list.

== Early life and education ==
Jaye McBride was raised Catholic in the small town of Westport, New York, one of four boys. She loved stand-up comedy; as a kid, she watched Jake Johannsen on Letterman. When she was in seventh grade, she did stand-up at the school talent show. She didn't do stand-up again until after graduating with a double major in math and psychology from University at Albany,

== Career ==
=== Stand-Up ===
Jaye McBride began stand-up in 2009 in Albany. She was a staple on the local scene when Aziz Ansari met her in 2015 at Albany's Comedy Works during his sold-out run, and later, she opened for him on his tour. In 2017, McBride left Albany for Los Angeles, and then in 2018, New York.

In 2018, McBride became the first Trans comic to become a regular at Broadway Comedy Club in New York City. Broadway Comedy Club owner Al Martin said of adding McBride that “our crowd was comprised of fifty-percent New Yorkers and fifty- percent tourists. Both groups loved her. She killed and that's my criteria when judging comics. I ask myself ‘is this comic incredibly funny?’Jaye absolutely is. So I immediately passed her into the club.”

In 2019, McBride became the first Trans comic to be added to the roster at the Comedy Cellar.

McBride was named part of the lineup in the "New Faces of Comedy" in 2021 at Just For Laughs in Montreal. She is the first American Trans comic to perform at Madison Square Garden, in 2021, opening with Lynn Koplitz and Greer Barnes for Louis C.K.

In 2022, McBride performed at Netflix is a Joke Festival on Amy Schumer's "Parental Advisory" show, which later streamed on the platform. In 2023, McBride released her first stand-up special, Daddy's Girl.

=== Writing ===
McBride was a writer on Inside Amy Schumer and Life & Beth. She also wrote for Lizz Winstead's Lady Parts Justice, as well as performed on the 2017 Vagical Mystery Tour with Mehran Khaghani, Ian Harvie, Alex English, Joyelle Nicole Johnson, and others. Her debut graphic novel, Amelia, was published in 2024.

== Personal ==
McBride transitioned in 2007 and uses she/her pronouns. McBride lives in New York.
