= Sam Jay =

American comedian and writer

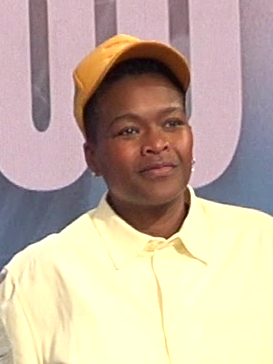
- Sam Jay in 2025
- Born: Samaria Johnson; January 13, 1982 (age 44); Atlanta, Georgia, U.S.
- Occupations: Comedian, writer
- Years active: 2012–present
- Spouse: Yanise Monet (2010–2025)

Samaria Johnson (born January 13, 1982), better known as Sam Jay, is an American comedian and writer. She is the first Black lesbian writer for Saturday Night Live (2017–2020), and was nominated for an Emmy Award for Outstanding Writing For A Variety Series three times. She's had two streaming comedy specials, 2023's Sam Jay: Salute Me or Shoot Me on HBO Max and on Netflix 2020's 3 in the Morning. Jay is the co-creator and co-star of the HBO comedy series Pause with Sam Jay (2021–2022) and the Peacock comedy series Bust Down (2022).

== Early life ==
Jay was born Samaria Johnson in Atlanta on January 13, 1982. She grew up in the Dorchester neighborhood of Boston, and studied for a degree in communications but quit due to lack of interest.

== Career ==
After years of working in an office and as a music manager, Jay performed her first stand-up comedy routine in 2012, at the age of 29. In 2017, she joined the writing staff of Saturday Night Live, becoming the first black lesbian writer in the show's history and the second black lesbian to be involved with the show overall (after performer Danitra Vance joined the cast 32 years prior). She co-wrote the fifth "Black Jeopardy" sketch (April 7, 2018), in which the game's contestant is T'Challa (Chadwick Boseman). In 2018, she performed stand-up on Netflix's The Comedy Lineup and starred in a half-hour stand-up special for Comedy Central Stand-Up Presents.

Jay's first stand-up comedy release was Donna's Daughter (2018), which was made available as audio only. Her first Netflix stand-up comedy special, 3 in the Morning (2020), was filmed at The Masquerade in Atlanta and received acclaim. Her other work includes appearances on Flatbush Misdemeanors (2021–2022) and Take My Wife (2016–2018) and stand-up performances on Jimmy Kimmel Live! and at the 2017 Just for Laughs Comedy Festival.

In September 2020, it was announced that HBO had ordered a sitcom co-written by and starring Jay. She partnered with producer Prentice Penny to create the series, which was named PAUSE with Sam Jay. The first season premiered in May 2021, and the show was renewed by HBO for a second season two months later. The comedy series Bust Down, co-created and co-starring by Jay, premiered on Peacock in March 2022. Jay was one of the featured roasters at The Roast of Tom Brady, live on Netflix.

== Style ==
Jay's stage persona has been described as self-aware and observational, inviting comparisons to Patrice O'Neal.

== Comedy albums ==
Year	Title	Notes
2018	Donna's Daughter	Comedy Central Records
2020	3 in the Morning	Netflix
2023	Salute Me or Shoot Me	HBO

== Filmography ==
=== Film ===
- 2023: You People

=== Television ===
- 2012: Just for Laughs: All Access (TV series) – (episode: "Episode #6.6")
- 2015: Get Your Life (TV series) – Lady in Dickies (episode: "Girl Get Your Blacktresses")
- 2016: Take My Wife (TV series) – (episode: "Punchline")
- 2016: Flophouse (TV documentary) – (episode 8: "Haircuts at Babe Island")
- 2016: The Meltdown with Jonah and Kumail (TV series) – (episode: "The One Without Neil DeGrasse Tyson")
- 2017: Pinsky (TV series) – Sam
- 2017: Comedy Central Presents (TV series) – (episode: "Sam Jay")
- 2017–2020: Saturday Night Live (TV series) – writer
- 2018: Nobodies (TV series) – Andrea
- 2018: The Comedy Lineup (TV series) – executive producer, writer (episode: "Sam Jay")
- 2018: 2018 MTV Movie & TV Awards (TV special) – writer
- 2018: 70th Primetime Emmy Awards (TV special) – writer
- 2019: Broad City (TV series) – Doorwoman (episode: "Along Came Molly")
- 2019: Donald Glover Presents (TV mini-series) – writer (5 episodes)
- 2020: BET Awards 2020 (TV special) – writer
- 2020: Shrill (TV series) – Fran's Friend (2 episodes)
- 2020: 3 in the Morning (TV special) - writer, executive producer
- 2021: Kenan (TV series) – consulting producer
- 2021: That Damn Michael Che (TV series) – Barber (episode: "Well Played, Crackers")
- 2021: Pause with Sam Jay (TV series) – executive producer, writer
- 2021: Flatbush Misdemeanors (TV series) – Georgia (episodes: "retrograde" and "obiageli")
- 2022: Bust Down (TV series) – Sam, also co-creator, executive producer
- 2023: The Eric Andre Show (TV series) - Herself, cameo (episode: "Football Is Back)
- 2023: Sam Jay: Salute Me or Shoot Me (TV special) - writer, executive producer
- 2024: The Roast of Tom Brady (TV special) - herself

== Awards and nominations ==
- 2018: Emmys, Outstanding Writing for a Variety Series for Saturday Night Live (nominee)
- 2019: Emmys, Outstanding Writing for a Variety Series for Saturday Night Live (nominee)
- 2020: Writers Guild of America, Best Comedy/Variety – Sketch Series for Saturday Night Live (nominee)
