= Pause with Sam Jay =

American variety show

- Also known as: PAUSE with Sam Jay
- Genre: Talk show; Variety show
- Created by: Sam Jay; Prentice Penny
- Composer: Knxwledge
- Country of origin: United States
- Original language: English
- No. of seasons: 2
- No. of episodes: 14

Original release
- Network: HBO
- Release: May 21, 2021 – July 8, 2022

Pause with Sam Jay (stylized as PAUSE with Sam Jay) is a talk show and variety show created by Sam Jay and Prentice Penny for HBO. It aired for two seasons from May 21, 2021 to July 8, 2022.

== Premise ==
Each episode takes place in a house party, where comedian Sam Jay talks to guests over drinks about the episode's central topic. In an interview with Vanity Fair, Jay said, “Truly if you came to a party at my house, that’s what it would sound like. That’s how it would feel. That’s the vibe.”

== Episodes ==
Season	Episodes	Originally released		
Season	Episodes	First released	Last released	Network
1	6	May 21, 2021	June 25, 2021	HBO
2	8	May 20, 2022	July 8, 2022	HBO

=== Season 1 ===
No. overall	No. in season	Title	Original release date
1	1	"Coons"	May 21, 2021
2	2	"Tea-M.Z."	May 28, 2021
3	3	"Let Freedom Freak"	June 4, 2021
4	4	"Money and the American Way (a.k.a. NBA SamBoi, Never Broke Again)"	June 11, 2021
5	5	"Pregnant Studs"	June 18, 2021
6	6	"N.A.H.S.O.N"	June 25, 2021

=== Season 2 ===
No. overall	No. in season	Title	Original release date
7	1	"Eyes Wide Butt"	May 20, 2022
8	2	"The Crackas Is Coming"	May 27, 2022
9	3	"I Know Why the Caged Homie Sings"	June 3, 2022
10	4	"SMDK"	June 10, 2022
11	5	"Breakfast at Julia's"	June 17, 2022
12	6	"Forever Drunk"	June 24, 2022
13	7	"Sexual Miscalculations"	July 1, 2022
14	8	"Dead Momma Episode"	July 8, 2022

== Production ==
On July 8, 2021, the series was renewed for a second season.

On February 7, 2023, Jay revealed that Pause with Sam Jay had been cancelled after two seasons.

== Awards and nominations ==
Award	Year	Category	Result	Ref.
Writers Guild of America Awards	2022	Best Comedy/Variety – Sketch Series	Nominated	
Writers Guild of America Awards	2023	Best Comedy/Variety – Sketch Series	Nominated	
