= Rosebud Baker =

American comedian and actress

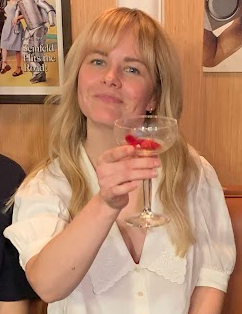
- Baker in 2025
- Born: Rosemary Baker; Alexandria, Virginia, U.S.
- Education: Emerson College (BA)
- Occupations: Comedian; actress; writer
- Years active: 2008–present
- Spouse: Andy Haynes (m. 2020–2026)
- Children: 1
- Relatives: James Baker (grandfather)
- Awards: WGA Award, Outstanding Writing Comedy/Variety Sketch Series "Inside Amy Schumer" (2023), Emmy-nominated for Writing on Comedy/Variety Sketch Series "Saturday Night Live" (2022, 2023, 2024)

Comedy career
- Medium: Stand-up
- Genres: Dark comedy; blue comedy
- Subjects: Death; American politics; interpersonal relationships; human sexuality; sobriety; domestic abuse
- Website: rosebudbaker.com

Rosemary "Rosebud" Baker is an American comedian, actress, and writer. Based in New York City, she is known for her dark humor based on personal, often satirical stories. In 2010, she worked as an actress in independent films, non-union television projects, and off-Broadway. She later began appearing in a recurring role on the Hulu series Life & Beth. In 2013, she received praise for her performance in the critically acclaimed independent film Turnabout. Baker started her career in stand-up in 2014 by performing at open mics throughout New York City. In 2021, her debut comedy special, Whiskey Fists, premiered on Comedy Central. She became a writer for the HBO Max television series That Damn Michael Che in 2020 and a writer for Saturday Night Live from 2022 to 2025. Her second comedy special, The Mother Lode, was released on Netflix on 18 February 2025.

== Early life and education ==
Baker was born in Alexandria, Virginia and grew up in McLean, Virginia. She has three surviving younger sisters as well as one deceased sister. Her father is James "Jamie" Baker IV, a retired senior partner at Baker Botts L.L.P. in Washington, D.C. and the son of James Addison Baker III, the former Secretary of Treasury of President Ronald Reagan and the Secretary of State under President George H. W. Bush, and her mother is Nancy, a painter born in Texas. As a child, she was given the nickname Bud due to her being a tomboy and refusing to wear dresses, which gave her the name Rosebud. Because of her family's connections to the Bush family, she would often visit the White House and spend time with George H. W. Bush's grandchildren. Baker's father was mostly absent in her life and emotionally distant due to his work.

Baker attended Langley High School, where she received mostly poor grades and was briefly a cheerleader before getting suspended from the squad. In June 2002, her 7-year-old sister, Graeme, (Note: The original article from 2002 in The Washington Post calls Baker's sister Virginia Graham Baker. In interviews, Baker has called her sister Graeme.) drowned after becoming caught in a whirlpool drain during an outdoor graduation party in McLean. In the wake of Graeme's death, Nancy successfully had the Virginia Graeme Baker Pool and Spa Safety Act passed in her name advocating for safer pool drains. Baker received a Bachelor of Arts in acting at Emerson College in 2006, where she also became severely alcoholic and depressed as a result of grief from the death of her sister, which she compared to "getting very old quickly". After going on a trip throughout Europe with middle sister Hallie and spending most of it intoxicated, she told her family she would come home to check herself into rehab, but instead moved to Brooklyn and moved in with her then-boyfriend. While in Brooklyn, she attended group therapy sessions, where she would often lie about herself, and later started seeing a grief counselor. She began attending Alcoholics Anonymous meetings, which helped her to become sober in 2007.

== Career ==
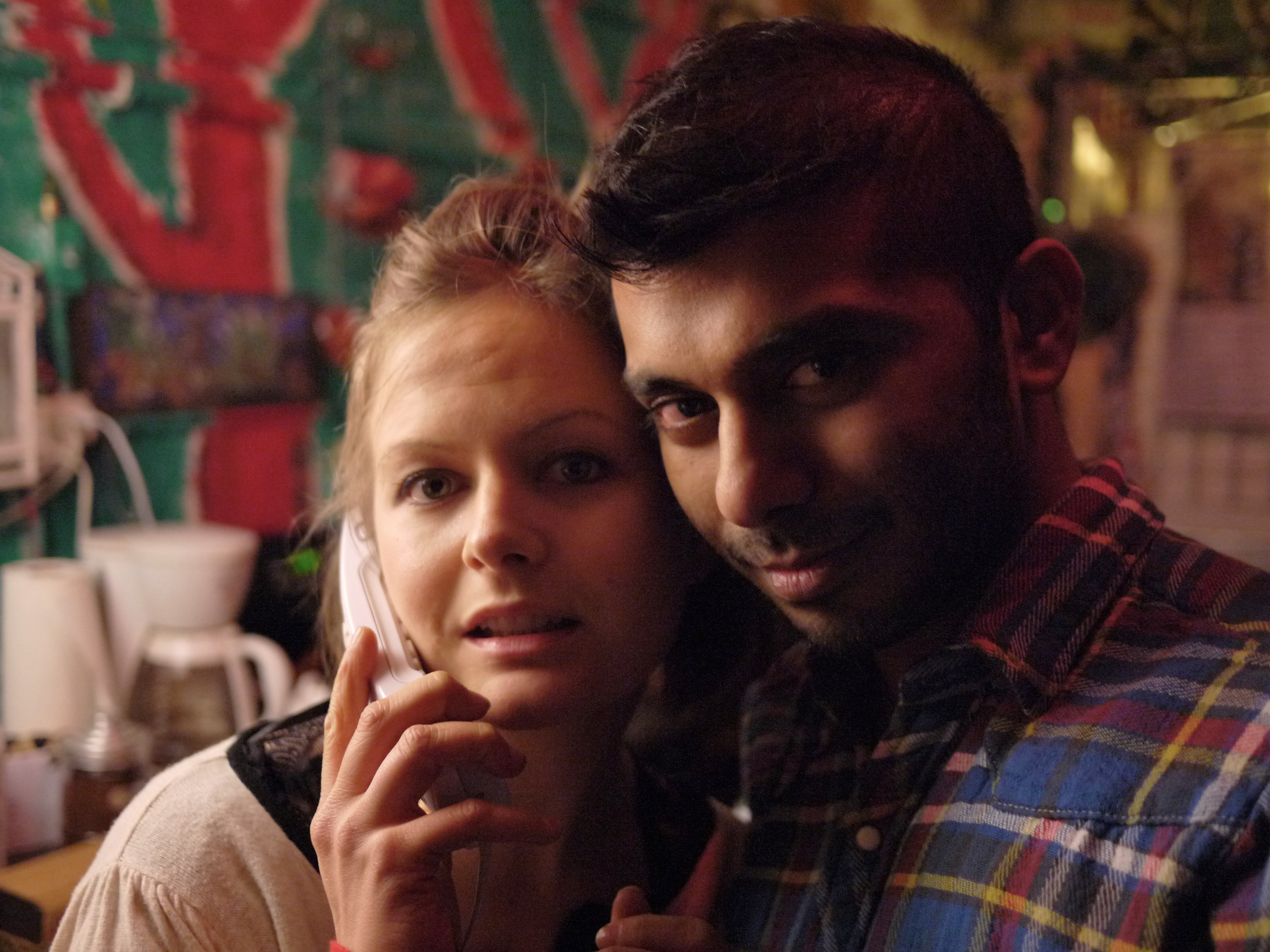
Baker and Sahil Farooqi, her gay friend in Girls Who Like Boys Who Like Boys, in 2011

While working as an actress in independent films and off-Broadway, Baker also worked on the side as a nanny and a waitress. She also wrote horoscopes for Elite Daily as Rosey Baker. In 2010, Baker appeared as a castmember on Girls Who Like Boys Who Like Boys, a Sundance Channel reality television series based on the lives of four gay men and their female best friends.

Baker's father later encouraged her to pursue stand-up comedy as a career. In 2014, Baker did stand-up for the first time during an open-mic night at a comedy club in Austin, Texas while on a cross-country road trip with a childhood friend. Her first performance in New York took place at the Metropolitan Room in Chelsea. Early in her comedy career, Baker performed four to five times a night at the LOL Comedy Club in Midtown Manhattan, also frequenting open-mics at various comedy clubs around the city. In 2018, she appeared on Just for Laughs's New Faces list, and was featured in the Amazon Prime Video television series Inside Jokes, which showed her journey to the New Faces festival.

In March 2020, at the beginning of the COVID-19 pandemic, she began hosting Find Your Beach, a biweekly podcast hosted alongside her husband, fellow comedian Andy Haynes. Baker's debut comedy special, Whiskey Fists, was produced by All Things Comedy and premiered on Comedy Central's YouTube channel in August 2021, while an album of the special was released through 800 Pound Gorilla Records. Also in 2021, Baker became a writer for the HBO Max sketch comedy television series That Damn Michael Che, which earned her nominations for the Writers Guild of America Award for Best Comedy/Variety Sketch Series and the Black Reel Award for Outstanding Writing in a Comedy Series for the episode "Policin'".

Baker became a writer for Saturday Night Live during its 47th season in February 2022, and appeared in a recurring role on Hulu's comedy-drama series Life & Beth in March 2022. She also appeared in the Roku Channel's Will Smith-helmed series This Joka in 2022. As of 2022, Baker hosts Devil's Advocate, an All Things Comedy podcast.

In April 2024, Baker launched her comedy tour, The Kidding Around Tour. Her second comedy special, The Mother Lode, was released on Netflix in February 2025. She filmed half of it when she was 8 months pregnant and the other half one year after she had given birth to her daughter in October 2023. At the start of SNL's 50th season, Baker (who had already been writing on the show for a few years), was named as a writer of its Weekend Update segment. After three years with the show, Baker announced her departure from the Saturday Night Live writing team in August 2025.

== Comedic style ==
Baker's comedy has been described as dark comedy, and many of her jokes revolve around personal stories or anecdotes, such as the death of her sister or her domestic abuse at the hands of her alcoholic ex-boyfriend. Her jokes are often satirical and have twists. Baker learned how to write jokes after watching comedy specials by Dave Attell, Amy Schumer, Dave Chappelle, and others, and transcribing the jokes to find the set up and the punchline.
