= Amber Ruffin =

American comedian, writer, and actress

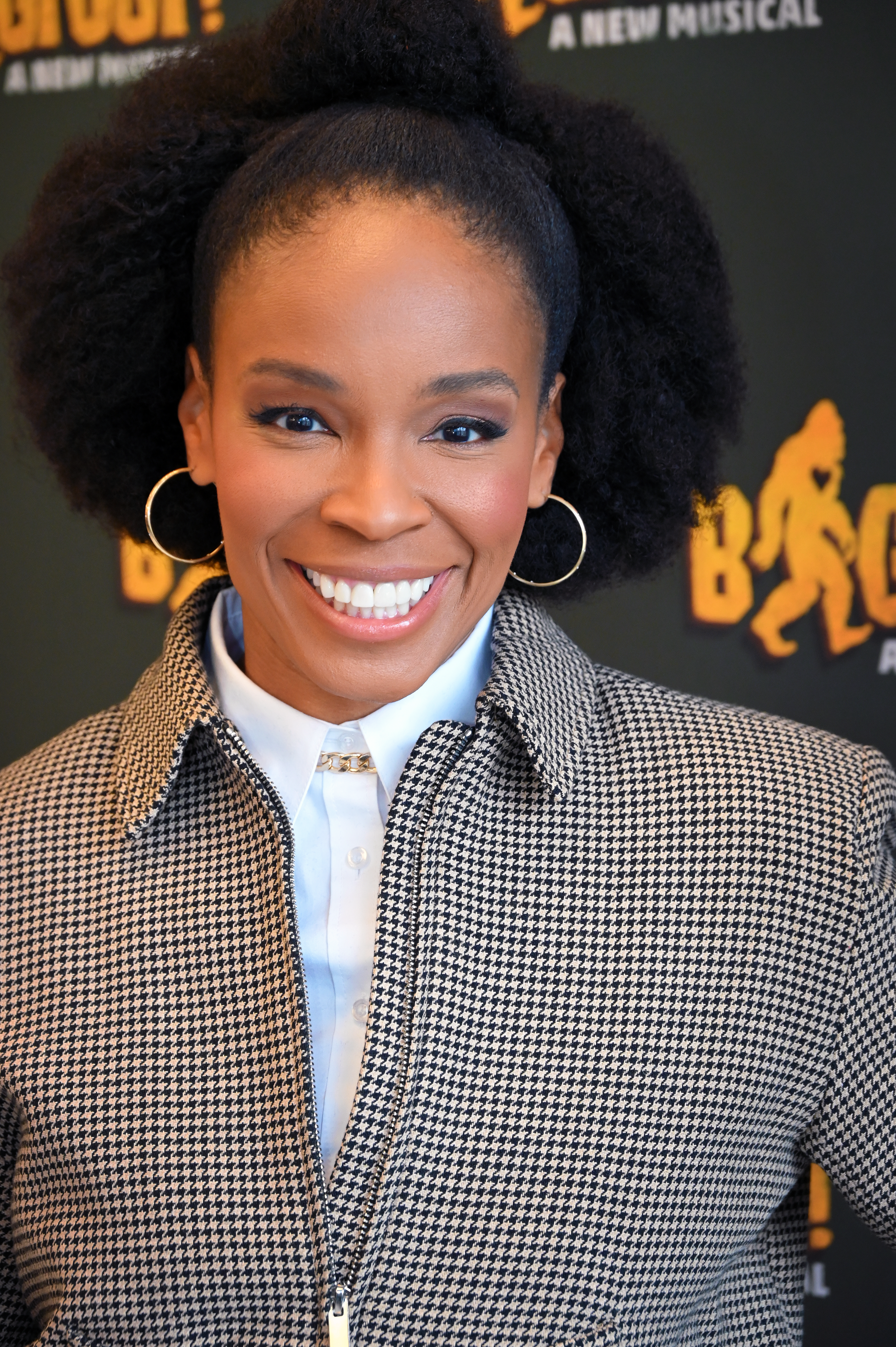
- Ruffin in 2026
- Born: Amber Mildred Ruffin; January 9, 1979 (age 47); Omaha, Nebraska, U.S.
- Occupations: Host; comedian; writer; actress; author; playwright
- Years active: 2001–present
- Spouse: Jan Schiltmeijer (m. 2010; div. 2023)

Amber Mildred Ruffin (born January 9, 1979) is an American comedian, writer and actress. She hosted her own late-night talk show titled The Amber Ruffin Show on Peacock from 2020 to 2022. She has been a writer for Late Night with Seth Meyers since 2014. When she joined Meyers' show, she became the first Black woman to write for a late-night network talk show in the United States.

In January 2021, she co-authored a book with her sister Lacey Lamar titled You'll Never Believe What Happened to Lacey: Crazy Stories about Racism, which made the New York Times Best Seller list. They released a second book, The World Record Book of Racist Stories, in 2022. In 2022, Ruffin and her writing partner Jenny Hagel co-founded their production company Straight to Cards under their overall deal with Universal Television.

== Early life and education ==
Ruffin was born in Omaha, Nebraska, to Theresa and James Ruffin. She is the youngest of five children. As a child, she learned Signing Exact English to communicate with a deaf neighbor. Ruffin graduated from Benson High School in 1996.

== Career ==
In 2001, Ruffin began performing in local theater productions and improv in Omaha. While performing with her improv troupe at an event in Chicago, Ruffin met comedian and owner of iO Theater Charna Halpern. Halpern encouraged Ruffin to move to Chicago saying she believed Ruffin would "have a full-time job, doing comedy, within the year". In 2008 after finishing her classes at iO, Ruffin moved to Amsterdam to work as a writer and performer on the improv comedy troupe Boom Chicago Amsterdam.

After returning to the United States, Ruffin performed as part of The Second City in both Denver and Chicago, where she first met future Late Night co-writer Jenny Hagel. In 2011, she moved to Los Angeles; joined the YouTube comedy group RobotDown featuring Jessica Lowe, Carlo Corbellini, and Davey Vorhes; and appeared on an episode of Key & Peele. She also joined the nationally recognized sketch and musical comedy troupe Story Pirates, where she performed sketches based on stories written by kids. Ruffin was also a member of Sacred Fools Theater Company performing a serialized version of King of Kong: A Musical Parody, a two-woman show parodying the documentary The King of Kong. The musical was co-written with co-star Lauren Van Kurin and directed by fellow Boom Chicago alum Brendan Hunt, with music by David Schmoll. King of Kong appeared at the 2014 New York International Fringe Festival winning Best Overall Musical 2014, and the 2015 Hollywood Fringe Festival (with Hunt subbing for an unavailable Ruffin), where it won Best Musical & Outstanding Songwriting. The show returned to Sacred Fools in September 2016 for a performance attended by parody target Billy Mitchell himself.

In 2013, Saturday Night Live received backlash for not having any Black women on the cast. Ruffin auditioned for the show in 2014 alongside Tiffany Haddish, Leslie Jones, Gabrielle Dennis, Nicole Byer, Simone Shepherd, and Bresha Webb. Ruffin was unsuccessful in her audition. A few days later Seth Meyers called to ask her to be a writer on his new late night show. Ruffin has been a writer on Late Night with Seth Meyers since the show's start in 2014. In addition to writing she also appears in several recurring segments on the program including: "Amber Says What?", "Amber's Minute of Fury", "Jokes Seth Can't Tell" (with fellow writer Jenny Hagel), and "Point, Counterpoint". When the George Floyd protests began, Ruffin opened a week's worth of shows by retelling her experiences with police officers and police brutality. Meyers interviewed Ruffin as a guest for the show's 1,000th episode.

When not writing for Late Night, Ruffin wrote for the Comedy Central show Detroiters and was a regular narrator on the Comedy Central show Drunk History. In 2017, Ruffin developed a single-camera comedy show, Going Dutch, but the series was not ordered. She was nominated for a Writers Guild of America award in the category "Comedy/Variety (Including Talk) Series" in 2017.

In February 2018, Ruffin hosted the 70th Writers Guild of America awards ceremony.

In 2019, NBC ordered a pilot presentation for Ruffin's single-camera comedy series Village Gazette. In the same year Ruffin was a writer for the first season of A Black Lady Sketch Show on HBO.

On September 25, 2020, Ruffin's late-night talk show, The Amber Ruffin Show, premiered on NBC's streaming service Peacock. The show broke away from the typical late night structure, foregoing guests and focusing instead on topical sketches. The show was nominated for a Writers Guild of America award in the category "Comedy/Variety Sketch Series" in 2021. The show was also nominated for Outstanding Writing for a Variety Series at the 73rd Primetime Emmy Awards.

Ruffin and her sister Lacey Lamar co-authored a book, titled You'll Never Believe What Happened to Lacey: Crazy Stories about Racism, which was released on January 12, 2021, and appeared on the New York Times Best Seller list.

In February 2021, it was announced that Ruffin was set to co-write the Broadway-bound musical adaptation of Some Like It Hot alongside Matthew Lopez. She received a Tony Award for Best Book of a Musical nomination for the show.

In September 2022, it was revealed that Ruffin would be the voice actor of Purple, the new spokescandy for M&M's.

In February 2025, the White House Correspondents' Association (WHCA) board announced that Ruffin would be the featured entertainment for the White House Correspondents' Dinner on April 26. On March 29, WHCA board president Eugene Daniels announced that the board had decided to cancel her performance, "to ensure the focus is not on the politics of division". Ruffin's planned appearance had been criticized by White House deputy chief of staff Taylor Budowich, who labeled the WHCA's cancellation of Ruffin's performance as a "cop-out" and described her as "hate-filled". Commenting on her cancellation, Ruffin said, "I thought when people take away your rights, erase your history and deport your friends, you’re supposed to call it out. But I was wrong."

Bigfoot! The Musical is a musical comedy with lyrics by Ruffin, music by David Schmoll, and a book by Ruffin and Kevin Sciretta. The Off-Broadway production began previews on February 11, 2026, at New York City Center.

== Personal life ==
Ruffin was married to Dutch artist Jan Schiltmeijer from 2010 until their divorce in 2023. On the last day of 2024's Pride Month, she came out as queer on Instagram showing a photo of herself wearing a shirt saying "QUEER." During an appearance on Beat Bobby Flay on July 28, 2026, she stated that she is gay.

== Filmography ==
=== Television ===
Year	Title	Role	Notes
2010	Ox Tales	(voice)	2nd English dub
2012	RobotDown	Various	Also producer, writer
2012	Key & Peele	Party Wife	Episode #2.9
2012–2013	Animation Domination High-Def	Various, Misty (voice)	3 episodes
2014	Wish It Inc.	Shari	12 episodes
2014	66th Primetime Emmy Awards		TV special; writer
2014–present	Late Night with Seth Meyers	Herself / various	Also writer (550+ episodes)
2015	Above Average Presents	Nurse	Episode: "Unique Hospital: The Surgery Results"
2017–2018	Detroiters	Molly	2 episodes; also writer
2018	75th Golden Globe Awards		TV special; writer
2019	Tuca & Bertie	Dakota (voice)	Episode: "The New Bird"
2019	Drunk History	Barbara Cooke	Episode: "Legacies"
2019	You're Not a Monster	Mermaid / Gremlin (voice)	2 episodes
2019	76th Golden Globe Awards		TV special; writer
2019	A Black Lady Sketch Show		Writer (6 episodes)
2020	Village Gazette	Amber	Also executive producer and writer
2020–2023	The Amber Ruffin Show	Host	Also writer
2021–2022	Central Park	Shauna / Sha-Boom (voice)	5 episodes
2022	Would I Lie to You? (US)	Herself	Episode: "Babysitting Lemurs"
2022	Girls5eva	T.K.	Episode: "Leave a Message If You Love Me"
2022	Big Mouth	Auntie Amber (voice)	Episode: "Asexual Healing"
2022	Gutsy	Herself	2 episodes
2024	Last Week Tonight with John Oliver	Mom	Episode: "Medicaid"
2024–present	Have I Got News For You	Herself	Panelist, Team Captain

=== Podcasts ===
Year	Title	Role	Notes
2020	Escape from Virtual Island	Faith (voice)	Audio comedy, 11 episodes

== Awards and nominations ==
Year	Award	Category	Work	Result
2016	Writers Guild of America Award	Comedy-Variety Talk Series	Late Night with Seth Meyers	Nominated
2017	Writers Guild of America Award	Comedy-Variety Talk Series	Late Night with Seth Meyers	Nominated
2018	Writers Guild of America Award	Comedy-Variety Talk Series	Late Night with Seth Meyers	Nominated
2019	Writers Guild of America Award	Comedy-Variety Talk Series	Late Night with Seth Meyers	Nominated
2020	Writers Guild of America Award	Comedy-Variety Talk Series	Late Night with Seth Meyers	Nominated
2021	Primetime Emmy Awards	Outstanding Writing for a Variety Series	The Amber Ruffin Show	Nominated
2021	Television Critics Association Awards	Outstanding Achievement in Sketch/Variety Shows	The Amber Ruffin Show	Nominated
2022	Writers Guild of America Award	Comedy-Variety Talk Series	Late Night with Seth Meyers	Nominated
2022	Black Reel Award for Television	Outstanding Variety, Talk or Sketch – Series or Special	The Amber Ruffin Show	Nominated
2022	Critics' Choice Television Awards	Best Talk Show	The Amber Ruffin Show	Nominated
2022	Dorian Awards	Best Current Affairs Program	The Amber Ruffin Show	Nominated
2022	GLAAD Media Awards	Outstanding Variety or Talk Show Episode	The Amber Ruffin Show	Nominated
2022	Hollywood Critics Association TV Awards	Best Streaming Variety Sketch Series, Talk Series, or Special	The Amber Ruffin Show	Nominated
2022	NAACP Image Awards	Outstanding Host in a Reality, Game Show or Variety (Series or Special)	The Amber Ruffin Show	Nominated
2022	Television Critics Association Awards	Outstanding Achievement in Variety, Talk or Sketch	The Amber Ruffin Show	Nominated
2023	Writers Guild of America Award	Comedy-Variety Talk Series	Late Night with Seth Meyers	Nominated
2023	Tony Award	Best Book of a Musical	Some Like It Hot	Nominated
2023	Drama Desk Award	Outstanding Book of a Musical	Some Like It Hot	Won
2023	Outer Critics Circle Award	Outstanding Book of a Musical	Some Like It Hot	Nominated
2023	Drama League Award	Outstanding Production of a Musical	Some Like It Hot	Nominated
2026	Drama League Award	Outstanding Production of a Musical	Bigfoot! The Musical	Pending

== Bibliography ==
- Ruffin, Amber; Lamar, Lacey (January 12, 2021). You'll Never Believe What Happened to Lacey: Crazy Stories about Racism. Grand Central Publishing. ISBN 978-1-5387-1934-3.
- Ruffin, Amber; Lamar, Lacey (November 22, 2022). The World Record Book of Racist Stories. Grand Central Publishing. ISBN 9781538724576.

== Honors ==
- 2018: Crain's New York Business, 40 Under 40
- 2021: New York Times Best Seller, Hardcover Nonfiction
- 2021: Time100 Next

== See also ==
- New Yorkers in journalism
