= Jenny Hagel =

American comedian and comedy writer

- Born: Jennifer Hagel; 1976 (age 49–50)
- Education: College of William & Mary (BA); Northwestern University School of Communication (MFA)
- Occupations: Writer; comedian
- Known for: Late Night with Seth Meyers; The Amber Ruffin Show
- Children: 1

Jenny Hagel (born 1976 or 1977) is an American comedian and writer. She is a writer and performer for Late Night with Seth Meyers, known for appearing in the recurring segment "Jokes Seth Can't Tell", along with host Seth Meyers and Amber Ruffin, a fellow writer-performer. Hagel served as an executive producer and head writer on The Amber Ruffin Show on Peacock. In 2022, Hagel and Ruffin co-founded a production company, Straight to Cards, under their overall deal with Universal Television.

== Career ==
Hagel graduated from the College of William & Mary in Williamsburg, Virginia. She then received a MFA degree in Writing for the Screen and Stage from the Northwestern University School of Communication at Northwestern in Evanston, Illinois, in 2009. David E. Tolchinsky was one of her professors there. She performed improv and sketch comedy at The Second City in Chicago for five years before moving to Manhattan, New York.

In addition to Late Night with Seth Meyers, she has written for multiple other comedy TV shows, including Impractical Jokers, the Big Gay Sketch Show, and the MTV show 10 on Top. She was formerly the head writer for 10 on Top. In 2020, she became the inaugural head writer for The Amber Ruffin Show on Peacock. In 2022, she was nominated for a GLAAD Award for work addressing LGBTQ issues on the Late Night show.

Hagel's debut book, Advice No One Asked For: Essays, was published in June 2026, partly inspired by her live comedy show, "Jenny Hagel Gives Advice".

== Personal life ==
Hagel is the daughter of Virginia and Judge Lawrence B. Hagel, who was appointed to the United States Court of Appeals by President George W. Bush in 2003. She is of white and Puerto Rican descent on her mother’s side. She lives in Brooklyn with her son. She is divorced after a marriage to Jennifer Vanasco in 2012.

== Filmography ==
- 2008: Human Potential (Short) – Writer, actress
- 2008: Crafty (Short) – Writer, actress
- 2009: Tech Support (Short) – Writer, actress
- 2010: Feminist Rapper (Short) – Director, writer, actress
- 2010: The Big Gay Sketch Show (TV Series) – Writer (1 Episode)
- 2010: Positive Comment (Short) – Director, writer, actress
- 2010: 10 on Top (TV Series) – Writer (3 Episodes)
- 2010: Nice Shirt (Short) – Writer, producer, actress
- 2013: Impractical Jokers (TV Series) – Comedy producer
- 2016–present: Late Night with Seth Meyers (TV Series) – written by (175+ episodes), Performer
- 2018: White Guy Talk Show (TV Series) – Writer (39 Episodes)
- 2018: 75th Golden Globe Awards (TV Special) – Writer
- 2019: 76th Golden Globe Awards (TV Special) – Writer
- 2020: Peacock Presents: The At-Home Variety Show Featuring Seth MacFarlane (TV Series Short) – Written by (2 Episodes)
- 2020: The Amber Ruffin Show - Head writer
