= Vailathur =

- town
- Location in Kerala, India Vailathur (India)
- Coordinates: 10°57′0″N 75°56′45″E
- Country: India
- State: Kerala
- District: Malappuram

Languages
  - Official: Malayalam
- Time zone: UTC+5:30 (IST)
- PIN: 676106
- Telephone code: 0494_258****
- Vehicle registration: KL-10, KL-55
- Nearest city: Tirur
- Lok Sabha constituency: Ponnani
- Climate: Tropical monsoon (Köppen)
- Avg. summer temperature: 35 °C (95 °F)
- Avg. winter temperature: 20 °C (68 °F)

Vailathur is a town 4 km from Tirur on the way to Malappuram and it is a junction turning to Valancheri and Malappuram. It also has a road to Tanur in the west side. Vailathur is a ward of Tanur Block Panchayat.

== Location ==
The Thanur road is an easy way to Chemmad as well, which goes through Ittilakkal (via ayyaya road) (Diverting place. The straight road leads to Thanoor and the right turning road leads to Chemmad), Vellachal, Churangara, Pulparamba, Theyyala, Pandimuttam, Velliyampuram, Kodinji and Chemmad. Buses are available through this route. Vellachal, Churangara, Ittilakkal, Thalakkadathur, Kadungathukund, Kuttippala, Karingappara, Tanalur are some nearby small towns.

== Transportation ==
Vaiathur village connects to other parts of India through Tirur town. National highway No.66 passes through Tirur and the northern stretch connects to Goa and Mumbai. The southern stretch connects to Cochin and Trivandrum. Highway No.966 goes to Palakkad and Coimbatore.

- Railway station: Tirur railway station is one of the major railway stations in the Malabar region. Almost every train stops here, connecting the Malappuram district to the rest of the country.
- Nearest airport: Calicut International Airport is approximately 45 kilometres away.
- Nearest towns: Tirur, Kottakkal

== Major institutions ==
1. AMLP School Athanikkal, Vailathur
2. SC English School, Vailathur
3. Thibyan Pre-School, Vailathur
4. AMLP school, Ittilakkal

== Masjid and temple ==
1. Juma Masjid, Athanikkal-Theyyala road, Chilavil
2. Town Juma Masjid, Vailathur
3. Masjid Al Falah, (In down town)
4. Masjid Usman bin Affan, Kavanatuchola
5. Kavanatuchola Devi Temble, Naurseripadi
6. Mahadeva Temple, Chilavil
