= Twin city =

Twin city or twin town may refer to:

== Definitions ==
- Twin cities, two towns or cities that are geographically close to each other, and often referred to collectively
- Sister cities, distant cities or towns that agree to partner each other, for various reasons

== Geography ==
- Little Rock-North Little Rock, in the U.S. state of Arkansas
- Minneapolis–Saint Paul in the U.S. state of Minnesota, most commonly referred to as the Twin Cities
- Dallas-Fort Worth, in the U.S. state of Texas
- Ballybofey and Stranorlar, in the Irish county of Donegal, often called the Twin Towns
- Champaign–Urbana, in the U.S. state of Illinois, often called the Twin Cities
- Lewiston–Auburn, in the U.S. state of Maine, often called the Twin Cities
- Trinidad and Tobago, in the Caribbean
- Twin City, Georgia, a city
- Twin Town, Wisconsin, an unincorporated community
- Winston-Salem, North Carolina, nicknamed The Twin City

== Other uses ==
- Twin City (Bratislava), the biggest multifunction building complex in Central Europe, under construction
- Twin Town, a 1997 comedy film

== See also ==
- Cândido Godói, a town in Brazil known for its unusually high twin population
- Towns of twins, a list of cities with exceptionally high twin birth rates
- Twin Cities (disambiguation)
- Twin Township (disambiguation)
- Twinsburg, Ohio, location of an annual twin convention
- Sister city (disambiguation)
