= Populated places with highest incidence of multiple birth =

This article lists places worldwide where relatively high birth rates of twins have been documented.

== Villages and towns ==
| Location | Country | Continent | Twin Birth Rate |
|---|---|---|---|
| Kodinhi | India | Asia | 204 sets of twins and 2 sets of triplets born to 2,000 families |
| Velyka Kopanya | Ukraine | Europe | 122 twins in a population of 4,000 |
| Igbo-Ora | Nigeria | Africa | 45 to 50 sets of twins per 1000 live births |
| Doddi Gunta | India | Asia | 90 sets of twins and 2 sets of triplets born to 3,000 families |
| Cândido Godói | Brazil | South America | One in 10 births involves twins |
| Mohammadpur Umri | India | Asia | One in 10 births involves twins |
| Abu Atwa, Ismailia | Egypt | Africa | |

== States ==
In 2008, Massachusetts has emerged as the most prolific producer of multiple births in the United States. The state has a twin birth rate of 4.5 for every 100 live births, compared with a national rate of 3.2.

== See also ==
- Category:Populated places with highest incidence of multiple birth
