= Twin =

One of two offspring produced by the same pregnancy

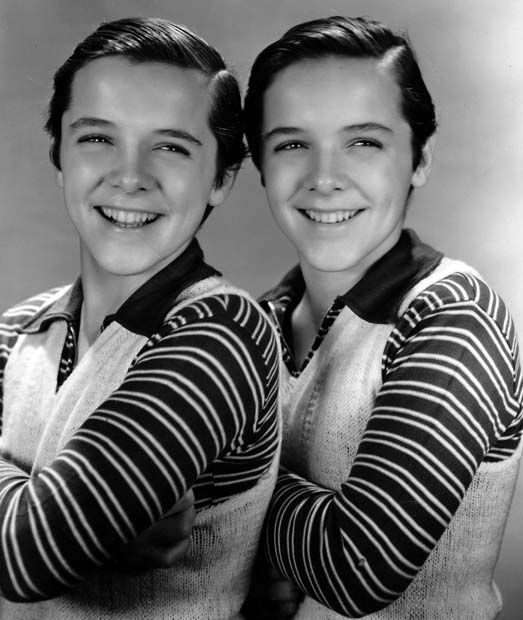
Identical twins can be difficult to visually distinguish especially when young, as demonstrated by brothers Billy and Bobby Mauch.

Twins are two offspring produced by the same pregnancy. Twins can be either monozygotic ('identical'), meaning that they develop from one zygote, which splits and forms two embryos, or dizygotic ('non-identical' or 'fraternal'), meaning that each twin develops from a separate egg and each egg is fertilized by a separate sperm cell. Since identical twins develop from one zygote, they will share the same chromosomal sex, while fraternal twins may or may not. In very rare cases, fraternal or (semi-) identical twins can have the same mother and different fathers.

In contrast, a fetus that develops alone in the womb (the much more common case in humans) is a singleton; one of a multiple birth is a multiple. Unrelated look-alikes whose resemblance parallels that of twins are referred to as doppelgänger.

== Statistics ==
Percentage of twin births by country and by year.

The human twin birth rate in the United States rose 76% from 1980 through 2009, from 9.4 to 16.7 twin sets (18.8 to 33.3 twins) per 1,000 births. The Yoruba people have the highest rate of twinning in the world, at 45–50 twin sets (90–100 twins) per 1,000 live births, possibly because of high consumption of a specific type of yam containing a natural phytoestrogen which may stimulate the ovaries to release an egg from each side. In Central Africa, there are 18–30 twin sets (or 36–60 twins) per 1,000 live births. In South America, South Asia, and Southeast Asia, the lowest rates are found: only six to nine twin sets per thousand live births. North America and Europe have intermediate rates of nine to sixteen twin sets per thousand live births. In the United Kingdom, approximately one in 65 pregnancies results in a multiple birth. There has been an upward trend in the number of multiple births, which is attributed to various factors including fertility treatments, the survival rates of premature babies and women delaying starting their families.

Multiple pregnancies are much less likely to carry to full term than single births, with twin pregnancies lasting on average 37 weeks, three weeks less than full term. Women who have a family history of fraternal twins have a higher chance of producing fraternal twins themselves, as there is a genetically linked tendency to hyper-ovulate. There is no known genetic link for identical twinning. Other factors that increase the odds of having fraternal twins include maternal age, fertility drugs and other fertility treatments, nutrition, and prior births. Some women intentionally turn to fertility drugs in order to conceive twins.\

=== Dizygotic (fraternal) twins ===
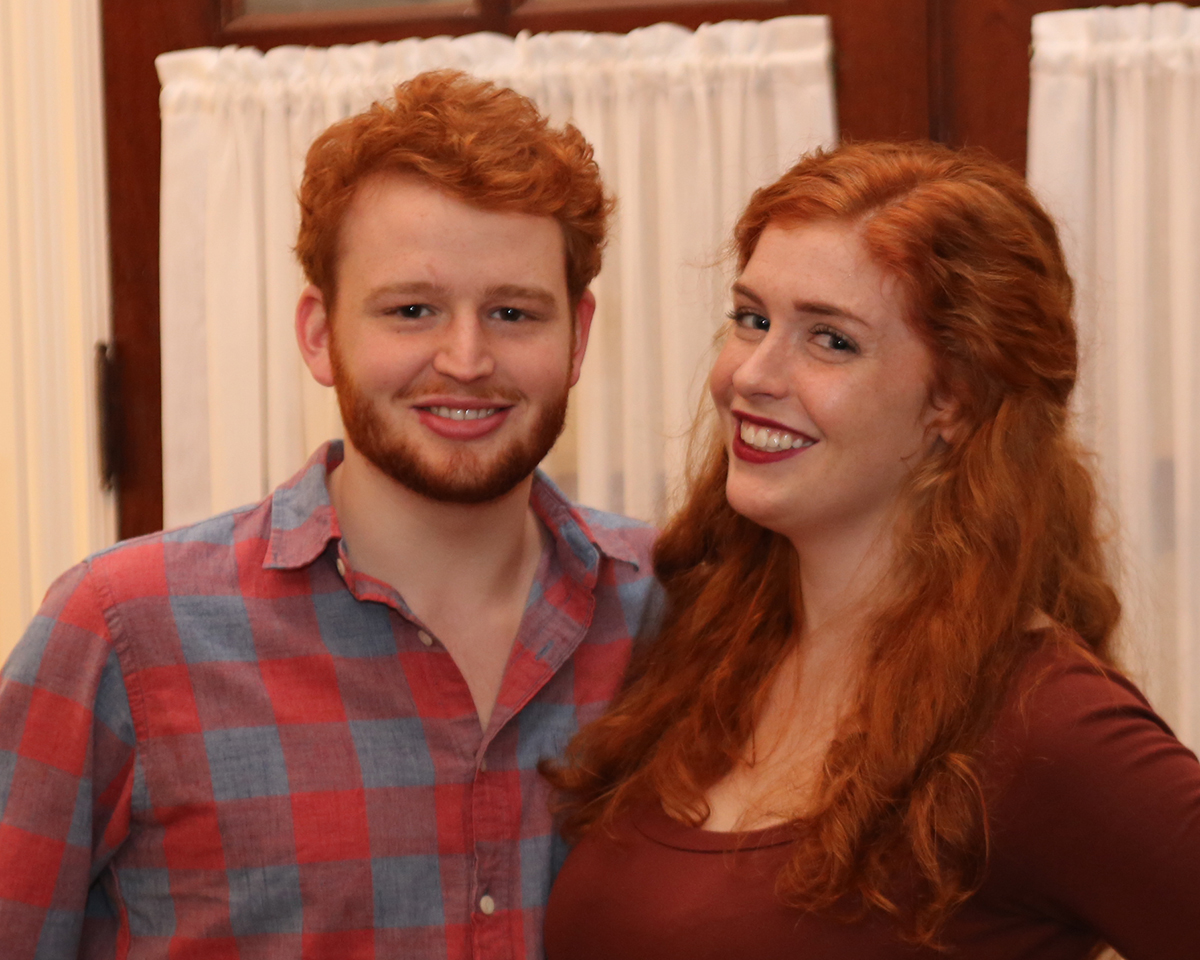
Adult fraternal twins

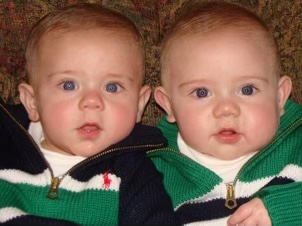
Fraternal twin brothers as babies

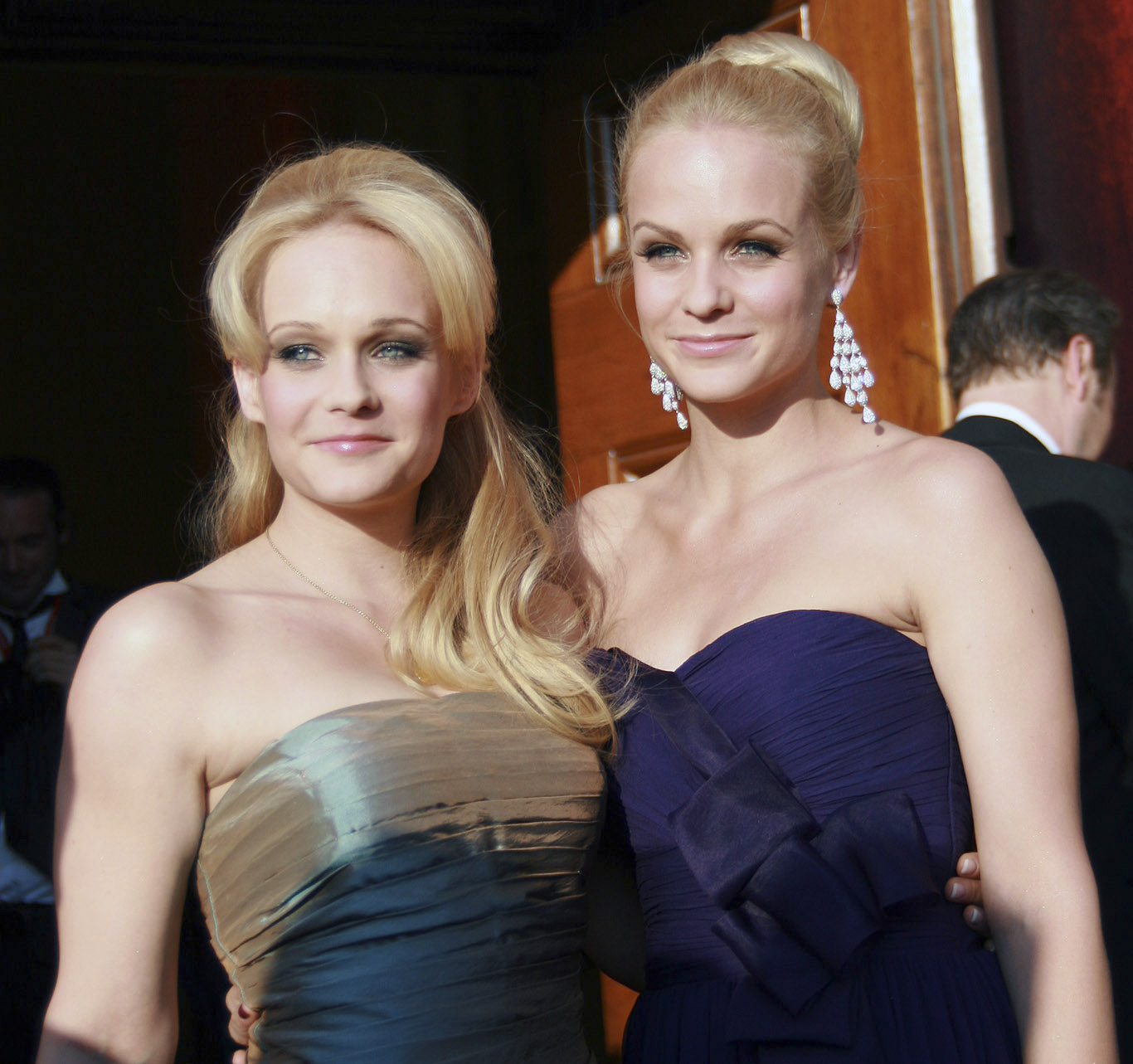
Austrian TV host Mirjam Weichselbraun (right) and her fraternal twin Melanie look very similar but with a significant difference in height.

Dizygotic (DZ) or fraternal twins (also referred to as non-identical twins, dissimilar twins, biovular twins, and, informally in the case of females, sororal twins) usually occur when two fertilized eggs are implanted in the uterus wall at the same time. When two eggs are independently fertilized by two different sperm cells, fraternal twins result. The two eggs, or ova, form two zygotes, hence the terms dizygotic and biovular. Fraternal twins are, essentially, two ordinary siblings who happen to develop in the womb together and who are born at the same time, since they arise from two separate eggs fertilized by two separate sperm, just like ordinary siblings. This is the most common type of twin.

Dizygotic twins, like any other siblings, will practically always have different sequences on each chromosome, due to chromosomal crossover during meiosis. Dizygotic twins share on average 50 percent of each other's genes, the same as siblings that are conceived and born at different times. Like any other siblings, dizygotic twins may look similar, particularly as they are the same age. However, dizygotic twins may also look very different from each other (for example, be of opposite sexes).

Studies show that there is a genetic proclivity for dizygotic twinning. However, it is only the mother who has any effect on the chances of having such twins; there is no known mechanism for a father to cause the release of more than one ovum. Dizygotic twinning ranges from six per thousand births in Japan (similar to the rate of monozygotic twins) to 14 and more per thousand in some African countries.

Dizygotic twins are also more common for older mothers, with twinning rates doubling in mothers over the age of 35. With the advent of technologies and techniques to assist women in getting pregnant, the rate of fraternals has increased markedly.

=== Monozygotic (identical) twins ===
Monozygotic (MZ) or identical twins occur when a single egg is fertilized to form one zygote (hence, monozygotic) which then divides into two separate embryos.

==== Mechanism ====
Regarding spontaneous or natural monozygotic twinning, a 2007 theory related to in vitro fertilization (IVF) proposes that monozygotic twins may be formed when a blastocyst contains two inner cell masses (ICM), each of which will lead to a separate fetus, rather than by the embryo splitting while hatching from the zona pellucida (the gelatinous protective coating around the blastocyst).

Monozygotic twins may also be created artificially by embryo splitting. It can be used as an expansion of in vitro fertilization (IVF) to increase the number of available embryos for embryo transfer.

==== Incidence ====
The chance of identical twins is approximately 3 to 4 in every 1,000 births. The likelihood of a single fertilization resulting in monozygotic twins is uniformly distributed in all populations around the world.

This is in marked contrast to dizygotic twinning, which ranges from about six per thousand births in Japan (almost similar to the rate of identical twins, which is around 4–5) to 15 and more per thousand in some parts of India and up to over 20 in some Central African countries. The exact cause for the splitting of a zygote or embryo is unknown.

IVF techniques are more likely to create dizygotic twins. For IVF deliveries, there are nearly 21 pairs of twins for every 1,000.

==== Genetic and epigenetic similarity ====
Comparison of zygote development in monozygotic and dizygotic twins. In the uterus, a majority of monozygotic twins (60–70%) share the same placenta but have separate amniotic sacs. In 18–30% of monozygotic twins each fetus has a separate placenta and a separate amniotic sac. A small number (1–2%) of monozygotic twins share the same placenta and amniotic sac. Fraternal twins each have their own placenta and own amniotic sac.

Monozygotic twins are genetically nearly identical and they are the same chromosomal sex unless there has been a mutation during development. The children of monozygotic twins test genetically as half-siblings (or full siblings, if a pair of monozygotic twins reproduces with another pair or with the same person), rather than first cousins. Identical twins do not have the same fingerprints however, because even within the confines of the womb, the fetuses touch different parts of their environment, giving rise to small variations in their corresponding prints and thus making them unique.

Monozygotic twins can have rare differences in their genotypes, normally due to an environmental factor or the deactivation of different X chromosomes in female monozygotic twins. In some extremely rare cases, due to aneuploidy, twins may express different sexual phenotypes, typically from an XXY Klinefelter syndrome zygote splitting unevenly.

To quantify the occurrence of such genotypic differences, a 2013 study of DNA in white blood cells of 66 pairs of monozygotic twins tested for 506,786 single-nucleotide polymorphisms known to occur in human populations. Polymorphisms appeared in 2 of the 33 million comparisons, leading the researchers to extrapolate that the blood cells of monozygotic twins may have on the order of one DNA-sequence difference for every 12 million nucleotides, which would imply hundreds of differences across the entire genome. The mutations producing the differences detected in this study would have occurred during embryonic cell-division (after the point of fertilization). If they occur early in fetal development, they will be present in a very large proportion of body cells.

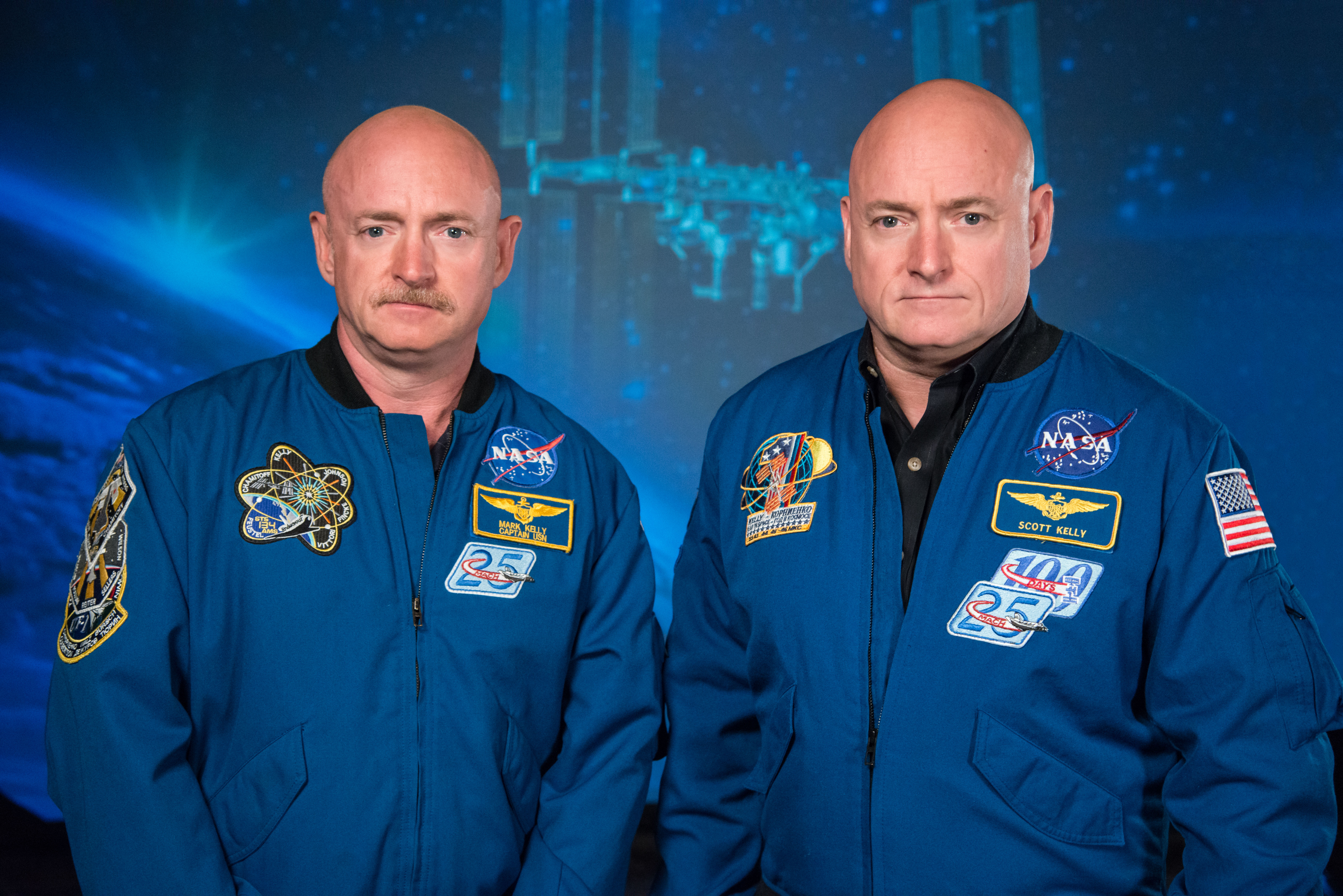
Despite being genetically identical, twins Mark and Scott Kelly are distinguishable from each other.

Another cause of difference between monozygotic twins is epigenetic modification, caused by differing environmental influences throughout their lives. Epigenetics refers to the level of activity of any particular gene. A gene may become switched on, switched off, or could become partially switched on or off in an individual. This epigenetic modification is triggered by environmental events. Monozygotic twins can have markedly different epigenetic profiles. A study of 80 pairs of monozygotic twins ranging in age from three to 74 showed that the youngest twins have relatively few epigenetic differences. The number of epigenetic differences increases with age. Fifty-year-old twins had over three times the epigenetic difference of three-year-old twins. Twins who had spent their lives apart (such as those adopted by two different sets of parents at birth) had the greatest difference. However, certain characteristics become more alike as twins age, such as IQ and personality.

A four-year study of monozygotic twins and their extended families, published in Nature Genetics in 2021, found that these twins have genetic differences that begin in the early stages of embryonic development.

=== Polar body and semi-identical twins ===
A 1981 study of a deceased XXX twin fetus without a heart showed that although its fetal development suggested that it was an identical twin, as it shared a placenta with its healthy twin, tests revealed that it was probably a polar body twin. The authors were unable to predict whether a healthy fetus could result from a polar body twinning. However, a study in 2012 found that it is possible for a polar body to result in a healthy fetus.

In 2003, a study argued that many cases of triploidy arise from sesquizygotic (semi-identical) twinning which happens when a single egg is fertilized by two sperm and splits the three sets of chromosomes into two separate cell sets.

== Degree of separation ==
Various types of chorionicity and amniosity (how the fetus' sac looks) in monozygotic (identical) twins as a result of when the fertilized egg divides

The degree of separation of the twins in utero depends on if and when they split into two zygotes. Dizygotic twins were always two zygotes. Monozygotic twins split into two zygotes at some time very early in the pregnancy. The timing of this separation determines the chorionicity (the number of placentae) and amniocity (the number of sacs) of the pregnancy. Dichorionic twins either never divided (i.e.: were dizygotic) or they divided within the first four days. Monoamnionic twins divide after the first week.

In very rare cases, twins become conjoined twins. Non-conjoined monozygotic twins form up to day 14 of embryonic development, but when twinning occurs after 14 days, the twins will likely be conjoined. Furthermore, there can be various degrees of shared environment of twins in the womb, potentially leading to pregnancy complications.

It is a common misconception that two placentas automatically implies dizygotic twins, but if monozygotic twins separate early enough, the arrangement of sacs and placentas in utero is in fact indistinguishable from that of dizygotic twins.

Type	Description	Day
Dichorionic–diamniotic	Normally, twins have two separate (di- being a numerical prefix for two) chorions and amniotic sacs, termed dichorionic–diamniotic or DiDi. It occurs in almost all cases of dizygotic twins (except in very rare cases of fusion between their blastocysts) and in 18–36% (or around 25%) of monozygotic (identical) twins. DiDi twins have the lowest mortality risk at about nine percent, although that is still significantly higher than that of singletons.	Dichorionic–diamniotic twins form when splitting takes place by the third day after fertilisation.
Monochorionic–diamniotic	Monochorionic twins share the same placenta. Monochorionic twins generally have two amniotic sacs (called monochorionic–diamniotic MoDi), which occurs in 60–70% of the pregnancies with monozygotic twins, and in 0.3% of all pregnancies. Monochorionic–diamniotic twins are almost always monozygotic, with a few exceptions where the blastocysts have fused. Monochorionic twins share the same placenta, and thus have a risk of twin-to-twin transfusion syndrome.	Days 4–8
Monochorionic–monoamniotic	Monochorionic twins share the same amnion in 1–2% of monozygotic twin pregnancies. Monoamniotic twins are always monozygotic. The survival rate for monoamniotic twins is somewhere between 50% and 60%. Monoamniotic twins, as with diamniotic monochorionic twins, have a risk of twin-to-twin transfusion syndrome. Also, the two umbilical cords have an increased chance of being tangled around the babies. Because of this, there is an increased chance that the newborns may be miscarried or develop cerebral palsy due to lack of oxygen.	Monoamniotic twins occur when the split takes place after the ninth day after fertilization.
Conjoined twins	When the division of the developing zygote into two embryos occurs, 99% of the time it is within eight days of fertilization. Mortality is highest for conjoined twins due to the many complications resulting from shared organs.	If the division of the zygote occurs later than the 12 days then conjoined twins are usually the result.

Dichorionic–diamniotic twins at eight weeks and five days since co-incubation as part of IVF. The twin at left in the image is shown in the sagittal plane with the head pointing towards upper left. The twin at right in the image is shown in the coronal plane with the head pointing rightwards.

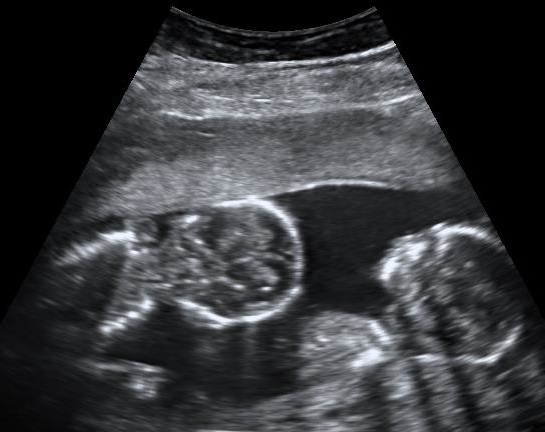
Abdominal ultrasonography of monoamniotic twins at a gestational age of 15 weeks. There is no sign of any membrane between the fetuses. A coronal plane is shown of the twin at left, and a sagittal plane of parts of the upper thorax and head is shown of the twin at right.

== Demographics ==
A 2006 study has found that insulin-like growth factor present in dairy products may increase the chance of dizygotic twinning. Specifically, the study found that vegan mothers (who exclude dairy from their diets) are one-fifth as likely to have twins as vegetarian or omnivore mothers, and concluded that "Genotypes favoring elevated IGF and diets including dairy products, especially in areas where growth hormone is given to cattle, appear to enhance the chances of multiple pregnancies due to ovarian stimulation."

From 1980 to 1997, the number of twin births in the United States rose 52%. This rise can at least partly be attributed to the increasing popularity of fertility drugs and procedures such as IVF, which result in multiple births more frequently than unassisted fertilizations do. It may also be linked to the increase of growth hormones in food.

=== Ethnicity ===
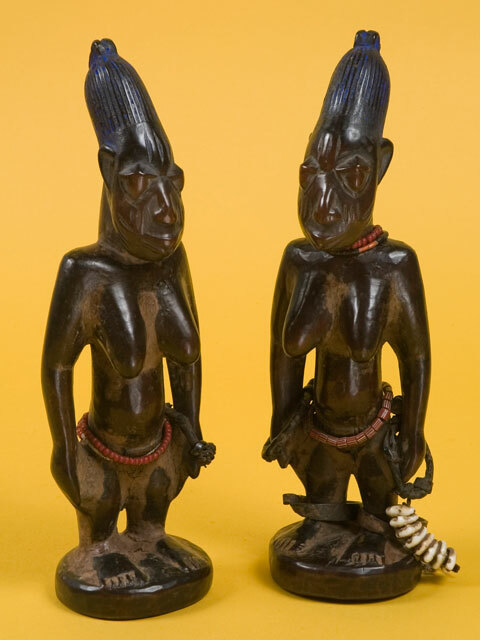
A pair of female ere ibeji twin figures (early 20th-century) in the permanent collection of The Children's Museum of Indianapolis. The Yoruba people have the highest dizygotic twinning rate in the world.

About 1 in 90 human births (1.1%) results from a twin pregnancy. The rate of dizygotic twinning varies greatly among ethnic groups, ranging as high as about 45 per 1000 births (4.5%) for the Yoruba to 10% for Linha São Pedro, a tiny Brazilian settlement which belongs to the city of Cândido Godói. In Cândido Godói, one in five pregnancies has resulted in twins. The Argentine historian Jorge Camarasa has put forward the theory that experiments of the Nazi doctor Josef Mengele could be responsible for the high ratio of twins in the area. His theory was rejected by Brazilian scientists who had studied twins living in Linha São Pedro; they suggested genetic factors within that community as a more likely explanation. A high twinning rate has also been observed in other places of the world, including:

- Igbo-Ora in Nigeria
- Kodinhi, located in Kerala, India
- Mohammadpur Umri, located in Uttar Pradesh, India

In a study on the maternity records of 5750 Hausa women living in the Savannah zone of Nigeria, there were 40 twins and 2 triplets per 1000 births. Twenty-six percent of twins were monozygotic. The incidence of multiple births, which was about five times higher than that observed in any western population, was significantly lower than that of other ethnic groups, who live in the hot and humid climate of the southern part of the country. The incidence of multiple births was related to maternal age but did not bear any association to the climate or prevalence of malaria.

Twins are more common in people of African descent.

=== Predisposing factors ===
The predisposing factors of monozygotic twinning are unknown.

Dizygotic twin pregnancies are slightly more likely when the following factors are present in the woman:

- She is of West African descent (especially Yoruba)
- She is between the age of 30 and 40 years
- She is greater than average height and weight
- She has had several previous pregnancies.

Women undergoing certain fertility treatments may have a greater chance of dizygotic multiple births. In the United States it has been estimated that by 2011 36% of twin births resulted from conception by assisted reproductive technology.

The risk of twin birth can vary depending on what types of fertility treatments are used. With in vitro fertilisation (IVF), this is primarily due to the insertion of multiple embryos into the uterus. Ovarian hyperstimulation without IVF has a very high risk of multiple birth. Reversal of anovulation with clomifene (trade names including Clomid) has a relatively less but yet significant risk of multiple pregnancy.

== Delivery interval ==
A 15-year German study of 8,220 vaginally delivered twins (that is, 4,110 pregnancies) in Hesse yielded a mean delivery time interval of 13.5 minutes. The delivery interval between the twins was measured as follows:

- Within 15 minutes: 75.8%
- 16–30 minutes: 16.4%
- 31–45 minutes: 4.3%
- 46–60 minutes: 1.7%
- Over 60 minutes: 1.8%

The study stated that the occurrence of complications "was found to be more likely with increasing twin-to-twin delivery time interval" and suggested that the interval be kept short, though it noted that the study did not examine causes of complications and did not control for factors such as the level of experience of the obstetrician, the wish of the women giving birth, or the "management strategies" of the procedure of delivering the second twin.

There have also been cases in which twins are born a number of days apart. Possibly the worldwide record for the duration of the time gap between the first and the second delivery was the birth of twins 97 days apart in Cologne, Germany, the first of which was born on November 17, 2018.

== Complications during pregnancy ==
=== Vanishing twins ===
Researchers suspect that as many as 1 in 8 pregnancies start out as multiples, but only a single fetus is brought to full term, because the other fetus has died very early in the pregnancy and has not been detected or recorded. Early obstetric ultrasonography exams sometimes reveal an "extra" fetus, which fails to develop and instead disintegrates and vanishes in the uterus. There are several reasons for the "vanishing" fetus, including it being embodied or absorbed by the other fetus, placenta or the mother. This is known as vanishing twin syndrome. Also, in an unknown proportion of cases, two zygotes may fuse soon after fertilization, resulting in a single chimeric embryo, and, later, fetus.

=== Conjoined twins ===
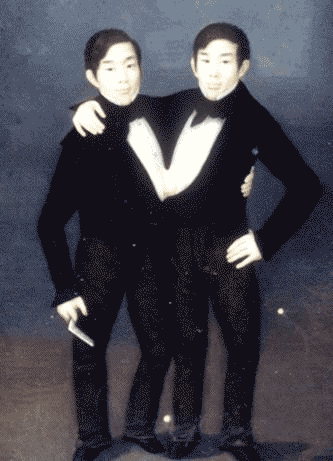
Chang and Eng Bunker, born in Siam (now Thailand) in 1811, were the origin of the term Siamese twins.

Conjoined twins (or the once-commonly used term Siamese) are monozygotic twins whose bodies are joined during pregnancy. This occurs when the zygote starts to split after day 12 following fertilization and fails to separate completely. This condition occurs in about 1 in 50,000 human pregnancies. Most conjoined twins are now evaluated for surgery to attempt to separate them into separate functional bodies. The degree of difficulty rises if a vital organ or structure is shared between twins, such as the brain, heart, liver or lungs.

=== Chimerism ===
A chimera is an ordinary person or animal except that some of their parts actually came from their twin or from the mother. A chimera may arise either from monozygotic twin fetuses (where it would be impossible to detect), or from dizygotic fetuses, which can be identified by chromosomal comparisons from various parts of the body. The number of cells derived from each fetus can vary from one part of the body to another, and often leads to characteristic mosaicism skin coloration in human chimeras. In one case DNA tests falsely determined that a woman, Lydia Fairchild, mystifyingly, was not the mother of two of her three children; she was found to be a chimera, and the two children were conceived from eggs derived from cells of their mother's twin.

=== Parasitic twins ===
Sometimes one twin fetus will fail to develop completely and continue to cause problems for its surviving twin. One fetus acts as a parasite towards the other. Sometimes the parasitic twin becomes an almost indistinguishable part of the other, and sometimes this needs to be treated medically.

=== Partial molar twins ===
A very rare type of parasitic twinning is one where a single viable twin is endangered when the other zygote becomes cancerous, or molar. This means that the molar zygote's cellular division continues unchecked, resulting in a cancerous growth that overtakes the viable fetus. Typically, this results when one twin has either triploidy or complete paternal uniparental disomy, resulting in little or no fetus and a cancerous, overgrown placenta, resembling a bunch of grapes.

=== Miscarried twin ===
Occasionally, a woman will suffer a miscarriage early in pregnancy, yet the pregnancy will continue; one twin was miscarried but the other was able to be carried to term. This occurrence is similar to the vanishing twin syndrome, but typically occurs later, as the twin is not reabsorbed.

=== Low birth weight ===
It is very common for twins to be born at a low birth weight. More than half of twins are born weighing less than 5.5 pounds (2.5 kg), while the average birth weight of a healthy baby should be around 6–8 pounds (3–4 kg). This is largely due to the fact that twins are typically born premature. Premature birth and low birth weights, especially when under 3.5 pounds (1.6 kg), can increase the risk of several health-related issues, such as vision and hearing loss, mental disabilities, and cerebral palsy. There is an increased possibility of potential complications as the birth weight of the baby decreases.

=== Twin-to-twin transfusion syndrome ===
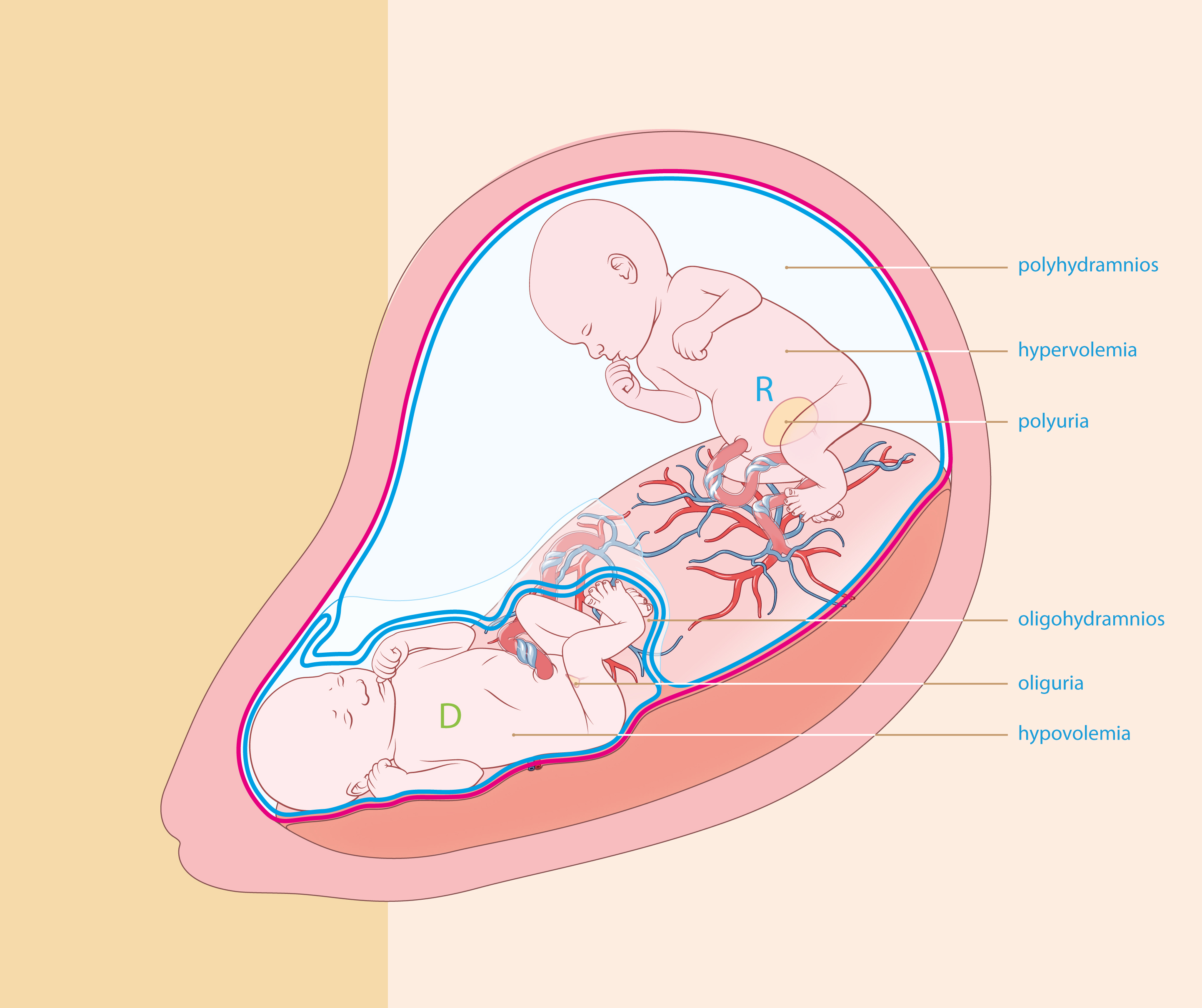
Twin-to-twin transfusion syndrome (TTTS) illustration of twins showing one fetus with exposure to more amniotic fluid while the other is "stuck" with the membrane tightly around itself

Monozygotic twins who share a placenta can develop twin-to-twin transfusion syndrome. This condition means that blood from one twin is being diverted into the other twin. One twin, the 'donor' twin, is small and anemic, the other, the 'recipient' twin, is large and polycythemic. The lives of both twins are endangered by this condition.

=== Stillbirths ===
Stillbirths occurs when a fetus dies after 20 weeks of gestation. There are two types of stillbirth, including intrauterine death and intrapartum death. Intrauterine death occurs when a baby dies during late pregnancy. Intrapartum death, which is more common, occurs when a baby dies while the mother is giving birth. The cause of stillbirth is often unknown, but the rate of babies who are stillborn is higher in twins and multiple births. Caesareans or inductions are advised after 38 weeks of pregnancy for twins, because the risk of stillbirth increases after this time.

=== Heterotopic pregnancy ===
Heterotopic pregnancy is an exceedingly rare type of dizygotic twinning in which one twin implants in the uterus as normal and the other remains in the fallopian tube as an ectopic pregnancy. Ectopic pregnancies must be resolved because they can be life-threatening to the mother. However, in most cases, the intrauterine pregnancy can be salvaged.

== Management of birth ==
For otherwise healthy twin pregnancies where both twins are head down, a trial of vaginal delivery is recommended at between 37 and 38 weeks. Vaginal delivery in this case does not worsen the outcome for the infant as compared with Caesarean section. There is controversy on the best method of delivery where the first twin is head first and the second is not. When the first twin is not head down a caesarean section is often recommended. It is estimated that 75% of twin pregnancies in the United States were delivered by caesarean section in 2008. In comparison, the rate of caesarean section for all pregnancies in the general population varies between 14% and 40%. In twins that share the same placenta, delivery may be considered at 36 weeks. For twins who are born early, there is insufficient evidence for or against placing preterm stable twins in the same cot or incubator (co-bedding).

== Human twin studies ==
Twin studies are utilized in an attempt to determine how much of a particular trait is attributable to either genetics or environmental influence. These studies compare monozygotic and dizygotic twins for medical, genetic, or psychological characteristics to try to isolate genetic influence from epigenetic and environmental influence. Twins that have been separated early in life and raised in separate households are especially sought after for these studies, which have been used widely in the exploration of human nature. Classical twin studies are now being supplemented with molecular genetic studies which identify individual genes.

== Unusual twinnings ==
=== Bi-paternal twins ===
This phenomenon is known as heteropaternal superfecundation. A 1992 study estimated from a sample of 127 cases that among dizygotic twins whose parents were involved in disputed parentage cases, the frequency of heteropaternal superfecundation was approximately 2.4%. Only one case has ever been recorded in Britain.

=== Mixed twins ===
Dizygotic twins from biracial couples can sometimes be mixed twins, which exhibit differing ethnic and racial features. One such pairing was born in London in 1993 to a white mother and Caribbean father.

=== Monozygotic twins of different sexes ===
Among monozygotic twins, in extremely rare cases, twins have been born with different sexes (one male, one female). When monozygotic twins are born with different sexes it is because of chromosomal defects. The probability of this is so small that multiples having different sexes is universally accepted as a sound basis for in utero clinical determination that the multiples are not monozygotic.

Another abnormality that can result in monozygotic twins of different sexes is if the egg is fertilized by a male sperm but during cell division only the X chromosome is duplicated. This results in one normal male (XY) and one female with Turner syndrome (45,X). In these cases, although the twins did form from the same fertilized egg, it is incorrect to refer to them as genetically identical, since they have different karyotypes.

=== Semi-identical (sesquizygotic) twins ===
Monozygotic twins can develop differently, due to their genes being differently activated. More unusual are semi-identical twins, also known as sesquizygotic. As of 2019, only two cases have been reported. These "half-identical twins" are hypothesized to occur when an ovum is fertilized by two sperm (polyspermy). The cell assorts the chromosomes by heterogonesis and the cell divides into two, with each daughter cell now containing the correct number of chromosomes. The cells continue to develop into a morula. If the morula then undergoes a twinning event, two embryos will be formed, with different paternal genes but identical maternal genes.

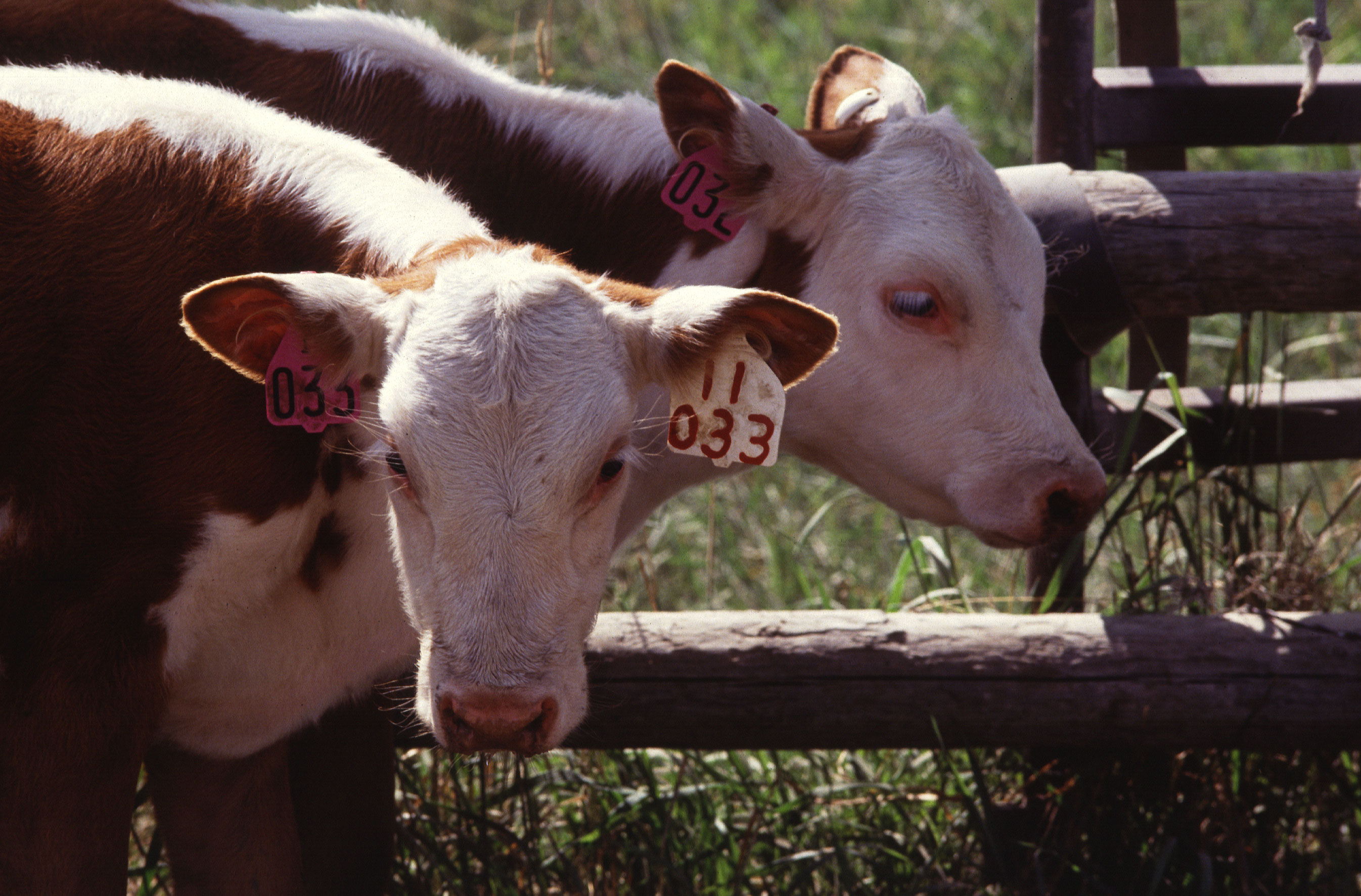
Twin calves of the Hereford breed in Miles City, Montana

In 2007, a study reported a case of a pair of living twins, which shared an identical set of maternal chromosomes, while each having a distinct set of paternal chromosomes, albeit from the same man, and thus they most likely share half of their father's genetic makeup. The twins were both found to be chimeras. One was an intersex XX, and one an XY male. The exact mechanism of fertilization could not be determined but the study stated that it was unlikely to be a case of polar body twinning.

The likely genetic basis of semi-identical twins was reported in 2019 by Michael Gabbett and Nicholas Fisk. In their seminal publication, Gabbett, Fisk and colleagues documented a second case of sesquizygosis and presented molecular evidence of the phenomenon. The reported twins shared 100% of their maternal chromosomes and 78% of their paternal genomic information. The authors presented evidence that two sperm from the same man fertilized an ovum simultaneously. The chromosomes assorted themselves through heterogonesis to form three cell lines. The purely paternal cell line died out due to genomic imprinting lethality, while the other two cell lines, each consisting of the same maternal DNA but only 50% identical paternal DNA, formed a morula which subsequently split into twins.

=== Mirror image twins ===
Mirror image twins result when a fertilized egg splits later in the embryonic stage than normal timing, around day 9–12. This type of twinning could exhibit characteristics with reversed asymmetry, such as opposite dominant handedness, dental structure, or even organs (situs inversus). If the split occurs later than this time period, the twins risk being conjoined. There is no DNA-based zygosity test that can determine if twins are indeed mirror image. The term mirror image is used because the twins, when facing each other, appear as matching reflections.

== Language development ==
There have been many studies highlighting the development of language in twins compared to single-born children. These studies have converged on the notion that there is a greater rate of delay in language development in twins than in their single-born counterparts. The reasons for this are in question; however, cryptophasia was thought to be the major cause. Idioglossia is a private language that is usually invented by young children, specifically twins. Another term to describe what some people call twin talk is cryptophasia, in which a language is developed by twins that only they can understand. The increased focused communication between two twins may isolate them from their social environment. Idioglossia is rare and the attention of scientists has shifted away from this idea. However, some researchers and scientists say that cryptophasia or idioglossia is not rare. Researchers are looking into the impacts of a richer social environment for these twins to stimulate their development of language.

== Animals ==
Non-human dizygotic twinning is a common phenomenon in multiple animal species, including cats, dogs, cattle, bats, chimpanzees, and deer. This should not be confused with an animal's ability to produce a litter, because while litters are caused by the release of multiple eggs during an ovulation cycle, identical to the ovulation of dizygotic twins, they produce more than two offspring. Species such as sheep, goats, and deer have a higher propensity for dizygotic twinning, meaning that they carry a higher frequency of the allele responsible for the likelihood of twins, rather than the likelihood of litters (Whitcomb, 2021). Cases of monozygotic twinning in the animal kingdom are rare but have been recorded on a number of occasions. In 2016, a C-section of an Irish Wolfhound revealed identical twin puppies sharing a singular placenta. South African scientists, who were called in to study the identical twins wrote that... "To the best of our knowledge, this is the first report of monozygotic twinning in the dog confirmed using DNA profiling." Additionally, armadillos have also been known to produce monozygotic twins, sometimes birthing two sets of identical twins during one reproductive cycle. Monozygotic twinning in armadillos functions as an evolutionary adaptation preventing inbreeding. Once an armadillo offspring enters its reproductive stage, the organism is forced to leave the nest in search of its mate, rather than mating with its siblings. Not only does monozygotic twinning dissuade from armadillo siblings inbreeding, but by forcing migration from the nest, this adaptation ensures the increased genetic variation and geographical population diffusion of armadillo species.

Due to the increased parental investment provided for their offspring, larger mammals with longer life spans have slower reproductive cycles and tend to birth only one offspring at a time. This commonly repeated behavior in larger mammals evolved as a fixed, naturally-selected adaptation, resulting in a decreased twinning propensity in species such as giraffes, elephants, and hippopotami. Despite this adaptation, a case of rare monozygotic twinning has been documented in two elephant calves at the Bandipur Tiger Reserve in Karnataka, India. Chief Veterinarian of the Wildlife Trust of India, NVK Ashraf, in response to the twinning event, wrote that "in species that invest longer time in producing a baby, taking care of two twin calves will be difficult. Therefore, the incidence of twinning will be comparatively less."Ashraf's insight not only illuminates the rarity of twinning among large mammals in the natural world, but directs our attention to the increased twinning propensity of animals under human care. This increased twinning propensity is thought to be either caused by random mutation facilitated by genetic drift, or the positive selection of the "twinning" trait in human-controlled conditions. Due to the removal of natural predators and unpredictable environmental conditions with the increase of human-provided food and medical care, species residing in nature reserves, zoos, etc., carry an increased likelihood of reversing their naturally-selected traits that have been passed on for generations. When considering this phenomenon in relation to twinning, larger mammals not commonly associated with high twinning propensities can perhaps produce twins as an adaptive response to their human-controlled environment. Additionally, the high twinning propensity in species is thought to be positively correlated with the infant mortality rate of the reproducing organism's environment. Thus if a species lives in a controlled environment with a low infant mortality rate, the frequency of the "twinning trait" could increase, leading to a higher likelihood of producing twin offspring. In the case of the monozygotic twin calves in India, their existence could be connected to a new, positively selected adaptation of twinning attributed to species living under human care (Ward, 2014, p. 7-11).

Species with small physicalities and quick reproductive cycles carry high twinning propensities as a result of increased predation and high mortality rates. As scientists continue to study the origin of dizygotic twinning in the animal kingdom, many have turned to species that demonstrated an increased output of twins during periods of evolutionary distress and natural selection. Through their studies on Vespertilionidae and Cebidae species, scientists Guilherme Siniciato Terra Garbino and Marco Varella have proven that smaller species experiencing infertility in old age and/or unstable habits as a result of increased predation or human interference have undergone natural selection in gaining even higher twinning propensities. In his study on the evolution of litter size in bats, Garbino discovered that the vespertilionidae genus has higher twinning propensities as a result of their high roosting habitats. When tracked phylogenetically, scientists determined that the common ancestor of bats carried a higher twinning propensity which was then lost, and picked up again, eighteen times in evolutionary history. While other bat subfamilies such as Myotinae and Murinae inevitably lost the twinning trait, the family Vespertilionidae retained a high trait frequency due to mutation and environmental conditions that triggered natural selection. The height and exposed nature of Vespertilionidae's roosting locations resulted in a sharp increase in species mortality rate. Natural selection offsets these dangers by positively selecting high twinning propensity, resulting in not only Vespertilionidae's increased ability to produce twins but the increased likelihood of the genus's reproductive survival. This means that despite the family's high exposure to factors that would seemingly increase mortality rates, Vespertilionidae counteracts their environmental conditions through the evolutionary adaptation of dizygotic twins.

The prevalence of dizygotic twinning in monkeys is thought to be an "insurance adaptation" for mothers reproducing at the end of their fertile years. While dizygotic twinning has been observed in species such as gorillas and chimpanzees, monkeys in the cebidae genus are found to be more likely to produce twins because of their small size and insect-based diet. This is because their small size indicates shorter gestation periods and the rapid maturation of offspring, resulting in a shorter lifespan where organisms are rapidly replaced by newer generations. The smaller size of the cebidae genus also makes these species more susceptible to predators, thus triggering the heightened pace of birth, maturation, reproduction, and death. Meanwhile, cebidae's insectivorous existence can be correlated with this genus's heightened ability to reproduce, as more resources become available, more organisms can take advantage of these resources. Thus, monkeys that are smaller and have more access to food, such as the cebidae genus, have the ability to produce more offspring at a quicker pace. In terms of dizygotic twinning, it has been observed that older mothers within the cebidae genus have a higher chance of producing twins than those at the beginning stages of their fertility. Despite their access to resources, the cebidae genus has a high mortality rate attributed to their size, meaning that in order to "keep up" their quickened lifecycle, they must produce an excess of offspring in ensuring generational survival. The positively-selected adaptation of twinning counteracts the genus's high mortality rate by giving older mothers the chance to produce more than one offspring. This not only increases the likelihood that one or more of these offspring will reach reproductive maturity, but gives the mother a chance to birth at least one viable offspring despite their age. Due to their short life cycles, the cebidae genus is more inclined to produce dizygotic twins in their older reproductive years, thus signaling that the trait of high twinning propensity is one that is passed down in service of this genus's survival.

== See also ==
- Cloning
- Doppelgänger
- Evil twin
- Gemini (astrology)
- List of multiple births
- List of twins
- Litter (animal)
- Look-alike
- Mixed twins
- Multiple birth
- Superfecundation
- Twin study
- Twin towns and sister cities
- Twins in mythology
- Virtual twin
