= Twin Township, Ohio =

Twin Township, Ohio may refer to:

- Twin Township, Darke County, Ohio
- Twin Township, Preble County, Ohio
- Twin Township, Ross County, Ohio

== See also ==
- Twin Township (disambiguation)
- Twinsburg Township, Summit County, Ohio
