= Olav Jørgen Hegge =

Olav Jørgen Hegge (died August 26, 2005) was a Norwegian Hardanger fiddler and folk dancer with American ties.

He was raised in Øystre Slidre Municipality in Valdres, Norway. Many members of his family included fiddlers and dancers. Considered a leading tradition bearer of the Hardanger fiddle and the dance style from his home valley, he both played, danced, and taught others for over 35 years.

He was the recipient of the 1996 Saga Prize (Saga-prisen) by Saga Petroleum ASA. He was named a master teacher by Norsk Folkemusikk- og Danselag. He was the founder of the Twin Cities Hardingfelelag of Minnesota in 1996. He also judged fiddle competitions, both regional and national, and taught Hardanger fiddle at the University of Oslo and the Ole Bull Academy in Voss Municipality.

Olav and his wife Mary Sanford Hegge would trade time throughout the year between Norway and Saint Paul, Minnesota until Olav died August 26, 2005. Mary continues to dance and teach at the American Swedish Institute, and Tapestry Folkdance Center.
