= Twin Cities (disambiguation) =

Twin Cities refers to the Minneapolis–Saint Paul metropolitan area in the U.S. state of Minnesota.

Twin Cities or twin cities may also refer to:

== Concept ==
- Twin cities, the general concept of neighboring cities

== Organizations ==
- TCF Financial Corporation (Twin Cities Federal), a defunct bank
- Twin Cities Hardingfelelag, a musical group
- Twin Cities Marathon, an annual running event
- Twin Cities PBS, a television station
- Twin Cities Phoenix, a defunct soccer team
- Twin Cities Pride

== Places ==
- Twin Cities Army Ammunition Plant

== Railroad ==
- Twin Cities Hiawatha
- Twin Cities and Western Railroad
- Twin Cities Zephyr
- Twin Cities 400

== See also ==
- Sister city
- Twin city (disambiguation)
