= Superfecundation =

Multiple births from different fathers

Superfecundation is the fertilization of two or more ova from the same menstrual cycle by sperm from the same or different males, whether through separate acts of intercourse or during a single sexual encounter with multiple males. This can result in twin babies that have different biological fathers.

The term superfecundation is derived from fecund, meaning able to produce offspring. Homopaternal superfecundation is a form of twinning where fertilization of two separate ova occurs as a result of two or more distinct instances of intercourse or insemination with the same male partner or donor, leading to fraternal twins. Heteropaternal superfecundation, on the other hand, is an atypical form of twinning that results in twins that are genetically half siblings – sharing the same biological mother, but with different biological fathers. Known cases of heteropaternal superfecundation are very rare, but more may be discovered as testing methods improve and paternity tests increase.

== Conception ==
Sperm cells can live inside a human female's body for up to five days, and once ovulation occurs, the egg remains viable for 12–48 hours before it begins to disintegrate. Superfecundation most commonly happens within hours or days of the first instance of fertilization with ova released during the same cycle.

Ovulation is normally suspended during pregnancy to prevent further ova becoming fertilized and to help increase the chances of a full-term pregnancy. However, if an ovum is atypically released after the female was already impregnated when previously ovulating, a chance of a second pregnancy occurs, albeit at a different stage of development. This is known as superfetation.

== Heteropaternal superfecundation ==
Heteropaternal superfecundation is the conception by a mother of babies that are genetically half-siblings with different biological fathers.

Known case of heteropaternal superfecundation are very rare; about 19 had been reported worldwide by 2020. It has been suggested that the observed rarity was due to the lack of testing—cases are only discovered when both twins take DNA tests—with many more cases being discovered with the availability of molecular methods and the increasing number of paternity tests. Heteropaternal superfecundation is common in animals such as cats, dogs, and sheep. Stray dogs can produce litters in which every puppy has a different sire. Though rare in humans, cases have been documented. In one study on humans, the frequency was 2.4% among dizygotic twins whose parents had been involved in paternity suits.

=== Cases ===
In 1982, twins who were born with two different skin colors were discovered to be conceived as a result of heteropaternal superfecundation.

In 1995, a young woman gave birth to diamniotic monochorionic twins, who were originally assumed to be monozygotic twins until a paternity suit led to a DNA test. This led to the discovery that the twins had different fathers.

In 2001, a case of spontaneous monopaternal superfecundation was reported after a woman undergoing IVF treatments gave birth to quintuplets after only two embryos were implanted. Genetic testing supported that the twinning was not a result of the embryos splitting, and that all five boys shared the same father.

In 2008, on the Maury Show a paternity test on live television established a heteropaternal superfecundation.

In 2015, a judge in New Jersey ruled that a man should only pay child support for one of two twins, as he was only the biological father to one of the children.

In 2017, an IVF-implanted surrogate mother gave birth to twins, one biologically the child of the woman and her husband, and the other genetically unrelated, from an implanted embryo (not superfecundation as such).

In 2019, a Chinese woman was reported to have had twin babies from different fathers, one of whom was her husband and the other was a man having a secret affair with her during the same time.

In 2022, a 19-year-old Brazilian from Mineiros gave birth to twins from two different fathers with whom she had sex on the same day.

A pair of adult English twins who discovered they had different fathers described in 2026 the human implications of the gradual discovery. The same case is discussed in episodes 1 and 2 of series 3 of the BBC Radio 4 programme The Gift, presented by Jenny Kleeman.

== Mythology & fiction ==
Superfecundation is categorized as A515.1.1.1 in Stith Thompson's motif-index.

There are many mythical cases of superfecundation in Greek mythology:

- Leda lies with both her husband Tyndareus and with the god Zeus, and bears two sons Castor and Pollux, Castor being Tyndareus' and Pollux Zeus'. Sometimes they are said to be have been both born to the same father, either Tyndareus or Zeus.
- Alcmene lies with Zeus, who is disguised as her husband Amphitryon; Alcmene later lies with the real Amphitryon and gives birth to two sons: Iphicles by Amphitryon and Heracles by Zeus.
- Chione lies with both Apollo and Hermes on the same night, and falls pregnant. She bears two sons; Autolycus for Hermes and Philammon for Apollo.

Superfecundation appears in the November 2024 Saturday Night Live sketch "Babymoon".

== See also ==
- Chimera (genetics)
- Mixed twins
- Polyandry in nature
- Polyspermy
- Twins
