= Heterogonesis =

Heterogonesis describes the segregation of parental genomes into distinct cell lineages in the dividing zygote.

Fertilisation occurs when an ovum fuses with a sperm, forming a zygote. Normally, the genomes of the two parents assort into two diploid bi-parental daughter cells. In a heterogoneic cell division, the genome of only one parent assorts into a single daughter cell following the formation of a tripolar (rather than the normal bipolar) spindle apparatus. Heterogonesis allows for chromosomal segregation to occur in a dispermic fertilisation which may subsequently result in chimerism or sesquizygosis.

The term heterogonesis was coined in 2016 by Destouni and Vermeesch who observed the phenomenon in bovine zygotes. The word is derived from the Greek meaning "different parental origin".
