= Ibarapa Central =

- LGA
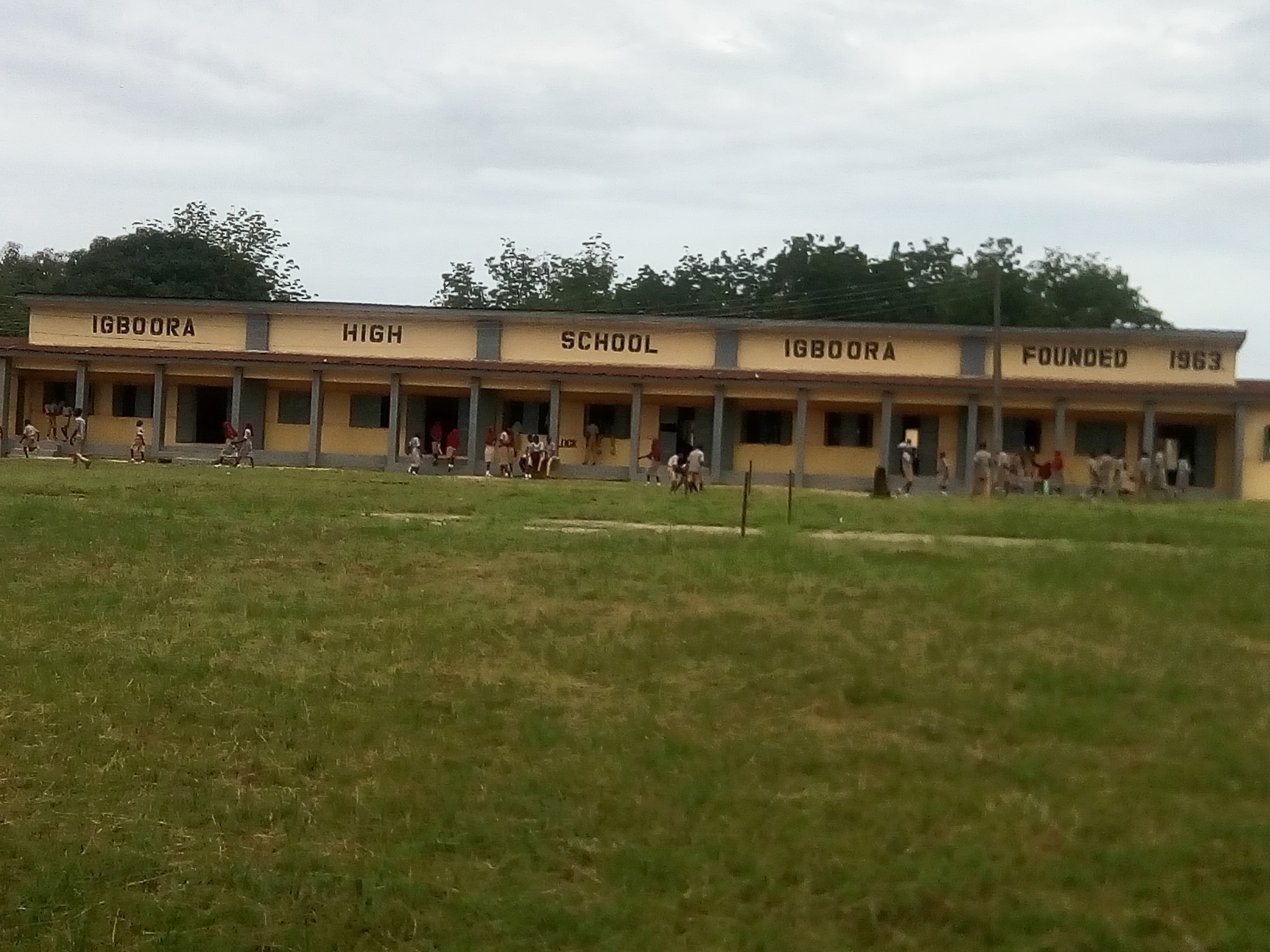
- Igbo-Ora High School I located directly opposite Oyo State College of Agriculture in Igbo-Ora, Ibarapa Central LGA, Oyo state.
- Interactive map of Ibarapa Central
- Country: Nigeria
- State: Oyo State
- Headquarter: Igbo-Ora

Government
  - Local Government Chairman and the Head of the Local Government Council: Olusola Ayodele Adeleke (PDP)

Area
  - Total: 440 km^{2} (170 sq mi)

Population (2006)
  - Total: 102,979
  - Density: 230/km^{2} (610/sq mi)
- Time zone: UTC+1 (WAT)
- Postal code: 201

Ibarapa Central is a Local Government Area in Oyo State, Nigeria. The Ibarapa central consist of Igbo-Ora and Idere town. Its headquarter is in the town of Igbo-Ora.

It has an area of 440 km^{2} and a population of 102,979 at the 2006 census. In 2018 the population is estimated to be around 322,189 people. The local population is made up predominantly of Ibarapa people, who are in turn a Yoruba ethnic subgroup.

The postal code of the area is 201.
