= Sister city (disambiguation) =

A sister city is an agreement between two cities that promotes cultural and commercial ties.

Sister city or twin town may also refer to:

== Geography and cities ==
- Sister Cities International, organisation that deals with sister cities
- Twin cities, cities close together that form a conurbation
- Twin Cities, conurbation of St. Paul and Minneapolis in USA

== Popular culture ==
- Twin Town, 1997 British dark comedy film
- Sister Cities (album), 2018 album by the Wonder Years
- Sister Cities (film), 2016 American drama television film

== See also ==
- Twin city (disambiguation)
- Twin town (disambiguation)
