= Mixed twins =

Non-identical, multiracial twins

Mixed twins are fraternal or non-identical twins born to multiracial families which differ in skin color and other traits considered to be racial features.

From a biological point of view, the differences in these fraternal or dizygotic twins from two biracial parents are not surprising. In humans, a relatively small number of genes are thought to be responsible for human skin color. Different alleles or gene variants code for differences in the melanin found within the skin. Within some groups are high frequencies of dark skin alleles, while others have high frequencies of light skin alleles, for example. The parents of such twins, who are typically both of mixed race, have a combination of alleles for light and dark skin in their genome.

Each sperm or egg cell possesses a random selection of genes from its mother or father. While not the most probable event, a sperm or egg may randomly acquire, for example, mostly alleles that confer light skin coloration or mostly alleles that confer dark skin coloration. In such cases, fraternal twins can differ from each other quite dramatically in terms of skin color or other physical characteristics.

Numerous sets of mixed twins have been born.

Much more rarely, mixed twins can arise as a result of heteropaternal superfecundation.

== In popular culture ==
While mixed twins are not as common in popular culture as identical ones, there are exceptions.

In the 1970s reboot of Wonder Woman, the white-skinned Diana has a black-skinned twin sister named Nubia, who was kidnapped at birth by Ares and is historically DC Comics' first black superheroine. Though Nubia's story has been retconned over the years since her first appearance, her original identity as Diana's fraternal twin sister was retold in the 2021 young adult graphic novel Nubia: Real One.

In the 2010 young adult novel The Other Half of My Heart by Sundee T. Frazier, the biracial King twin sisters—the white Minerva and the black Keira—deal with prejudice when their black maternal grandmother invites them to compete for the title of Miss Black Pearl Preteen of America.
