= Teyyala =

Theyyala
- Village
- Location in Kerala, India Theyyala (India)
- Coordinates: 10°59′30″N 75°55′0″E
- Country: India
- State: Kerala
- District: Malappuram

Languages
  - Official: Malayalam, English
- Time zone: UTC+5:30 (IST)
- PIN: 676320

Theyyala is a small town in Malappuram district in Kerala, India. Theyyala is near the sea with the beach being only 5 km away. The nearest Railway station is at Tanur which is 4 km away. The nearest airport is Calicut International Airport, at a distance of 25 km, approximately. The nearest city is Tirur which is only 9 km away and so is Kottakkal which is famous worldwide for Ayurvedic Treatments.

The National Highway (NH 47) is 5 km away from Theyyala and meets at Venniyur. This National Highway connects the entire Kerala stretch from Trivandrum to Kasargod.

== Sports and Games ==
The people of Theyyala are highly entertainment and sports oriented. There exists a club named Youth Association of Theyyala (YAT) which conducts stage shows and sports tournaments every year. YAT conducts Sevens football tournaments which is played between teams from nearby villages. An annual cricket tournament is also conducted in the ground called as VALIYA VALAPPU which is near Ayyaya Road.

== Education ==
There are many famous schools in and around Theyyala. One of them is the SSMHS which is located in Schoolpadi. The road network connects all the nearby places from Theyyala. Taking a left from the town leads to Kottakkal and Calicut Via Venniyur. The road towards the west from the town leads to Tanur via Pandimuttam, Moochikkal etc. From Pandimuttam, the right turn leads to Chemmad via Velliyampuram and Kodinhi. Taking a left turn leads to Tirur via Vattathani, Chembra etc.

== Economy ==
Gulf money is one of the major income of native people, with at least a person from each family abroad the standard of living is pretty high.

== Culture ==
Theyyala village is a predominantly Muslim populated area. Hindus exist in comparatively smaller numbers. So the culture of the locality is based upon Muslim traditions. Duff Muttu, Kolkali and Aravanamuttu are common folk arts of this locality. There are many libraries attached to mosques giving a rich source of Islamic studies. Most of the books are written in Arabi-Malayalam which is a version of the Malayalam language written in Arabic script. People gather in mosques for the evening prayer and continue to sit there after the prayers discussing social and cultural issues. Business and family issues are also sorted out during these evening meetings. The Hindu minority of this area keeps their rich traditions by celebrating various festivals in their temples. Hindu rituals are done here with a regular devotion like other parts of Kerala.
