= Domingo (Saturday Night Live) =

Recurring character on Saturday Night Live

- Saturday Night Live character
- First appearance: October 12, 2024; SNL season 50, episode 3
- Last appearance: October 18, 2025; SNL season 51, episode 3
- Created by: Jimmy Fowlie; Ceara O'Sullivan
- Portrayed by: Marcello Hernandez

Domingo is a recurring character on American sketch comedy show Saturday Night Live, portrayed by cast member Marcello Hernandez, first appearing on the episode broadcast on October 12, 2024, hosted by Ariana Grande.

The sketches detail the ongoing affair between Domingo (Hernandez) and Kelsey (Chloe Fineman), whose wedding to Matthew (Andrew Dismukes) is the focus of the first sketch. Since its first appearance, the sketch was returned multiple times, with more characters being introduced. Each sketch also includes a parody of a popular song, with lyrics changed to describe the character's actions.

== Bridesmaid speech ==
At Kelsey and Matthew's wedding, Kelsey's half-sister (Grande) and Kelsey's three best friends and bridesmaids, referred to as the Kel-Squad (Heidi Gardner, Ego Nwodim, and Sarah Sherman), badly perform a song detailing the women's bachelorette trip in Charleston, South Carolina (to the tune of "Espresso" by Sabrina Carpenter). The song details how Kelsey met a man called Domingo and cheated on Matthew with him. In the middle of the song, Domingo shows up and sings to Kelsey. At the end of the sketch, Kelsey apparently leaves Matthew for Domingo.

== Babymoon ==
Domingo returned to SNL on November 16, 2024.

Kelsey is back with Matthew and pregnant with his baby. At Kelsey's baby shower, Kelsey's cousin (Charli XCX) and the Kel-Squad (Gardner, Nwodim, Sherman) sing a song about Kelsey's babymoon, to the beat of "Hot to Go!" by Chappell Roan. They detail how Kelsey is still in contact with Domingo and how she is pregnant with twins, one fathered by Matthew and one by Domingo. Domingo and Kelsey then shock Matthew by announcing the children will be raised in Miami.

== Vow renewal ==
Domingo returned for the third time as part of the Saturday Night Live 50th Anniversary Special, which aired on February 16, 2025.

At Kelsey and Matthew's vow renewal, Kelsey's parents (Martin Short and Molly Shannon) give a drunken speech. Then, Kelsey's childhood best friend Sophie (Carpenter) and the Kel-Squad (Gardner, Nwodim, Sherman) sing about a girls' trip to New York City, where they went to see Wicked on Broadway, then visited Madame Tussauds and Central Park. They sing about how Kelsey said she will try to commit to monogamy with Matthew (to the beat of "Defying Gravity", in reference to Grande's role in the film adaptation), only to later throw a coin into a fountain wishing she could be with Domingo (to the beat of "You Belong with Me" by Taylor Swift). Domingo appears once again to sing with the girls, suggesting that he, Kelsey, and Matthew should pursue an open relationship.

Then, Matthew's groomsmen (Bowen Yang, Andy Samberg, Kyle Mooney, Beck Bennett) sing about a golf trip they took with Sophie to Scottsdale, Arizona (to the beat of "Espresso"), where Matthew cheated on Kelsey with a man named Ronaldo (Pedro Pascal), who is Domingo's brother. They are joined by a third brother, Santiago (Bad Bunny), who has history with Kelsey's mother.

== Birthday ==
Domingo returned for the fourth time on October 18, 2025, as a cold open. At Matthew's 30th birthday party, Kelsey invites Sophie (Carpenter) and the Kel-Squad (Sherman, Ashley Padilla and Veronika Slowikowska) to sing about a trip they took to Nashville (set to the tunes of "The Fate of Ophelia" by Taylor Swift, "Abracadabra" by Lady Gaga and "Ordinary" by Alex Warren) to find Matthew the perfect gift.

== Reception ==
The first sketch gained viral attention online, racking up 11 million views on YouTube and 15.2 million on TikTok by November 26, 2024.

== Appearances outside SNL ==
On November 17, 2024, Hernandez made an in-character appearance at Sabrina Carpenter's Short n' Sweet tour show in Los Angeles.

Hernandez made a brief cameo as Domingo during Jack Black's induction into the Five-Timers Club.
