= List of Saturday Night Live guests =

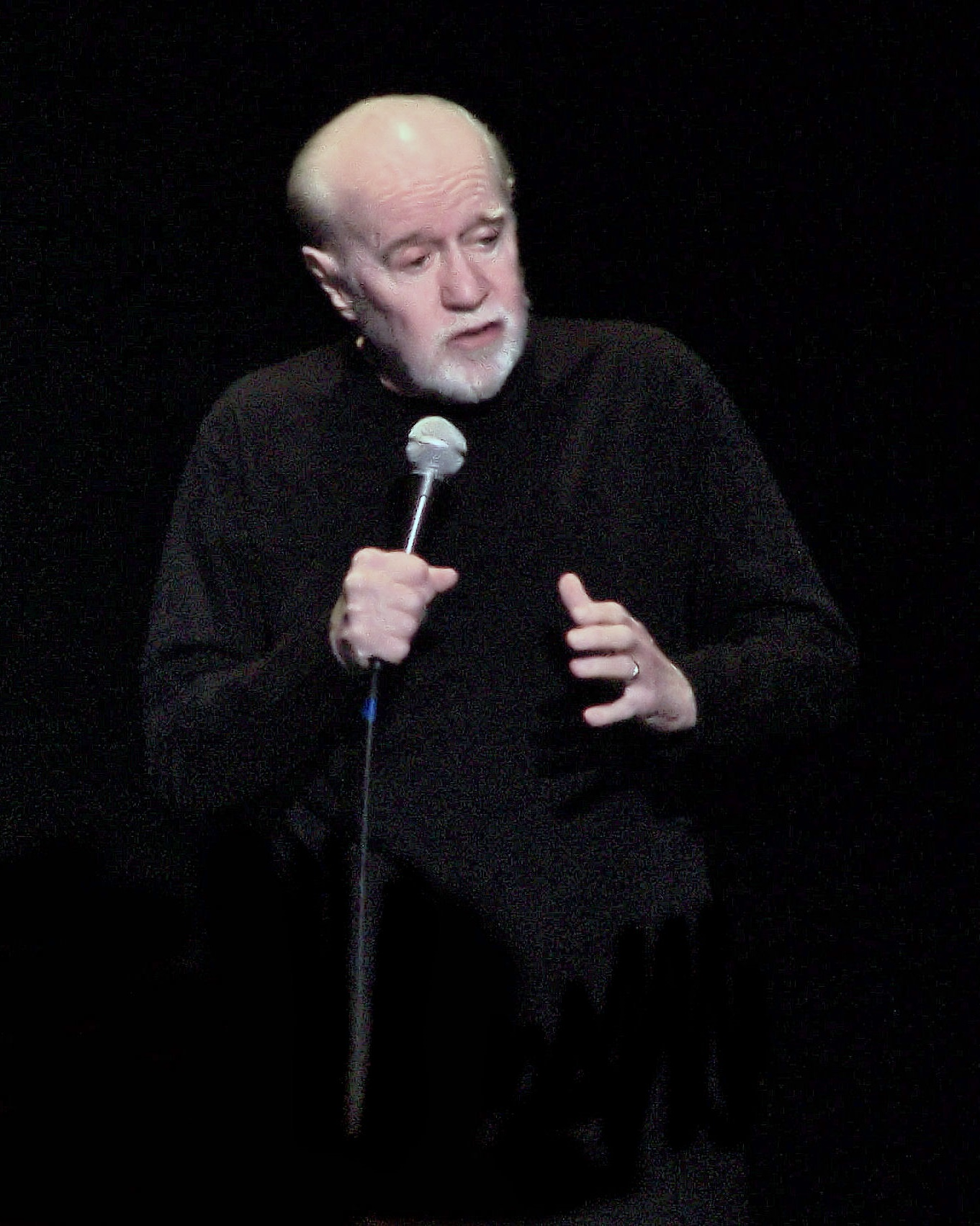
George Carlin, the first person to host Saturday Night Live

Saturday Night Live (SNL) is a late-night sketch comedy and variety show created by Lorne Michaels. It premiered on NBC on October 11, 1975, under the title NBC's Saturday Night. The show usually satirizes contemporary American popular culture and politics, and it has featured a wide array of hosts and musical guests. SNL features a two-tiered cast: the repertory members, also known as the "Not Ready for Prime-Time Players", and newer cast members, known as "Featured Players." A typical episode of SNL features a guest host, who delivers the opening monologue and goodnights, introduces the musical guest, and performs in sketches with the cast. While the format also features a musical guest, and many episodes feature celebrity cameos, the focus of the show is the guest host.

George Carlin hosted the show on its premiere episode. Three episodes later, Candice Bergen became the first female host and she was the first to host a second time later in 1975. Guests who host five times become members of the Five-Timers Club, introduced on the December 8, 1990, episode, when Tom Hanks became the seventh person to host their fifth episode. Actor Alec Baldwin holds the record for most times hosting, having done so seventeen times since 1990; Baldwin took the record from actor Steve Martin who has hosted sixteen times since 1976.

Several former cast members have returned to take on hosting duties. Original cast member Chevy Chase has hosted the most times, eight in total. Tina Fey and Will Ferrell follows behind, having hosted six times, while Bill Murray, Martin Short and Kristen Wiig have hosted five times. On December 11, 1982, Eddie Murphy became the only person to host while still a member of the cast, filling the role at the last minute when the scheduled host (his 48 Hours co-star Nick Nolte) became ill. Multiple former writers have also returned to host: Conan O'Brien (one in 2001), Louis C.K. (four since 2012), Larry David (twice since 2016) and John Mulaney (seven since 2018).

Musical guests can be solo acts or bands, who perform two to three musical numbers. Dave Grohl is the most frequent musical guest, performing on sixteen shows since 1992. There have been 47 episodes on which the show's host also served as the musical guest; the first was Paul Simon on the second episode on October 18, 1975. The most recent to pull double duty was Olivia Rodrigo on May 2, 2026. The Rolling Stones are the only group to ever serve as both host and musical guest during the same episode, which aired October 7, 1978.

In 1982, at age 7, Drew Barrymore became the youngest person to host the show. Betty White is the oldest person to host, having done so at 88 years of age in 2010; several cast members were on standby to replace her if she became fatigued but she appeared through the whole show as planned. In 2000, singer Britney Spears was the youngest person to both host and simultaneously serve as the show's musical guest, at 18 years and 161 days old.

Steven Seagal has been referred to as the worst host in the shows' history by Michaels, David Spade, Tim Meadows and Al Franken for his humorlessness and treatment of the cast and writers. Seagal hosted Season 16, Episode 18 on April 20, 1991 and has never been invited back to the show. The cast and crew's difficulties with Seagal were later echoed on-air by Michaels during guest host Nicolas Cage's monologue in the Season 18 premiere. When Cage worried that he would do so poorly that the audience would regard him as "the biggest jerk who's ever been on the show", Michaels replied: "No, no. That would be Steven Seagal."

In addition to making cameo appearances, political figures have also hosted the show. Donald Trump, who hosted in 2004 (promoting The Apprentice) and in 2015 as a presidential hopeful, is the only host who eventually became President of the United States. Al Gore hosted in 2002, the only former vice president to do so. Former, current, or future presidential candidates who have hosted include Ralph Nader (1977), Jesse Jackson and George McGovern (both 1984), Steve Forbes (1996), Rudy Giuliani (1997), John McCain (2002), and Al Sharpton (2003). Sarah Palin appeared on SNL in 2008 after weeks of Tina Fey doing impressions of her on the show. In more recent years, Bernie Sanders, Elizabeth Warren and Nikki Haley appeared on the show during their presidential campaigns in 2016, 2020 and 2024, respectively. In 2016, Hillary Clinton appeared alongside Kate McKinnon's impersonation of her. In November 2024, Vice President Kamala Harris appeared on the last pre-election episode alongside Maya Rudolph, who portrayed her on the show. The episode also featured Virginia senator and Clinton's 2016 vice presidential running mate Tim Kaine.

== Five-Timers Club ==
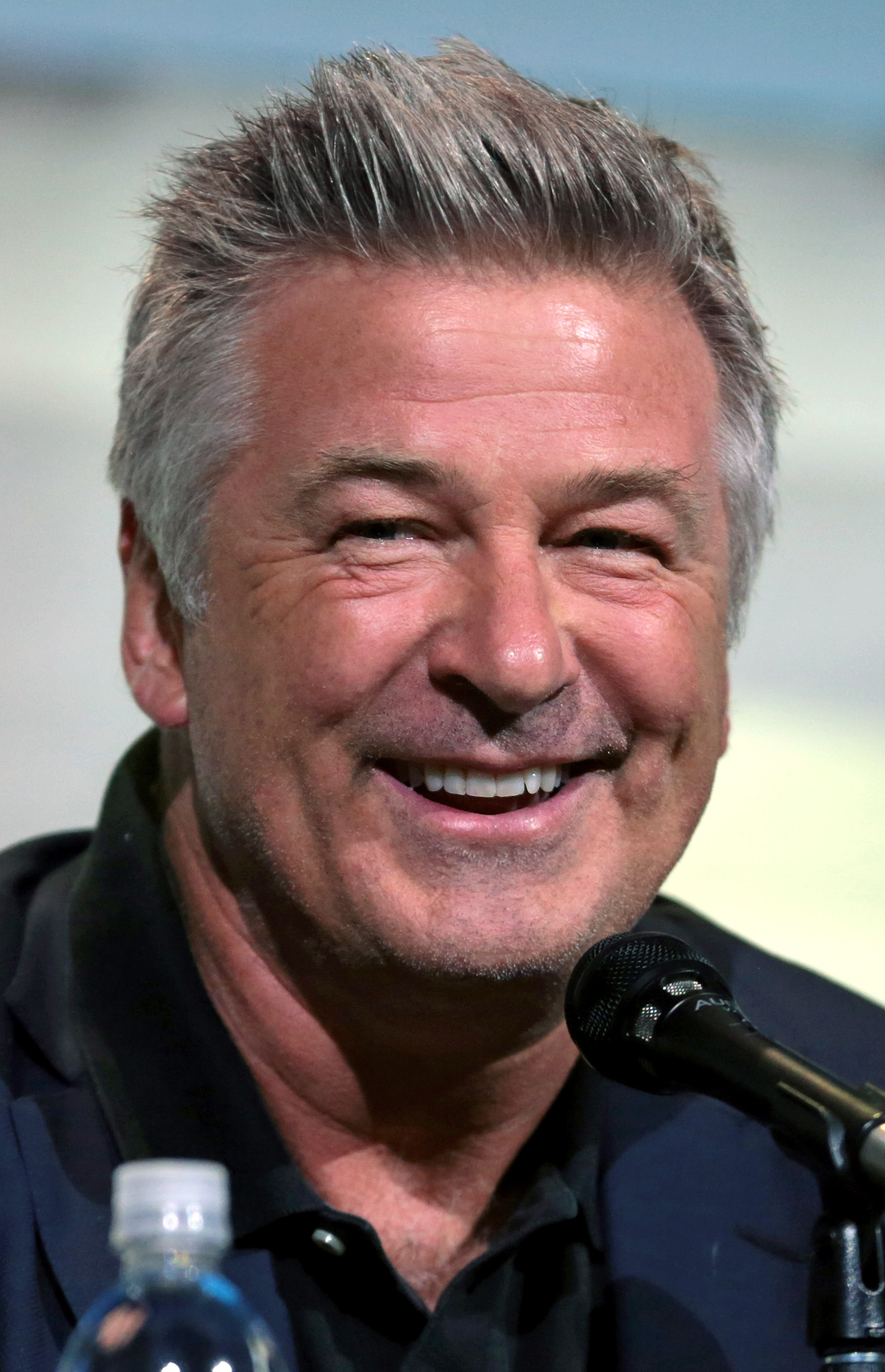
Actor Alec Baldwin is the show's most prolific host, fulfilling the role 17 times between 1990 and 2017.

=== History ===
The Five-Timers Club is the group of performers who have hosted SNL at least five times. SNL first mentioned the Club on December 8, 1990, when Tom Hanks said that it was his fifth appearance as host in his monologue:

Believe it or not, this is the fifth Saturday Night Live I have been lucky enough to host. Now, the first time you do the show, you can't believe you're here. You just can't believe it. Your head buzzes with excitement. The second time you do the show, it means you were funny enough to be asked back – and you're pushing a movie. The third time you do the show, the second time didn't go so well, and you have something to prove to yourself. The fourth time you do the show, you're just blatantly pushing a movie. But the fifth time you do the show is the most special time of all, because you get this [holds up a card] ...a membership card in the Five-Timers Club. Come with me... [walks off the stage] I'm gonna give you a chance to look in on one of the most exclusive clubs in the world.

After Hanks delivered his monologue, the show segued to a sketch set in a richly appointed private club, featuring Hanks and Five-Timers Steve Martin, Elliott Gould, and Paul Simon, who had actually only served as host four times. (Note: Simon has hosted only four times but has been included in multiple Five-Timers Club sketches because of his many other appearances as either a musical or special guest.) Then-writer Conan O'Brien appeared in a cameo as a doorman.

Chevy Chase was the first former SNL cast member to both host the show and join the Five-Timers Club. This was subsequently done by Bill Murray, Tina Fey, Will Ferrell, and Kristen Wiig. Martin Short joined this list upon hosting on December 21, 2024. Mulaney is the second former writer to join the Five-Timers Club, as Fey was the head writer as well as a cast member. The Five-Timers Club was next mentioned when Danny DeVito was inducted in 1999 (although it was actually his sixth time hosting). The mark featured on the show when reached by hosts John Goodman (1994), Alec Baldwin (1994), Christopher Walken (2001), Drew Barrymore (2007), Justin Timberlake (2013), Ben Affleck (2013), Scarlett Johansson (2017), Melissa McCarthy (2017), Dwayne Johnson (2017), Jonah Hill (2018), Paul Rudd (2021), John Mulaney (2022), Woody Harrelson (2023), Emma Stone (2023), Kristen Wiig (2024), Martin Short (2024), and Jack Black (2026).

In 2006, a sketch featuring Steve Martin and Baldwin introduced the Platinum Lounge, featuring only hosts that have hosted the show at least twelve times, on the occasion of Baldwin's 13th time hosting the show (Steve Martin had hosted 14 times at the time). Martin Short appeared as a waiter, as he would during many subsequent Five-Timers Club sketches. Since then, John Goodman has become the third person to host more than twelve times. The club has been spoofed by SNL itself. During her fourth appearance as host in April 2019, Emma Stone anticipated "Four-Timers Club" honors in her monologue. Paul Rudd was the next person to host for the fifth time, although his show was affected due to the rise of Omicron cases, which resulted in a reduced cast and no audience. During Jack Black's Five-Timers sketch in 2026, Tina Fey noted that this was her fifth time appearing in a Five-Timers Club sketch.

Jonah Hill was taken to the Club by Five-Timer Tina Fey. Once in, he is greeted by Candice Bergen and Drew Barrymore. Seeing no men in the club, Hill wonders if it's "Ladies Night". He is told by Fey that the other men "are not allowed in right now" because of presumed harassment problems. During her fifth monologue, Kristen Wiig is welcomed by multiple former hosts appearing in Five Timers jackets despite not being members, including Martin Short (hosted four times), Matt Damon (two times), Fred Armisen (once), Jon Hamm (three times), Will Forte (once), and Ryan Gosling (twice; he hosted his third episode the following week), who presented Wiig with the jacket. Actual club member Paul Rudd also appeared alongside former SNL writer Paula Pell and producer Lorne Michaels.

=== Episodes ===
Five-Timers Club episodes
Date	Host	Episode	Ref.
December 12, 1990	Tom Hanks	Hanks was in the first Five-timer's sketch with Paul Simon, Steve Martin and Elliott Gould welcoming him to the club.	
March 9, 2013	Justin Timberlake	Timberlake is welcomed to the club and he was presented with a Five-Timers jacket and he is also joined by his fellow Five-Timers members Paul Simon, Steve Martin, Chevy Chase, Alec Baldwin, Tom Hanks, and Candice Bergen with cameos from Martin Short and Dan Aykroyd.	
March 11, 2017	Scarlett Johansson	Johansson is presented with a Five-Timers jacket from longtime cast members Kate McKinnon and Kenan Thompson in her opening monologue.	
May 14, 2017	Melissa McCarthy	McCarthy is welcomed and was presented with a Five-Timers jacket from her fellow Five-Timers members Steve Martin and Alec Baldwin in the goodnights and ending credits.	
May 20, 2017	Dwayne Johnson	Johnson was presented with a Five-Timers jacket from his fellow members Alec Baldwin and Tom Hanks in his opening monologue.	
November 3, 2018	Jonah Hill	Hill is welcomed and was presented with a Five-Timers jacket from his fellow Five-Timers members Tina Fey, Candice Bergen, and Drew Barrymore in his opening monologue.	
December 18, 2021	Paul Rudd	Rudd is welcomed to the Five-Timers Club and he was presented with a Five-Timers jacket from his fellow members Tom Hanks and Tina Fey and longest-running cast member Kenan Thompson with Steve Martin and Martin Short appearing in a pre-taped message in the cold open.	
February 26, 2022	John Mulaney	Mulaney is welcomed and given a Five-Timers jacket from his fellow Five-Timers members Paul Rudd, Steve Martin, Candice Bergen, Tina Fey, and Elliott Gould with a surprise cameo appearance from Conan O'Brien.	
February 25, 2023	Woody Harrelson	Harrelson and Jack White are gifted their Five-Timer jackets by their fellow Five-Timer member Scarlett Johansson and Kenan Thompson during the goodnights and ending credits.	
December 2, 2023	Emma Stone	Stone was welcomed and given a Five-Timers jacket from her fellow Five-Timers members Tina Fey and Candice Bergen in her monologue.	
April 6, 2024	Kristen Wiig	Wiig is welcomed to the Five-Timers Club by her fellow Five-Timer member Paul Rudd and non-members Martin Short, Matt Damon, Fred Armisen, Jon Hamm, Will Forte, and Ryan Gosling (he hosted his third episode the following week), who presented Wiig with her Five-Timer jacket in her opening monologue, alongside former SNL writer Paula Pell and producer Lorne Michaels.	
December 21, 2024	Martin Short	Short is welcomed by his fellow Five-Timers members Tom Hanks, Paul Rudd, Tina Fey, Alec Baldwin, Scarlett Johansson, Kristen Wiig, Melissa McCarthy, Emma Stone, and John Mulaney with a cameo from Jimmy Fallon, who gave Short a Five-Timer jacket in the cold open.	
April 4, 2026	Jack Black	Black was welcomed into the club by his fellow Five-Timers members Jonah Hill, Tina Fey, Candice Bergen, and Melissa McCarthy, and six-time musical guest Jack White, as well as Domingo (Marcello Hernández) and Fey gave Black a Five-Timers jacket in his opening monologue.	

=== Membership ===
Five-Timers Club members
Name	Total appearances as host	First appearance	Fifth appearance	Time to reach club	Most recent hosting appearance
Buck Henry	10	January 17, 1976	November 19, 1977	1 year, 306 days	May 24, 1980
Steve Martin	16	October 23, 1976	April 22, 1978	1 year, 181 days	December 10, 2022
Elliott Gould	6	January 10, 1976	February 16, 1980	4 years, 37 days	November 15, 1980
Paul Simon	4	October 18, 1975	May 10, 1986	10 years, 204 days	December 19, 1987
Chevy Chase	8	February 18, 1978	December 6, 1986	8 years, 291 days	February 15, 1997
Candice Bergen	5	November 8, 1975	May 19, 1990	14 years, 192 days	May 19, 1990
Tom Hanks	10	December 14, 1985	December 8, 1990	4 years, 359 days	April 11, 2020
Danny DeVito	6	May 15, 1982	January 9, 1993	10 years, 239 days	December 11, 1999
John Goodman	13	December 2, 1989	May 7, 1994	4 years, 156 days	December 14, 2013
Alec Baldwin	17	April 21, 1990	December 10, 1994	4 years, 233 days	February 11, 2017
Bill Murray	5	March 7, 1981	February 20, 1999	17 years, 350 days	February 20, 1999
Christopher Walken	7	January 20, 1990	May 19, 2001	11 years, 119 days	April 5, 2008
Drew Barrymore	6	November 20, 1982	February 3, 2007	24 years, 75 days	October 10, 2009
Justin Timberlake	5	October 11, 2003	March 9, 2013	9 years, 149 days	March 9, 2013
Ben Affleck	5	February 19, 2000	May 18, 2013	13 years, 88 days	May 18, 2013
Tina Fey	6	February 23, 2008	December 19, 2015	7 years, 299 days	May 19, 2018
Scarlett Johansson	7	January 14, 2006	March 11, 2017	11 years, 56 days	May 17, 2025
Melissa McCarthy	6	October 1, 2011	May 13, 2017	5 years, 224 days	December 6, 2025
Dwayne Johnson	5	March 18, 2000	May 20, 2017	17 years, 63 days	May 20, 2017
Jonah Hill	5	March 15, 2008	November 3, 2018	10 years, 233 days	November 3, 2018
Will Ferrell	6	May 14, 2005	November 23, 2019	14 years, 193 days	May 16, 2026
Paul Rudd	5	November 15, 2008	December 18, 2021	13 years, 33 days	December 18, 2021
John Mulaney	7	April 14, 2018	February 26, 2022	3 years, 318 days	November 14, 2026
Woody Harrelson	5	November 18, 1989	February 25, 2023	33 years, 99 days	February 25, 2023
Emma Stone	5	October 23, 2010	December 2, 2023	13 years, 54 days	December 2, 2023
Kristen Wiig	5	May 11, 2013	April 6, 2024	10 years, 330 days	April 6, 2024
Martin Short	5	December 6, 1986	December 21, 2024	38 years, 15 days	December 21, 2024
Jack Black	5	January 19, 2002	April 4, 2026	24 years, 76 days	April 4, 2026

== Guest performances ==
During its first 12 seasons (1975–1987), SNL frequently featured guest performances from standups, magicians, and other unusual entertainers who would do their own act on the stage in between sketches. This variety show element was lost as the show made the cast the focus. Jack Black and Kyle Gass's comedy band Tenacious D is the only act to perform in one of these slots on the show since the 1980s.

List of guest performances
Name	Type of act	Appearances	Episodes
Andy Kaufman	Comedy/performance art	14	10/11/75; 10/25/75; 11/8/75; 2/28/76; 1/15/77; 10/15/77; 12/10/77; 3/11/78; 2/24/79; 10/20/79; 11/17/79; 12/22/79; 1/30/82; 5/15/82
Valri Bromfield	Character bits	1	10/11/75
Denny Dillon and Mark Hampton	Character bit	1	10/25/75
The Lockers	Dance group	1	10/25/75
Shelley Pryor	Short story reading	1	12/13/75
Michael O'Donoghue	Fake impressionist	6	1/17/76; 5/22/76; 5/21/77; 12/7/77 (as Mr. Mike); 5/20/78 (as Mr. Mike); 5/26/79 (as Mr. Mike)
Al Alen Petersen	Performance art	1	1/31/76
The Shapiro Sisters	Lip syncing/dancing	1	2/14/76
Franken and Davis	Comedy duo	12	1/10/76; 11/13/76; 3/12/77; 9/24/77; 11/19/77; 12/17/77; 2/25/78; 5/20/78; 10/21/78; 1/27/79; 3/17/79; 5/26/79
Ricky Jay	Magician	1	1/22/77
Dame Edna Everage	Character bit	1	10/8/77
Franklyn Ajaye	Stand-up comedy	1	11/12/77
Richard Belzer	Stand-up comedy	1	3/25/78
Bob & Ray	Comedy duo	1	12/16/78
Michael Davis	Juggling	6	10/3/81; 10/31/81; 12/12/81; 3/27/82; 5/22/82; 5/7/83
Harry Anderson	Comedy/magic	7	10/17/81; 2/27/82; 10/9/82; 12/11/82; 2/5/83; 5/14/83; 2/25/84
William Burroughs	Reading of selections from Naked Lunch and Nova Express	1	11/7/81
Marc Weiner	Character bit	1	2/6/82
Bill Irwin	Vaudeville-style comedy	1	10/23/82
Steven Wright	Stand-up comedy	5	4/16/83; 1/14/84; 1/19/85; 4/6/85; 12/14/85
Joel Hodgson	Comedy/magic	4	11/12/83; 12/10/83; 2/18/84; 5/12/84
Paula Poundstone	Stand-up comedy	1	2/11/84
Frankie Pace	Stand-up comedy	1	4/14/84
A. Whitney Brown	Stand-up comedy	1	5/5/84
Steve Landesberg	Stand-up comedy	1	3/30/85
Penn & Teller	Magic/comedy	7	11/9/85; 12/21/85; 2/8/86; 3/15/86; 4/19/86; 5/10/86; 12/13/86
Sam Kinison	Stand-up comedy	5	12/7/85; 1/18/86; 2/15/86; 5/17/86; 10/18/86
Damon Wayans	Stand-up comedy	1	5/24/86
Tenacious D	Musical comedy	1	5/2/98

== See also ==
- List of Saturday Night Live cast members
- List of Saturday Night Live writers
- List of Saturday Night Live episodes

== Bibliography ==
- Shales, Tom; Miller, James Andrew (2002). Live From New York: An Uncensored History of Saturday Night Live. United States: Hachette Book Group USA. ISBN 0-316-73565-5.
