= Karingapara =

- District: Malappuram
- State: Kerala
- Country: India

Government
  - Type: Democratic

Population (201)
  - Total: 20,000
- Time zone: IST (UTC+5:30)

Karingapara is a small village/hamlet in Tirur Taluk in Malappuram District of Kerala State, India that comes under Ozhur Panchayath.

== Location ==
It belongs to North Kerala Division. It is located 20 km towards west from District headquarters Malappuram. 6 km from Tanur. 350 km from State capital Thiruvananthapuram.

Karingapara Pin code is 676320 and postal head office is Omachappuzha.

Karingapara is surrounded by Tirurangadi Taluk towards North, Tirur Taluk towards South, Vengara Taluk towards North, Malappuram Taluk towards East .

Tirur, Kottakkal Malappuram, Ponnani, Perinthalmanna are the nearby Cities

== Transportation ==
Karingappara village connects to other parts of India through Kottakkal town. National highway No.66 passes through Kottakkal and the northern stretch connects to Goa and Mumbai. The southern stretch connects to Cochin and Trivandrum. Highway No.966 goes to Palakkad and Coimbatore.

- Railway Station: Tirur railway station is one of the major railway stations in the Malabar region. Almost every train stops here, connecting the Malappuram district to the rest of the country.
- Nearest Airport: Calicut International Airport is approximately 25 kilometers away.
