= Virtual twin =

Similar-age unrelated children brought up together

Virtual twins are two children who are generally the same age and who are not genetic siblings, yet they are "reared together since infancy". Others have defined virtual twins as "unrelated children born within nine months of each other who enter a family, through birth or adoption, in the first year of life.

This phenomenon has led to the creation of the Fullerton Virtual Twin Study (FVTS) at California State University, Fullerton (CSUF).
