= Ittilakkal =

- Village
- Location in Kerala, India Ittilakkal (India)
- Coordinates: 10°57′0″N 75°56′45″E
- Country: India
- State: Kerala
- District: Malappuram

Languages
  - Official: Malayalam, English
- Time zone: UTC+5:30 (IST)
- PIN: 676106
- Telephone code: 0494_258****
- Vehicle registration: KL-10, KL-55
- Nearest city: Tirur
- Literacy: 99.9%%
- Lok Sabha constituency: Ponnani
- Climate: Tropical monsoon (Köppen)
- Avg. summer temperature: 35 °C (95 °F)
- Avg. winter temperature: 20 °C (68 °F)

Ittilakkal is a small village in Ponmundam panchayath, Tanur Block Panchayth Malappuram district, Kerala, India. The Puthanathani - Vattathani road passes through this area. The village was a part of the Kingdom of Tanur (Vettathunad) in medieval times.

== Sports ==
This area has two noted clubs, namely Vision and Swaralaya, which played a vital role in the sports history of this locality.

== Education ==
Most of the natives have a moderate education and have completed high school.

== Transportation ==
Ittilakkal village connects to other parts of India through Tirur town. National highway No.66 passes through Tirur and the northern stretch connects to Goa and Mumbai. The southern stretch connects to Cochin and Trivandrum. Highway No.966 goes to Palakkad and Coimbatore. The nearest airport is at Kozhikode. The nearest major railway station is at Tirur.
