= Tapestry Folkdance Center =

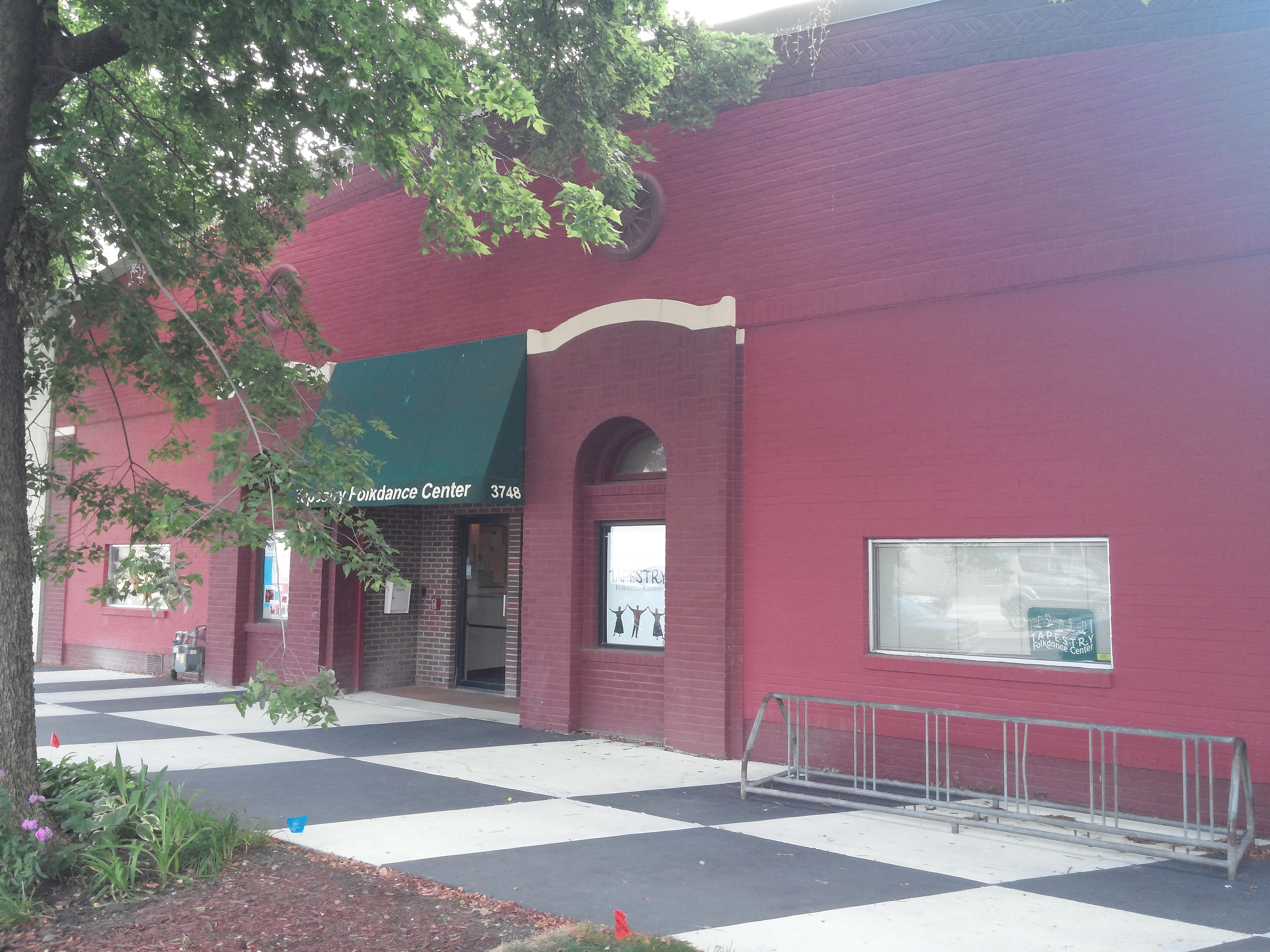
- Tapestry's facade in 2016
- Interactive map of Tapestry Folkdance Center
- Address: 3748 Minnehaha Avenue South; Minneapolis, Minnesota; US
- Coordinates: 44.9346438°N 93.2248327°W
- Type: Dance center
- Event: Folk dance

Construction
- Opened: 16 October 1999

Website
- tapestryfolkdance.org

Tapestry Folkdance Center is a non-profit dance venue in Minneapolis, Minnesota, dedicated to folk dances. Founded in 1983, the organization inhabited rented spaces until 1999 when it purchased a permanent home on Minnehaha Avenue. Tapestry offers a variety of dances including swing, contra, Bollywood, and Romani.

== History ==
Tapestry Folkdance Center was formed in 1983 by a group of dancers who had previously danced together at the Saltari Folkdance Emporium in the late 1970s. The group held folkdance lessons and gatherings in rented spaces throughout Minneapolis including their first in Dinkytown at the former Marshall University High School building. They began to dance at Sabathani Community Center in 1990. In November 1998, Tapestry's rent was scheduled to triple at Sabathani, forcing the organization to consider acquiring its own permanent space.

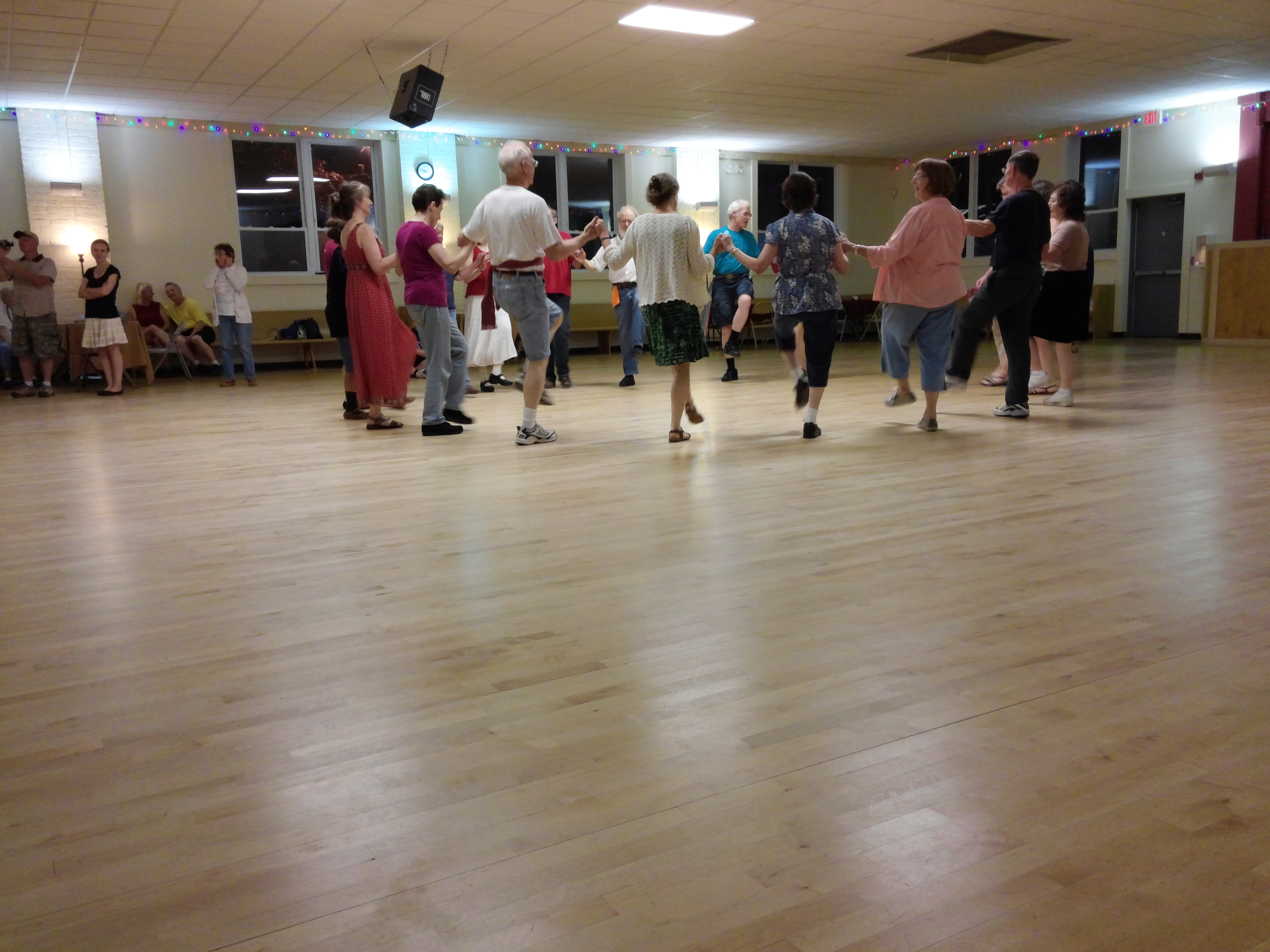
Tapestry Folkdance Center in 2014

Tapestry Folkdance Center purchased an abandoned structure, the Clayhill Simmer Building, at 3748 Minnehaha Avenue South in Minneapolis in May 1999. The building, which Tapestry's Board president Lisa Strong had observed was for sale while riding her bike, cost $270,000 which was paid for with funds from hundreds of donors. Before housing an air compressor assembly, the building served as a car dealership, evidenced by Ford Model T wheels etched into its exterior. Renovation of the space took place during the summer months of that year and was conducted by over 120 volunteers who collectively spent over 2,000 hours working on the project. Repairing and altering the building to suit Tapestry's needs cost $300,000 which executive director Beth Hennessy characterized as "a leap of faith" considering the organization's budget of under $100,000. Alterations made to the structure included the installation of wooden dance floors and an electrical sound system, the addition of a new HVAC system, and construction of a lounge, offices, and classrooms. A grand opening with a ribbon-cutting ceremony was held on October 16, 1999. Shortly after opening, attendance at the new space was 160, higher than the 85–100 dancers who typically danced with the group at Sabathani.

== Programming and operations ==
Tapestry offers lessons in and gatherings for Scandinavian dance, swing dance, English country dance, contra dance, Bollywood dance, and Romani dance. Dance events tend to include a lesson during the half hour before the dance begins and many of the dances are called. The space is rented by outside organizations for meetings, dance rehearsals, and music lessons. City Pages named Tapestry the best place to learn to dance in the Minneapolis–Saint Paul area in 2000 and 2001.

Tapestry is a non-profit organization sustained via membership. As of 2015, the center had approximately 350 members who served on a volunteer basis as planners for the center's dancer, ticket-takers, and fund-raisers. In 2015, Tapestry was led by executive director Mary Cummings. The current executive director is Sherisa Oie.
