= Twin Cities Hardingfelelag =

Twin Cities Hardingfelelag is an amateur folk music group in the Twin Cities, United States, specializing in Norwegian folk music played on the Hardingfele.

== Background ==
At its beginnings in 1996 as one of only two regional Hardanger Fiddle clubs in the U.S., the Twin Cities Hardingfelelag has drawn its members from all ability levels, from beginners to persons with classical violin background. It provides dance music at Scandinavian dances and events in the Twin Cities of Minneapolis/St. Paul and greater Minnesota such as: Scandinavian Ball, Syttende Mai Festival, Norway Day, Nisswa-Stämman Scandinavian Folkmusic Festival, Minneapolis Arts Festival, (Paynesville, MN) Ethnic Festival. In May 2005 the group was featured on the Norwegian NRK radio program “Alltid Folkemusikk”. In June 2006 the group made its first trip to Beitostølen, Norway to participate in the annual "Landskappleik", a competition in dance and Hardanger fiddle.

The Twin Cities Hardingfelelag plays gammaldans and bydgedans music from Norway - dance music with asymmetric rhythms. Their repertoire includes tunes in many folk music dance styles including valdresspringar, telespringar, vals, pols, gangar, reinlender, rudl and bruremarsj.

The Twin Cities Hardingfelelag was founded by Norwegian master fiddler Olav Jørgen Hegge.
