= Twin Township =

Twin Township may refer to:

- Twin Township, Darke County, Ohio
- Twin Township, Preble County, Ohio
- Twin Township, Ross County, Ohio
