= Cândido Godói =

Municipality of Rio Grande do Sul, Brazil

- Municipality
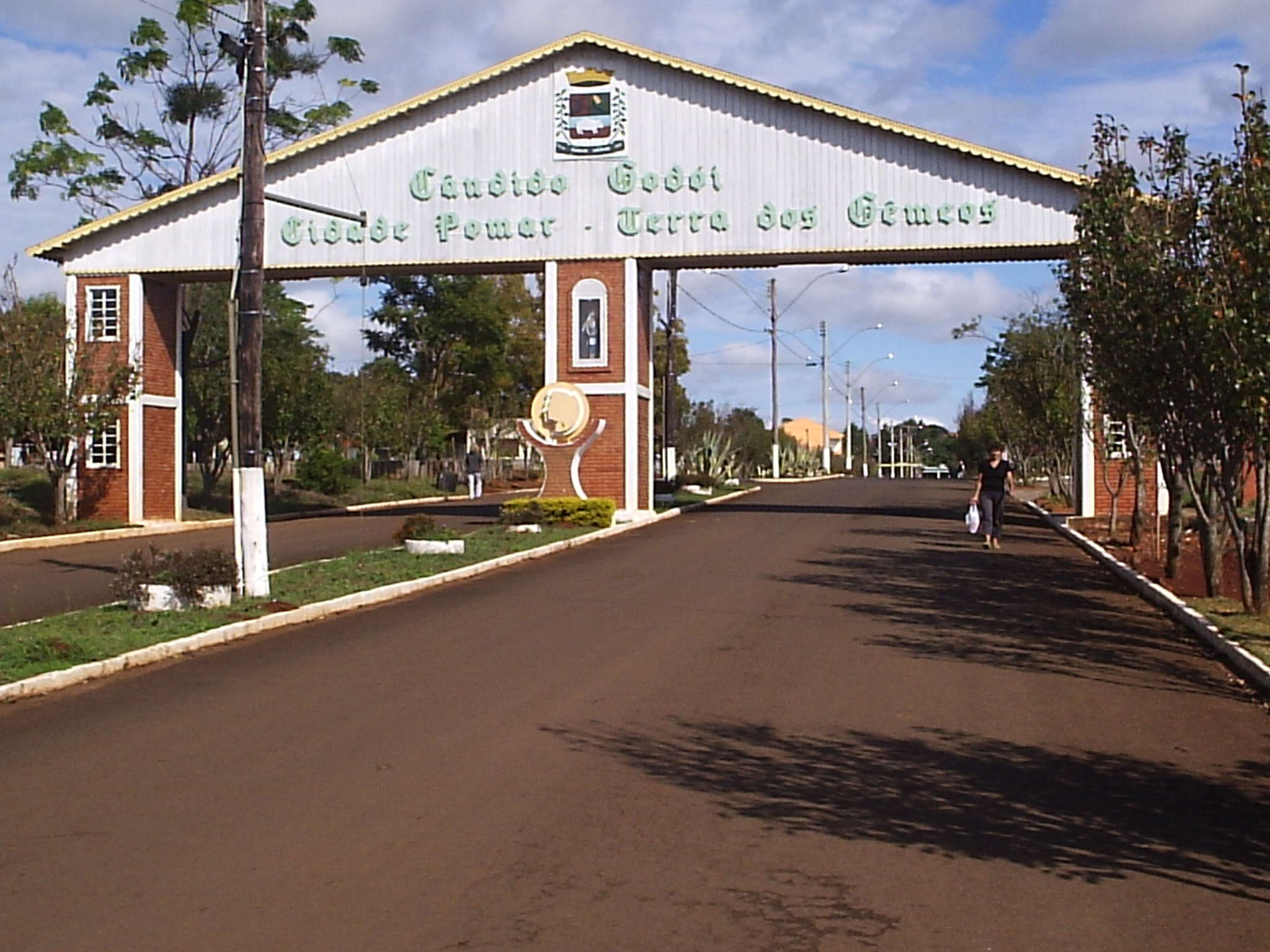

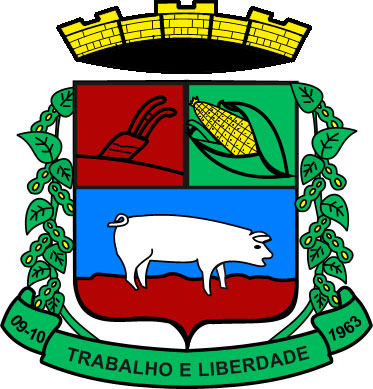
- Flag Coat of arms
- Nickname: Terra dos Gêmeos (Land of Twins)
- Motto: Trabalho e Liberdade (Work and Freedom)
- Location in Rio Grande do Sul, Brazil
- Coordinates: 27°57′S 54°46′W
- Country: Brazil
- Region: South
- State: Rio Grande do Sul
- Founded: September 10, 1963

Government
  - Mayor: Valdi Luis Goldschmidt (PMDB)

Area
  - Total: 246.275 km^{2} (95.087 sq mi)
- Elevation: 322 m (1,056 ft)

Population (2022)
  - Total: 6,294
  - Estimate (2025): 6,419
  - Density: 25.48/km^{2} (66.0/sq mi)
- Time zone: UTC−3 (BRT)

Cândido Godói (Portuguese pronunciation: [ˈkɐ̃dʒidu gɔˈdɔj]) is a municipality of 6,294 inhabitants in the state of Rio Grande do Sul, Brazil near the Argentine border, famous for the high number of twins born there. The twin phenomenon is centered in Linha São Pedro, a small settlement in the city of Cândido Godói, in an ethnically homogeneous population of German descent.

== Twinning rate ==
The rate of twin births in Cândido Godói is 10%, significantly higher than the overall 1.8% rate for the state of Rio Grande do Sul. This rate is unusual, exceeding the highest observed national twinning rate (4.5 to 5% for southwestern Nigeria). Nearly half (8 of 17) of twins examined in one study were monozygotic (identical) twins, a few more than the average of 30%. Twin births were noted from the early twentieth century, when the first immigrants included seventeen sets of twins, and have been observed through several generations in the latter part of the twentieth century.

The population is largely of Polish or German ancestry, with many tracing ancestry to the Hunsrück region of Germany, which has a higher than average twinning rate. The rate in Cândido Godói could reflect genetic founder effect: rare genetic traits occurring by chance among a small group founding a community will be more common among their descendants than in the population at large.

=== Explanation attempts ===
The notorious Nazi doctor Josef Mengele, who had conducted twin "studies" in Germany and experiments with twins in Auschwitz, is known to have fled to South America as the Allies were closing in on the Nazi German regime. The Argentine historian Jorge Camarasa has suggested that Mengele conducted experiments on women in the area, which could be responsible for the high ratio of twins. According to some commentators, about the time of Mengele's arrival in southern Brazil in 1963, the incidence of twins began to increase, allegedly leading to the current rate of twinning at 1 in 10, over half of whom are dizygotic (fraternal). However, such speculation has been disputed by local historian Paulo Sauthier, who says Mengele did not study twins during his time in Brazil. Moreover, according to geneticists, the most likely explanation for the high frequency of twins is genetic isolation and inbreeding. Records indicate that the high frequency of twins predates Mengele's arrival to South America.

This phenomenon of a large number of twin births is not unique to Cândido Godói, and has also been observed in the town of Igbo-Ora in Nigeria and the village of Kodinhi in India.

== See also ==
- List of municipalities in Rio Grande do Sul
- Riograndenser Hunsrückisch, the German dialect spoken locally; also the most widely spoken throughout the state
