= Igbo-Ora =

City and headquarters of Ibarapa Central, Oyo State, south-western Nigeria

Coordinates: 7.434°N 3.285°E

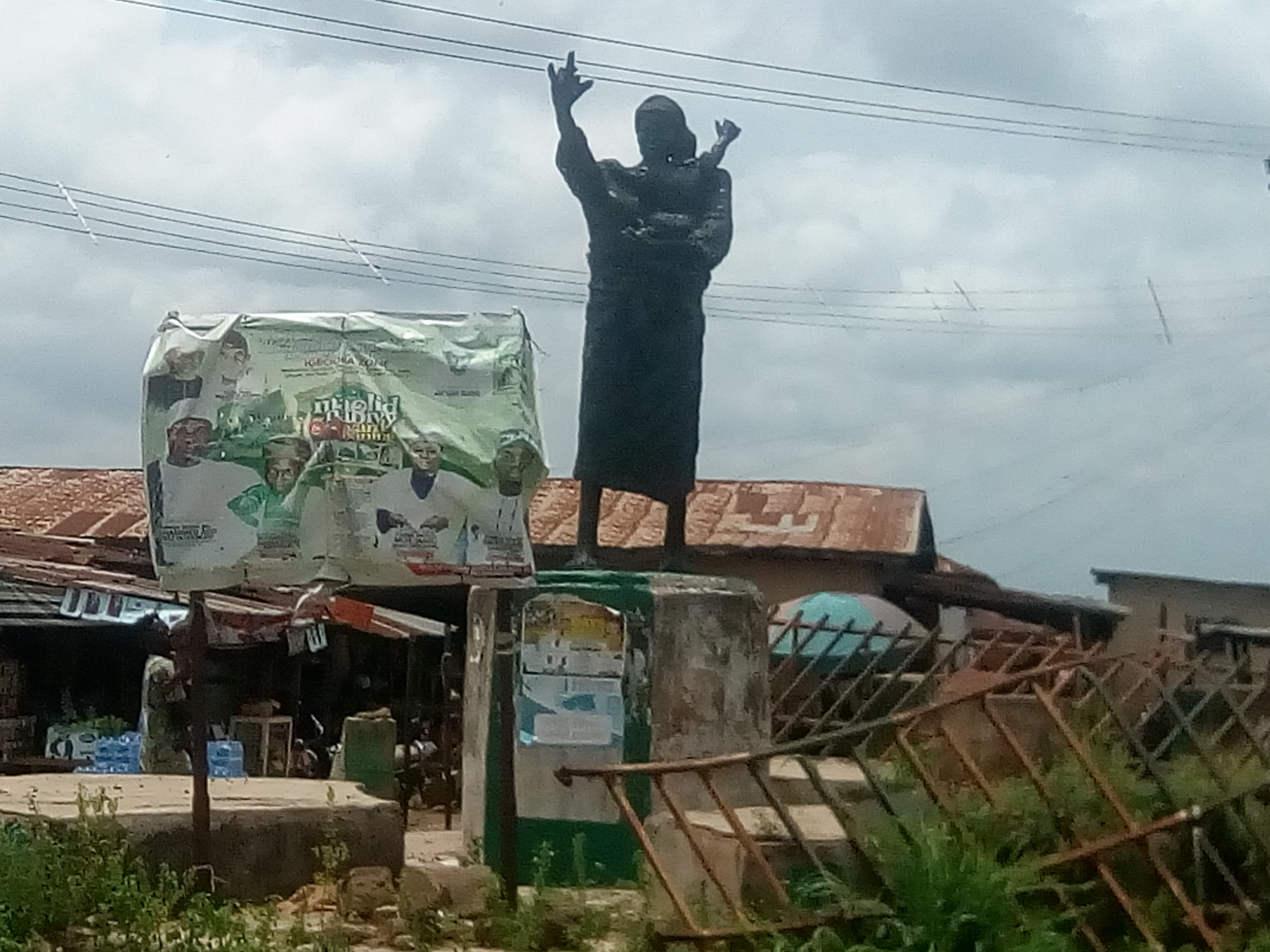
- Interactive map of Igbo-Ora

Igbo-Ora is a town and the headquarters of Ibarapa Central, Oyo State, south-western Nigeria, situated 80 kilometres (50 mi) north of Lagos. In 2006 the population of the town was approximately 72,207 people. In 2017 the population is estimated to be around 278,514 people.

The town is the location of Oyo State College of Agriculture and Technology. The College has contributed significantly to the socio-economic and demographic development of the town. The Oyo state government has, according to the Nigerian Tribune news on November 22, 2022, approved a High Court of Justice. The federal government is also said to have approved the location of a police training college in the town.

== Twins ==
The unusually large number of twin births in the region has earned the town the nickname Twin Capital of the World. This phenomenon of a large number of twin births is not unique to Igbo-Ora; it has also been observed in the town of Kodinhi in India, and Cândido Godói in Brazil. In Igbo-Ora, research has suggested that the multiple births could be related to the eating habits of the women in the region. Though no direct relation between dietary intake and twin births has been proven, a research study carried out at the University of Lagos Teaching Hospital has suggested that a chemical found in Igbo-Ora women and the peelings of a widely consumed tuber (yams) could be responsible.

A possible explanation that the large number of twins being born here could simply be a matter of genetics.

== History ==
Short oral history of Igbo-Ora by a native speaker

Obe Alade, a descendant of Alaafin of Oyo with his family migrated from Oyo town several centuries ago following a chieftaincy tussle and when he and his kinsmen lost the contest, (As usual in those days, once you lost any chieftaincy tussle, people tend to leave the town). While coming from Oyo town, Obe Alade and his kinsmen came with idols mainly Egungun and Alaale which they worshiped.

=== First Settlement ===
Obe Alade and his family first settled at a forest name after them, a forest of immigrant (Awon to sako wa lati Oyo). Igbo-Asako, about three kilometers away from the present-day Igbo-Ora market.

It was at Igbo-Asako that Obe Alade became the first Baale of Igbo-Ora (Now Olu of Igbo-ora) as usual for a founder, hence the appellation “Omo Igbo-Ora Lasako”. The scarcity of drinking water and mosquitoes’ bites drove out the Igbo-Ora people From Igbo-Asako forest.

Hence the appellation “Bi o ri emo ri, ki o nso ni Igbo-Ora Lasko, abongangan ibr ju esi ode lo, yanmuyanmu ibe ju ikamudu” meaning “If you want trouble, go to Igbo-Ora in Asako where mosquitoes are as big as hunter flies and bigger than other insects”.

=== Second Settlement ===
Due to unfavorable conditions, harsh weather and insect bites, they left Igbo-Asako. Igbo-Ora people now found another site called Igbo-Ayin near Ayin river and they settled there. They relied on this Ayin river for drinking water and other domestic purposes. There is a flat rock, and on that rock, they established a big market called “Apata Itaja” Market.

=== Third Settlement (Last Settlement) ===
The Igbo-Ora people left Igbo Ayin to find another forest which was in a marshy and swampy area (“Ira”) an unseasonal river called Igbo-Ira (Igbo inu Ira) and the present site. It is here the town derived its name when people refer to the people of the settlement as Omo Igbo-Ira later it was shortened as Igbo-Ora.

At each of the above settlements people name the town with a prefix of the forest:

1. Igbo-Asako
2. Igbo-Ayin
3. Igbo-Ora

This led to the appellation they gave to the people “Omo Igbo-Ora Lasako” in other to link them with their Original settlement.

== Economy ==
The main economic activity in Igbo-Ora is farming. Obasanjo Farms is one of the major mechanized farms and engages in poultry, cash crops, and fishery. Subsistence agriculture and hunting are other economic activities practised there. Service-based industries include two banks, the Owotutu line of businesses, and NITEL sub-station. Most salaried jobs revolve around teaching, local government employment, and a few private businesses. The West-North Abeokuta-Sokoto highway, which pass through the town, serves as a potential link to economic prosperity.

== Administration ==
Igbo-Ora is the Headquarters of Ibarapa Central local government, comprising Igbo-Ora and Idere. It has 7 wards, while Idere has 3. The community could not benefit from the recent initiative of the Oyo State Government to create additional council administrations (LCDA), since the community voted no to such initiative during the Local Council Referendum by the Lam Adeshina administration.

== Traditional rulers ==
Igboora is a collection of autonomous towns each with its traditional heads, but with very porous land boundaries. The names of all the Oba & Baales in Igboora:

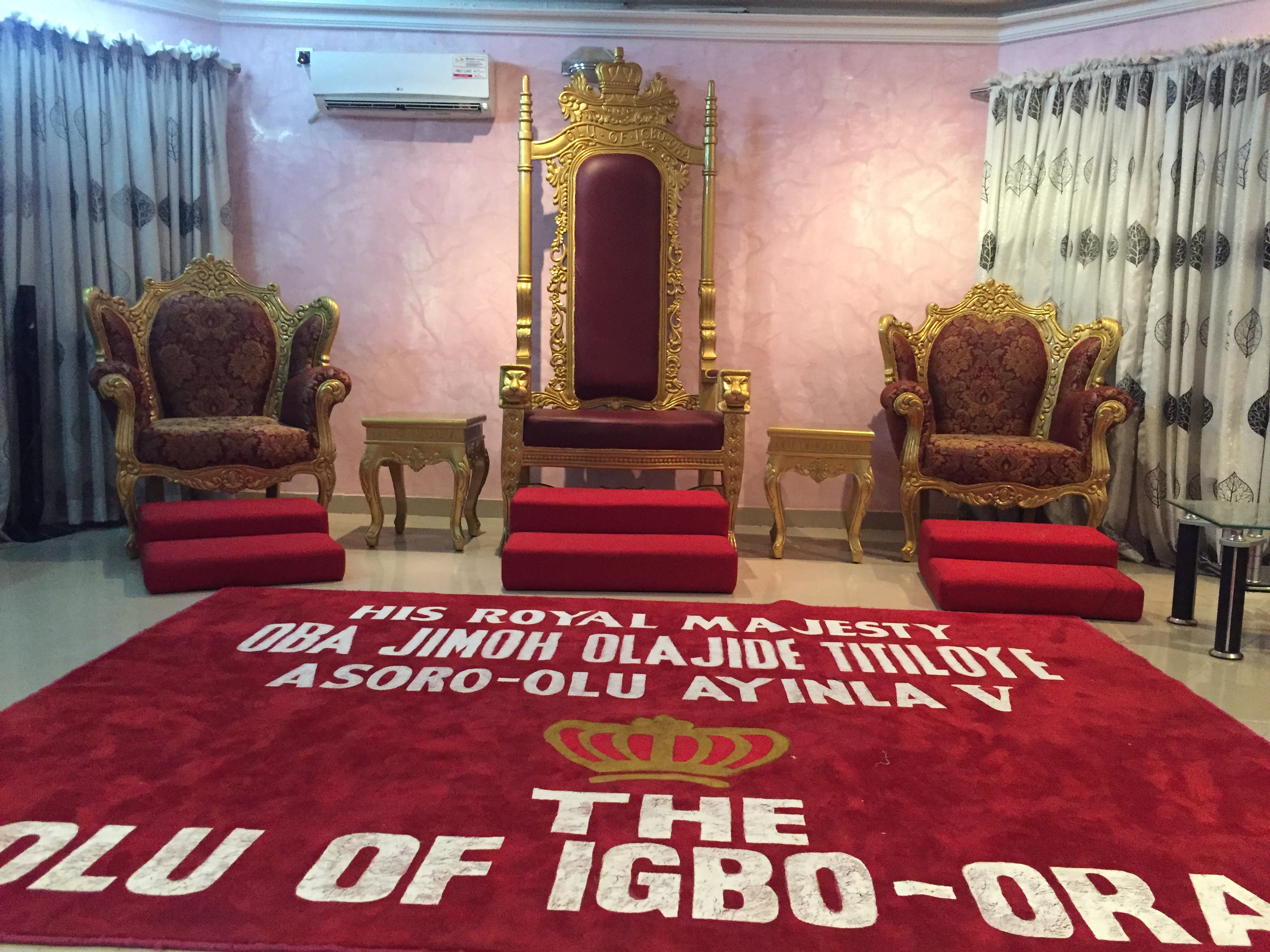
The palace of the 13th Olu of Igboora-land, The Ayinla Asoro-Olu V, Oba Jimoh Olajide Titiloye

1. Oba Jimoh Olajide Titiloye, Asoro-olu Ayinla V, Olu of Igboora Land.
2. Jamiu Adedamola Badmus (JP) (JP), Ayeleso III, Olu-Aso of Iberekodo, Igbo-Ora
3. (MSA) Joshua Olusanjo Ojo (JP), Lagbaaju IV, Baba-Aso of Iberekodo-Igbole, Igbo-Ora.
4. (ALH) Jinadu Adekunle Fasasi (JP), Baabani IV, Onisagan-un of Sagan-un, Igbo-Ora.
5. Samuel Adewuyi Adeleye (JP), Olaribigbe IV, Onidofin of Idofin, Igbo-Ora.
6. Late Lamidi Olayide Akinyemi, Iwolafisagba III, Onipako of Pako, Igbo-Ora.
7. Late Mosun Oladokun, The Bansa ofIgbo-Ora.

== Olu of Igbo-ora land ==
=== Ruling House/Family in Igbo-ora ===
The Asoro-Olu and Ota-Obola families are the only two families that can produce the Baale (Olu) of Igbo-ora, they have been in Igbo-Ile, Igbo-Ora as land owners and occupants in the third settlement, before Lajorun a ubiquitous hunter and an Oro worshiper came from Ikole-Ekiti to Abeokuta and from there to Fedegbo which after he settled down at Igbo-Ile, Igbo-Ora. The Asoro-Olu family and Ota-Obala family have been ruling before the arrival of Lajorun from Fedegbo.

Olayemi Akano, the son of Oladibu Adio was then on the throne as Baale of Igbo-Ora when Lajorun came from Fedego and settle in Igbo-Ile.

It was at Ibara-Orile in Abeokate that Lajorun married Olupeti, the daughter of OMO-OSO and brought her to Igbo-Ora. The marriage produced three children:

Lajorun was never Baale of Igbo-Ora (Olu of Igbo-Ora) and its false and misleading to say he founded Igbo-Ora, when Igbo-Ora had already been in existence before his arrival and he only has a tint connection through Bankole Ota-Obala, his grandson who was mothered by his daughter Omoyele and fathered by Olayemi Akano the son of Oladibu Adio.

The Asoro-Olu family and Atanbala family are the only royal family in Igbo-Ora as contained in Justice Adenekan Ademola Chieftaincy review commission Report and the Government Decisions thereon in pages 56–58, 1976.

Asoro-Olu Ayinla ruling house have produced six Baales of Igb-Ora (Olu of Igbo-Ora Land) to the throne. They are:

- Obe Alade – The founder of Igbo-Ora Lasako (Asoro-Olu Ayinla ruling house)
- Asoro-Olu Ayinla (a.k.a. Arojojoye) (Asoro-Olu Ayinla ruling house)
- Erubami Ishola (Asoro-Olu Ayinla ruling house)
- Oyekannmi Ayinde (Asoro-Olu Ayinla ruling house)
- Adefemi Akanmu Erubami II (1932-1940) (Asoro-Olu Ayinla ruling house)
- Jimoh Olajide Titiloye (2019–current). (Asoro-Olu Ayinla ruling house)

Atanbala ruling house have produced seven Baales of Igb-Ora (Olu of Igbo-Ora Land) to the throne. They are:

- Oladibu Adio (Atanbala ruling house)
- Olayemi Akano (Atanbala ruling house)
- Bankole Otaobala (Atanbala ruling house)
- Ajayi Baale Agba (1870–1921, Atanbala ruling house)
- Ayerina Akande (1923–1931, Atanbala ruling house)
- Adeoye Alamo (1941–1975, Atanbala ruling house)
- Jacob Oyerogba (1975–2018, Atanbala ruling house)- Gbadewolu I, Olu of Igbo-Ora.

The order of the Their Reign as Baale (Olu) of Igbo-ora is:

- Obe Alade – The founder of Igbo-Ora Lasako (Asoro-Olu Ayinla ruling house) - Baale
- Oladibu Adio (Atanbala ruling house) - Baale
- Asoro-Olu Ayinla (a.k.a. Arojojoye, Asoro-Olu Ayinla ruling house) - Baale
- Olayemi Akano (Atanbala ruling house) - Baale
- Bankole Otaobala (Atanbala ruling house) - Baale
- Erubami Ishola (Asoro-Olu Ayinla ruling house) - Baale
- Oyekannmi Ayinde (Asoro-Olu Ayinla ruling house) - Baale
- Ajayi Baale Agba (1870–1921, Atanbala ruling house) - Baale
- Ayerina Akande (1923–1931, Atanbala ruling house) - Baale
- Adefemi Akanmu Erubami II (1932-1940, Asoro-Olu Ayinla ruling house) - Baale
- Adeoye Alamo (1941–1975, Atanbala ruling house) - Baale
- Jacob Oyerogba (1975–2018, Atanbala ruling house) - Gbadewolu I, Olu of Igbo-Ora
- Jimoh Olajide Titiloye (2019–current, Asoro-Olu Ayinla ruling House) Olu of Igbo-Ora.

=== Oba Jimoh Olajide, Titiloye (Asoorolu Ayinla V) ===
Oba Jimoh Olajide, Titiloye was born August 4, 1961, to the family of Pa Titiloye Alliu Bamigbose of Asoro-Olu Ruling house, Oke Iserin, Igbo-Ora and Titilayo Ashiawu Agbeke of Olukosi compound of Iberekodo, Igbo-ora in Ibarapa Central Local government, Oyo State.

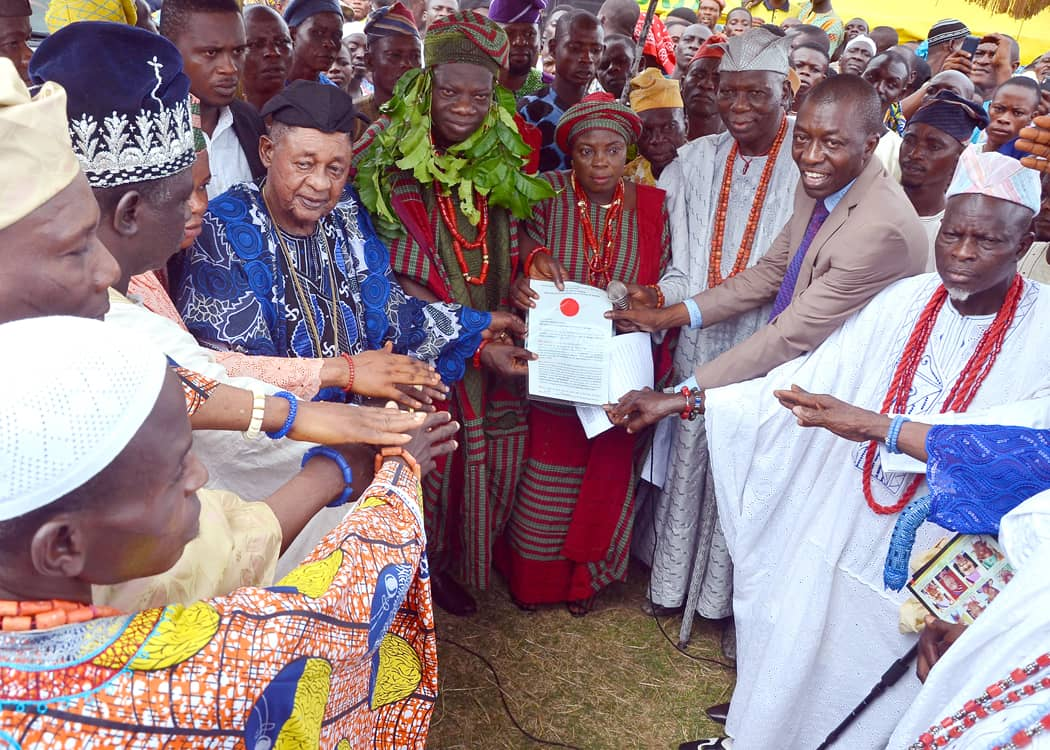
The Newly installed Olu of Igboora, Oba Jimoh Olajide Titiloye of the Asoorolu Ruling house Igboora

==== Family ====
OBA Jimoh is the first male child of his parents. He is married and has two children; male and female of which Taiwo and Kehinde Titiloye are twins.

==== Education and Professional Qualifications ====
He started elementary education in Igbo-Ora where he attended Nawal-Ud-Deen Primary School, Igbo-Ora, and Methodist Modern School, Igbo-Ora. He later proceeded to Government Technical College, Ayetoro, and The Polytechnic, Ibadan, Esa-Oke Campus. He obtained a B.Sc degree in Industrial Technical Education from University of Nigeria, Nsukka, and a Master of Business Administration with specialization in International Business Management from Lagos State University, Ojoo, Lagos. He is a member of Institute of purchasing and supply management of Nigeria and a technical consultant trained both locally and abroad.

==== Nomination ====
He was selected among princes that were also heir to the throne in November 2018. He is best described as a distinct character dedicated to the peaceful co-existence of humans. He is God fearing.

== Post Secondary Institution ==
- Oyo State College of Agriculture and Technology
