= Kodinhi =

- Nickname: Twin Town
- Location in Kerala, India Kodinhi (India)
- Coordinates: 11.013°N 75.907°E
- Country: India
- State: Kerala
- District: Malappuram
- Elevation: 1,000 m (3,300 ft)

Languages
  - Official: Malayalam, English
- Time zone: UTC+5:30 (IST)
- Postal code: 676309

Kodinhi (Malayalam: [koɖiɲːi]) is a village in Malappuram district in Kerala, India. The village is situated close to the town of Tirurangadi and, as of 2008, is home to around 2,000 families. Administered by the Nannambra panchayat, the village came to international attention for the unusually large number of multiple births in the region, especially twins, although India has one of the lowest twinning rates in the world. The first association of twins in the country, The Twins and Kins Association, was also founded in the village.

== Geography ==
The village is situated around 35 kilometres (22 mi) south of Calicut and 30 kilometres (19 mi) west of Malappuram, the district headquarters. The village is surrounded by backwaters on all sides but one, which connects it to the town of Tirurangadi.

== Culture and demographics ==
As of November 2008, the population of the village was estimated at 2,000 families. A majority of the residents are Sunni Muslim, and follow the Shafi school of thought. A significant Salafi Muslim and Hindu minorities also resides here.

=== Twin births ===
In the early 2000s, local surveys indicated an unusually high rate of twin births in the village. The actual number of twin pairs in Kodinhi is now estimated to be over 400–450 pairs of twins among approximately 2,000 families—this is much higher than previously reported, and the phenomenon is ongoing with more twins being born every year. Women from Kodinhi married off to far away places are also known to give birth to twins. According to doctors this phenomenon is due to chemicals present in water in the Kodinhi area. According to locals, the oldest known twin pair in the village was born in 1949. The number of twin births in Kodinhi has been increasing over the years, with surveys showing over 79 pairs of twins within the age group of 0–10 years.

This phenomenon of a large number of twin births is not unique to Kodinhi, and has also been observed in the town of Igbo-Ora in Nigeria. In Igbo-Ora, research has suggested that the multiple births could be related to the eating habits of the women in the region. Though no direct correlation between dietary intake and twin births has been observed, a research study carried out at the University of Lagos Teaching Hospital has suggested that a chemical found in the Igbo-Ora women and the peelings of a widely consumed tuber could account for the high level of multiple births. In the case of Kodinhi, however, no such relationship has been observed, as the residents' dietary patterns are not known to be significantly different from the rest of Kerala.

A similar phenomenon of a large number of twin births within a small isolated community has been observed in Cândido Godói, Brazil.

In 2008, around 30 pairs of twins from Kodinhi, along with their parents, got together to form The Twins and Kins Association, the first such association of twins in India. The forum, according to its founders, aims to bring to wider attention problems peculiar to people of multiple births, such as those concerning their education and health.

== Transportation ==
Kodinhi village connects to other parts of India through Parappanangadi town. National highway No.66 passes through Ramanattukara and the northern stretch connects to Goa and Mumbai. The southern stretch connects to Cochin and Trivandrum. State Highway No.28 starts from Nilambur Ooty, Mysore and Bangalore through Highways.12,29 and 181. The nearest airport is at Kozhikode. The nearest major railway station are Parappanangadi, Tanur and Tirur.
