= List of Saturday Night Live writers =

The following is a list of Saturday Night Live writers. The show, created by Lorne Michaels, is an American live sketch comedy and variety show. Airing since 1975, it has employed a large and changing staff of writers.

== Showrunner Credits ==
- Lorne Michaels (producer: seasons 1–5, 12, 21; executive producer: seasons 11, 13–20, 22–present) (Note: Michaels was credited as "producer" for the first five seasons. When he returned in season 11, he took an "executive producer" credit and delegated to newly minted producers Al Franken and Tom Davis. When that season wasn't received well, he took more hands-on approach to season 12 and returned to his producer credit for one season before resuming as an executive producer for the next several seasons. He did the same thing for the 21st season, another rebuilding season where he took a "producer" credit before resuming as an executive producer for the rest of the show's run.)
- Jean Doumanian (producer: season 6, episodes 1–12)
- Dick Ebersol (executive producer: season 6, episode 13, seasons 7–9)

== Season 1 (1975–76) ==
Producer
Lorne Michaels
Writing Supervised By
Michael O'Donoghue, Lorne Michaels (episode 1)
Chevy Chase, Lorne Michaels (episode 2)
Lorne Michaels, Rosie Shuster (episode 3)
Michael O'Donoghue, Herb Sargent (episode 4)
Script Consultant
Herb Sargent
Writing staff
- Anne Beatts
- Chevy Chase
- Tom Davis
- Al Franken
- Lorne Michaels
- Marilyn Suzanne Miller (episodes 6–24)
- Michael O'Donoghue
- Herb Sargent
- Tom Schiller
- Rosie Shuster
- Alan Zweibel

== Season 2 (1976–77) ==
Producer
Lorne Michaels
Script Consultant
Herb Sargent
Script Coordinator
Anne Beatts (episodes 6–22)
Writing staff
- Dan Aykroyd
- Anne Beatts
- John Belushi
- Chevy Chase (episodes 1–6)
- Tom Davis
- Jim Downey (episodes 11–22)
- Al Franken
- Bruce McCall (episodes 1–6)
- Lorne Michaels
- Marilyn Suzanne Miller
- Bill Murray (episodes 11–22)
- Michael O'Donoghue
- Herb Sargent
- Tom Schiller
- Rosie Shuster
- Alan Zweibel

== Season 3 (1977–78) ==
Producer
Lorne Michaels
Script Consultant
Herb Sargent
Writing staff
- Dan Aykroyd
- Anne Beatts
- Tom Davis
- Jim Downey
- Brian Doyle-Murray (episodes 9–20)
- Al Franken
- Neil Levy
- Lorne Michaels
- Marilyn Suzanne Miller
- Don Novello (episodes 9–20)
- Michael O'Donoghue
- Herb Sargent
- Tom Schiller
- Rosie Shuster
- Alan Zweibel

== Season 4 (1978–79) ==
Producer
Lorne Michaels
Script Consultant
Herb Sargent
Writing staff
- Dan Aykroyd
- Anne Beatts
- Tom Davis
- Jim Downey
- Brian Doyle-Murray
- Al Franken
- Brian McConnachie (episodes 3–20)
- Lorne Michaels
- Don Novello
- Herb Sargent
- Tom Schiller
- Rosie Shuster
- Walter Williams
- Alan Zweibel

== Season 5 (1979–80) ==
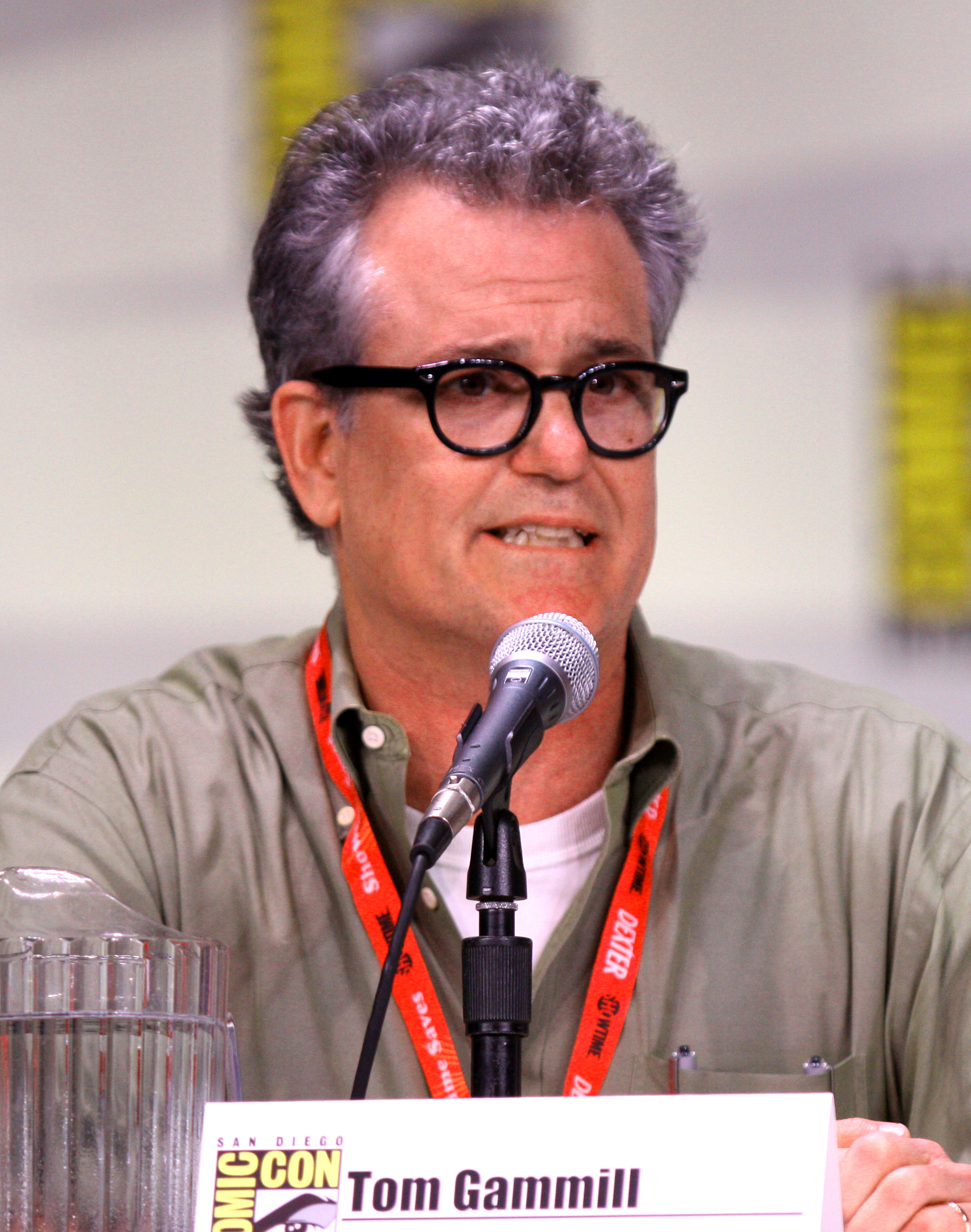
Writer Tom Gammill in 2011

Producer
Lorne Michaels
Script Consultant
Herb Sargent
Writing staff
- Peter Aykroyd
- Anne Beatts
- Tom Davis
- Jim Downey
- Brian Doyle-Murray (episodes 6–20)
- Al Franken
- Tom Gammill
- Lorne Michaels
- Matt Neuman
- Don Novello
- Sarah Paley
- Max Pross
- Herb Sargent
- Tom Schiller
- Harry Shearer
- Rosie Shuster
- Alan Zweibel

== Season 6 (1980–81) ==
Script Consultants/Script Supervisors (Head Writers)
Mason Williams (episodes 1–5), Jeremy Stevens and Tom Moore (episodes 6–12), Michael O'Donoghue and Bob Tischler (episode 13) (Note: The head writer positions this season change titles each time they change hands. Mason Williams is credited as "Script Consultant". Jeremy Stevens and Tom Moore are credited as "Script Supervisors." Michael O'Donoghue, at his insistence, is credited as "Reich Marshall," while Bob Tischler is credited as "Deputy Marshall.")
Writing staff
- Larry Arnstein (episodes 1–12)
- Barry W. Blaustein
- Billy Brown
- Ferris Butler (episodes 1–12)
- John DeBellis (episodes 1–12)
- Jean Doumanian (episodes 1–12)
- Nancy Dowd (episodes 1–2)
- Brian Doyle-Murray (episodes 1–12)
- Leslie Fuller (episodes 1–12)
- Mel Green
- David Hurwitz (episodes 1–12)
- Judy Jacklin (episode 13)
- Sean Kelly (episodes 1–2)
- Mitchell Kriegman (episodes 1–5)
- Patricia Marx
- Douglas McGrath
- Tom Moore
- Matt Neuman (episode 13)
- Pamela Norris
- Michael O'Donoghue (episode 13)
- Mark Reisman (episodes 11–13)
- David Sheffield
- Jeremy Stevens
- Terry Sweeney
- Bob Tischler (episode 13)
- Mason Williams (episodes 1–5)
- Dirk Wittenborn (episode 13)

== Season 7 (1981–82) ==
Supervising Producers (Head Writers)
Michael O'Donoghue (episodes 1–8) and Bob Tischler
Script Coordinators
Barry W. Blaustein and David Sheffield (episodes 13–20)
Writing staff
- Barry W. Blaustein
- Joe Bodolai
- Brian Doyle-Murray
- Nate Herman
- Tim Kazurinsky
- Nelson Lyon
- Marilyn Suzanne Miller (episodes 1–13)
- Pamela Norris (episodes 1–15)
- Mark O'Donnell
- Michael O'Donoghue (episodes 1–8)
- Margaret Oberman (episodes 14–20)
- Tony Rosato
- David Sheffield
- Rosie Shuster
- Andrew Smith (episodes 13–20)
- Terry Southern
- Bob Tischler
- Eliot Wald

== Season 8 (1982–83) ==
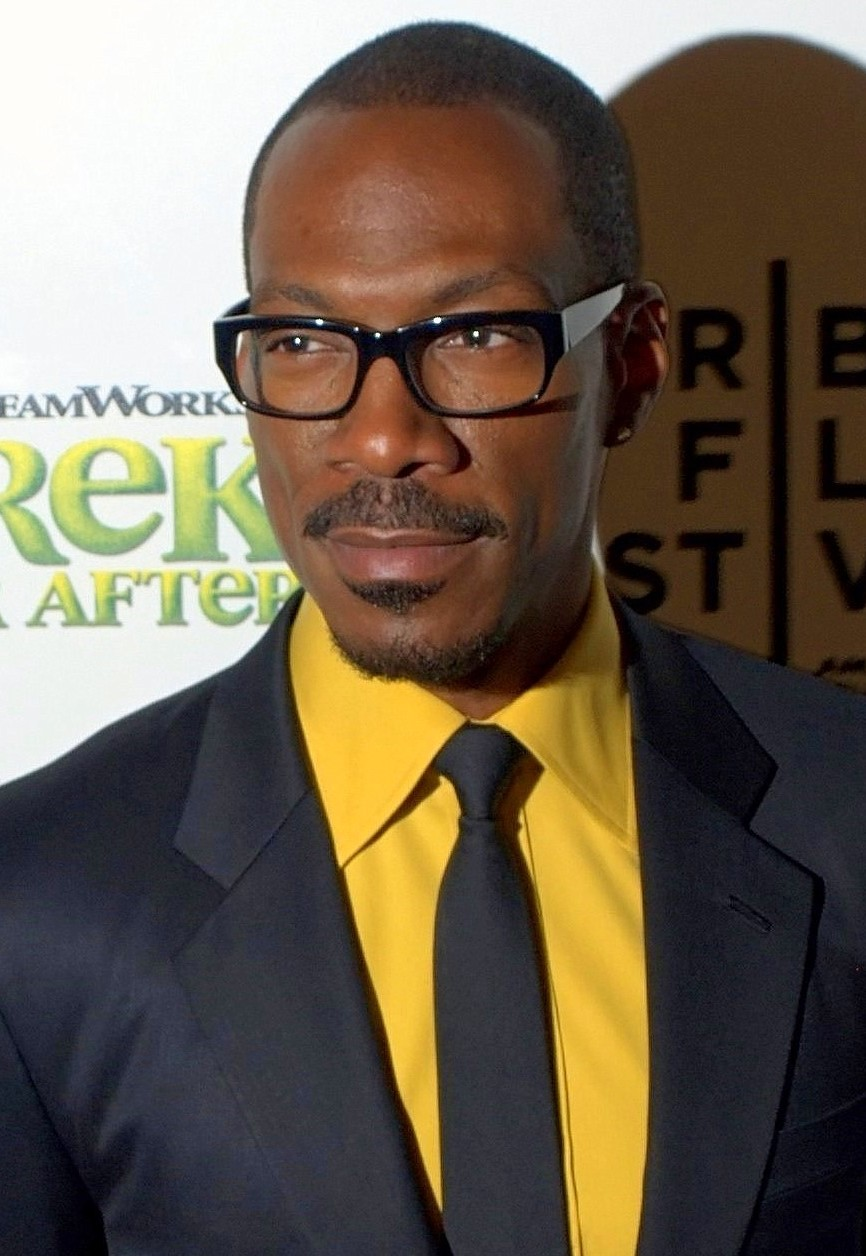
Eddie Murphy in 2010

Producer (Head Writer)
Bob Tischler
Supervising Producers
Barry W. Blaustein and David Sheffield
Writing staff
- Paul Barrosse
- Barry W. Blaustein
- Robin Duke
- Ellen L. Fogle
- Nate Herman
- Tim Kazurinsky
- Andy Kurtzman
- Eddie Murphy
- Pamela Norris (episodes 12–20)
- Margaret Oberman
- Joe Piscopo (episodes 3–20)
- David Sheffield
- Andrew Smith
- Bob Tischler
- Tracy Tormé (episodes 1–11)
- Eliot Wald

== Season 9 (1983–84) ==
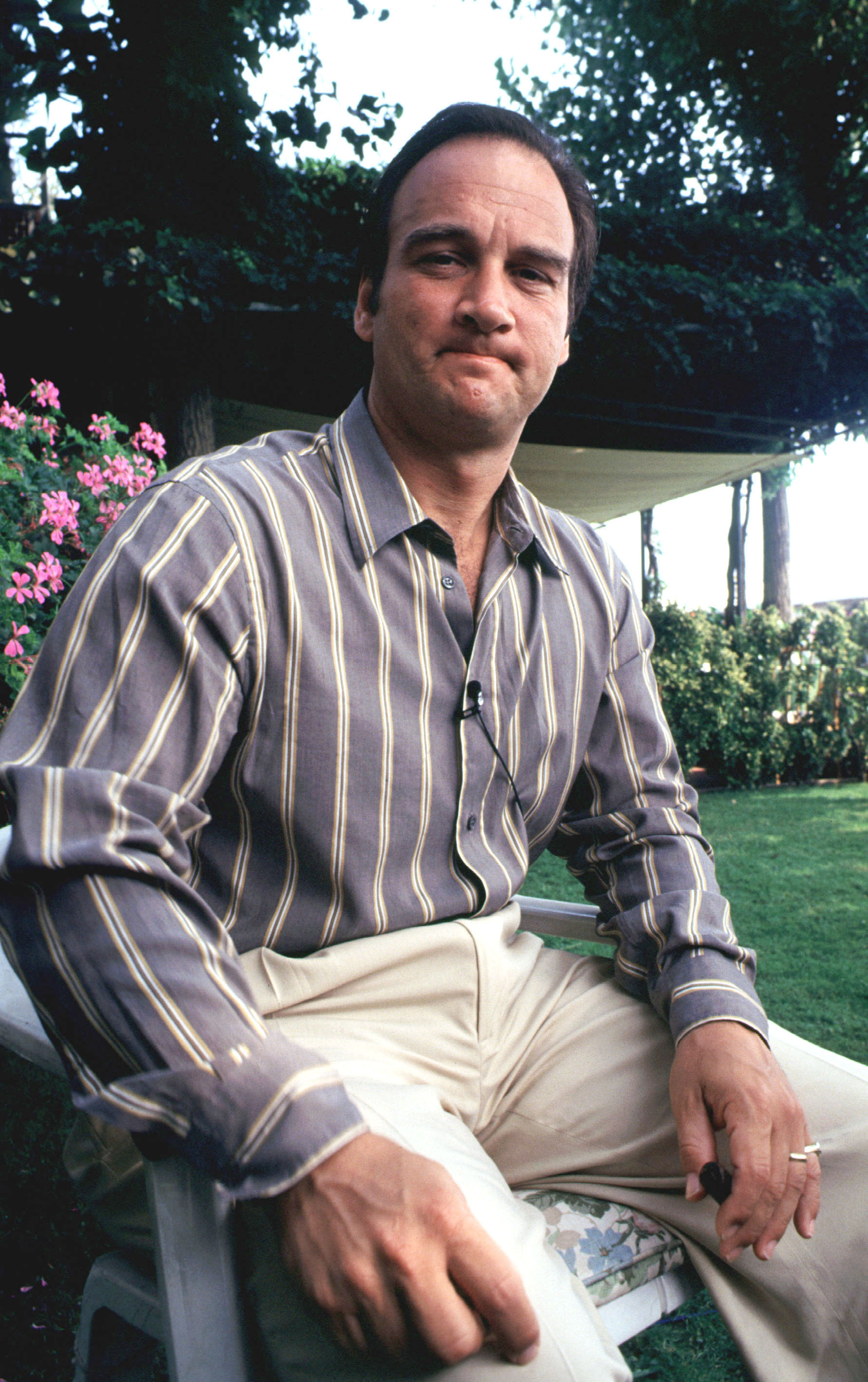
Jim Belushi in 1982

Producer (Head Writer)
Bob Tischler
Head Writer
Andrew Smith
Script Consultant
Herb Sargent (episodes 17–19)
Script Supervisor
Pamela Norris (episodes 6–19)
Writing staff
- Jim Belushi (episodes 3–19)
- Andy Breckman
- Robin Duke
- Adam Green
- Mary Gross
- Nate Herman
- Tim Kazurinsky
- Kevin Kelton
- Andy Kurtzman
- Michael McCarthy (episodes 4–19)
- Eddie Murphy (episodes 1–17)
- Pamela Norris
- Margaret Oberman (episodes 1–14)
- Joe Piscopo
- Herb Sargent (episodes 17–19)
- Andrew Smith
- Bob Tischler
- Eliot Wald

== Season 10 (1984–85) ==
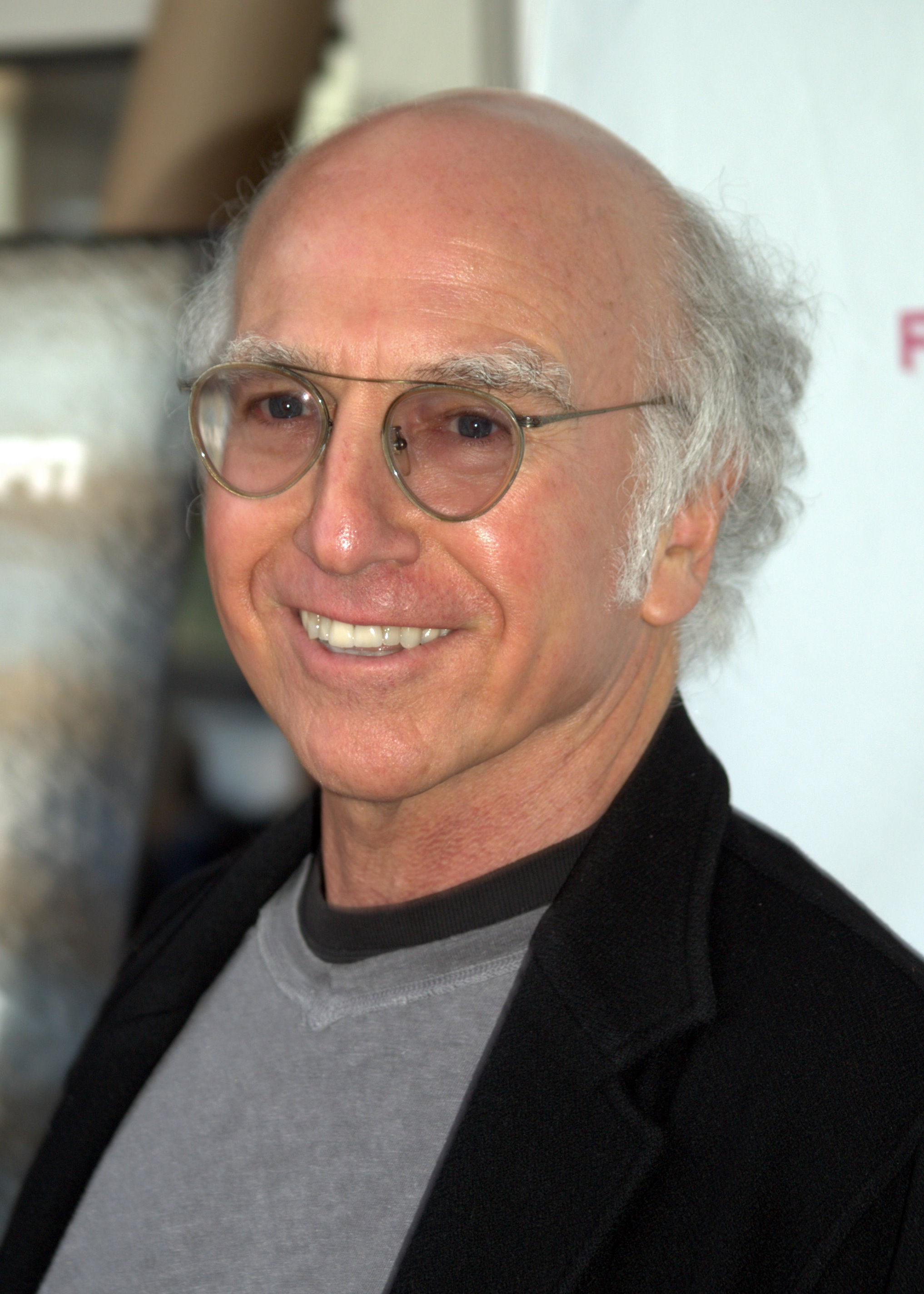
Writer Larry David in 2009

Producer (Head Writer)
Bob Tischler
Script Consultant
Herb Sargent
Writing staff
- Jim Belushi
- Andy Breckman
- Billy Crystal
- Larry David
- Jim Downey
- Christopher Guest
- Rich Hall
- Nate Herman
- Kevin Kelton
- Andy Kurtzman
- Rob Riley (episodes 4–17)
- Herb Sargent
- Harry Shearer (episodes 1–10)
- Martin Short
- Bob Tischler
- Eliot Wald

== Season 11 (1985–86) ==
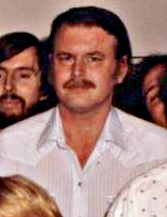
Writer John Swartzwelder in 1992

Producers
Al Franken and Tom Davis
Head Writer
Jim Downey
Script Consultant
Herb Sargent
Writing staff
- A. Whitney Brown
- Tom Davis
- James Downey
- Al Franken
- Jack Handey
- Lanier Laney
- Carol Leifer
- George Meyer
- Lorne Michaels
- Mark McKinney
- Bruce McCulloch
- Don Novello
- Michael O'Donoghue (episodes 1–4)
- R. D. Rosen (episodes 1–3)
- Herb Sargent
- Suzy Schneider (episodes 1–6)
- Robert Smigel
- John Swartzwelder
- Terry Sweeney

== Season 12 (1986–87) ==
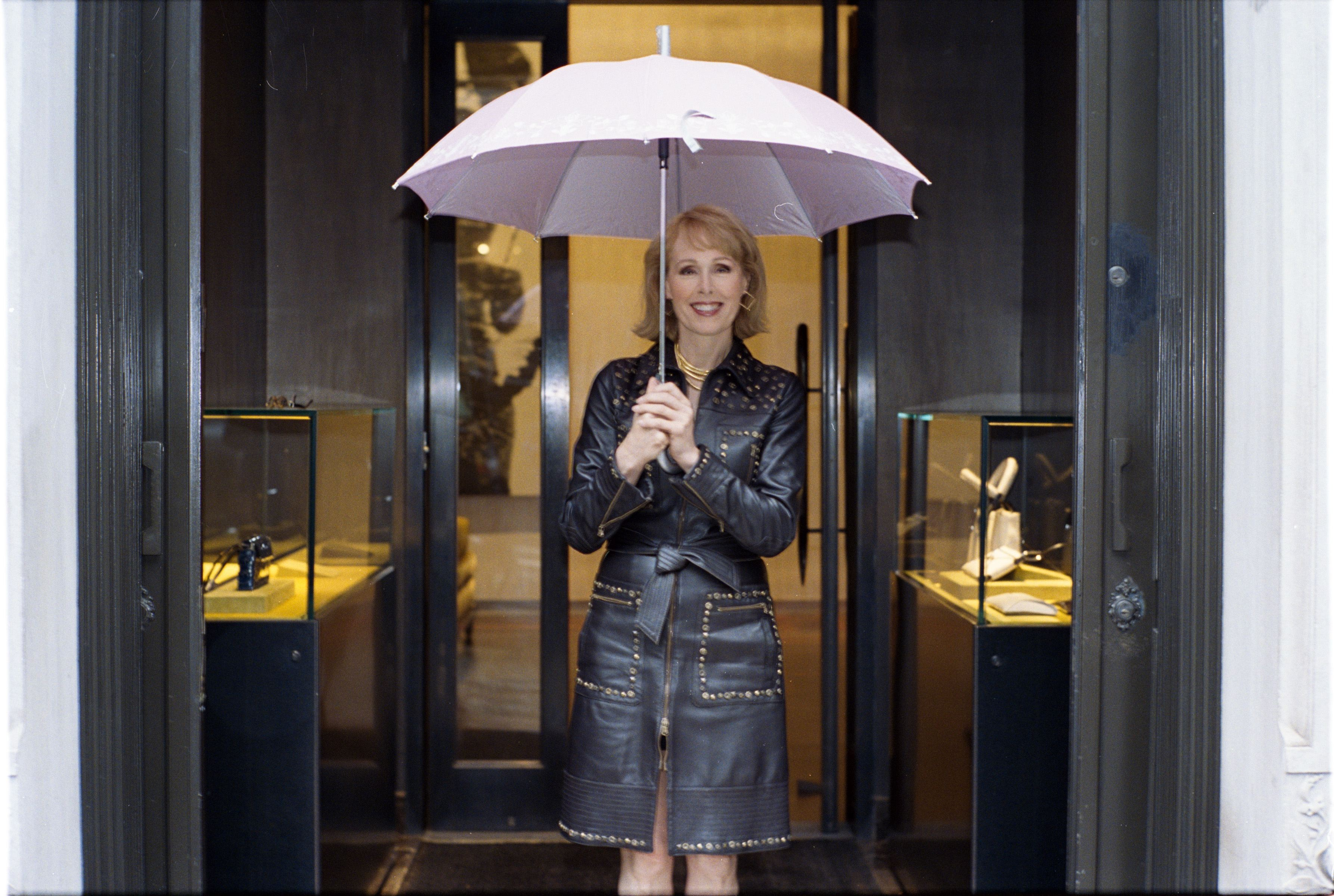
Writer E. Jean Carroll in 2006

Producer (Head Writer)
Jim Downey
Script Consultant
Herb Sargent
Writing staff
- Andy Breckman
- A. Whitney Brown
- E. Jean Carroll (episodes 1–8)
- Tom Davis (episodes 9–20)
- Jim Downey
- Al Franken
- Eddie Gorodetsky (episodes 4–20)
- Phil Hartman
- George Meyer
- Lorne Michaels
- Kevin Nealon
- Herb Sargent
- Marc Shaiman
- Rosie Shuster
- Robert Smigel
- Bonnie Turner (episodes 14–20)
- Terry Turner (episodes 14–20)
- Jon Vitti
- Christine Zander (episodes 9–20)

== Season 13 (1987–88) ==
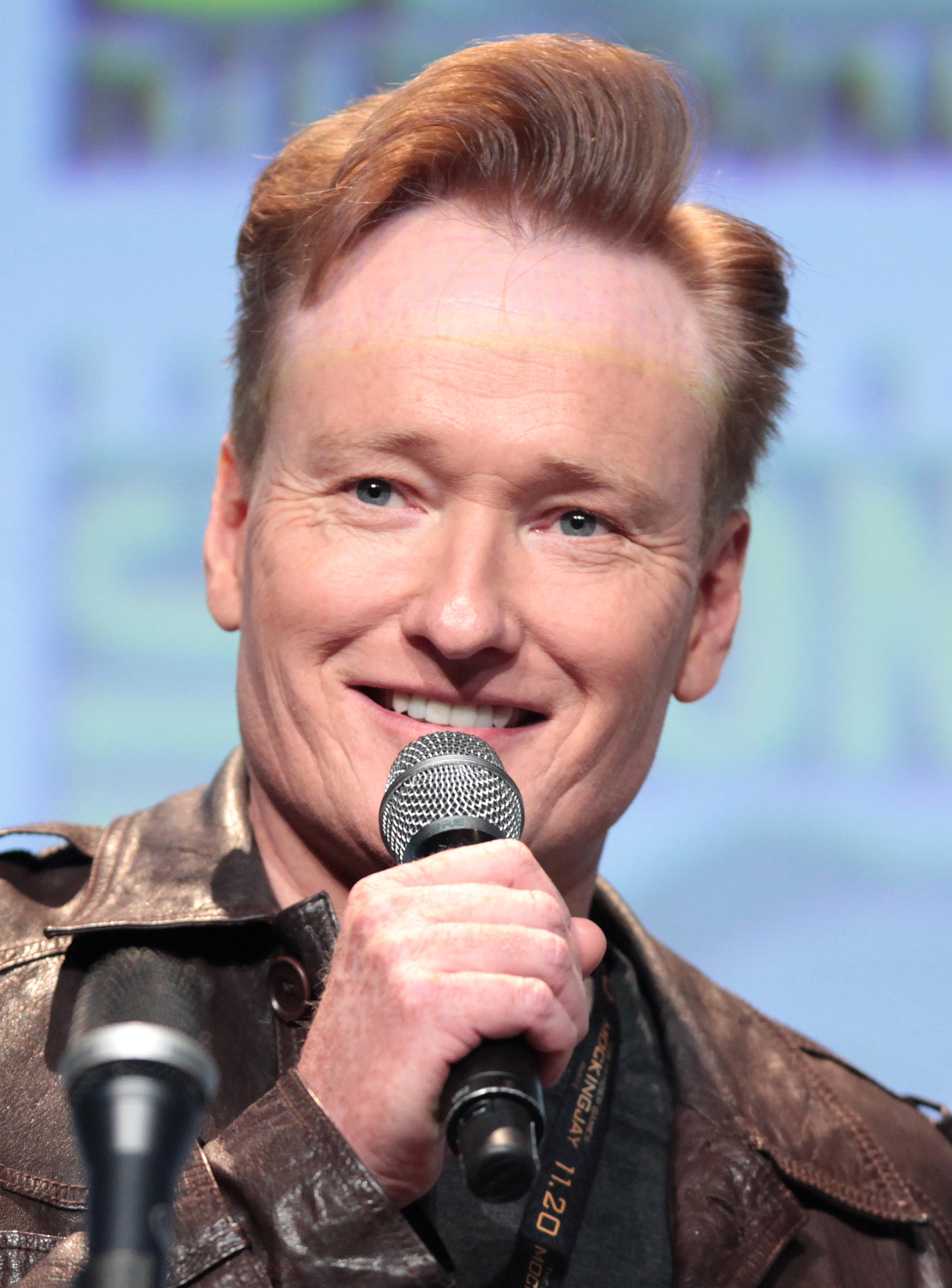
Conan O'Brien, who would later achieve large success on Late Night with Conan O'Brien and The Tonight Show with Conan O'Brien.

Producer (Head Writer)
Jim Downey
Script Consultant
Herb Sargent
Writing staff
- A. Whitney Brown
- Greg Daniels (episodes 11–13)
- Tom Davis
- Jim Downey
- Al Franken
- Shannon Gaughan (episode 13)
- Jack Handey
- Phil Hartman
- George Meyer (episodes 1–6)
- Lorne Michaels
- Conan O'Brien (episodes 11–13)
- Bob Odenkirk (episodes 6–13)
- Herb Sargent
- Rosie Shuster (episodes 3–5, 8)
- Robert Smigel
- Bonnie Turner
- Terry Turner
- Christine Zander

== Season 14 (1988–89) ==
Producer (Head Writer)
Jim Downey
Script Consultant
Herb Sargent
Creative Consultant (Note: Creative Consultant was a position similar to what today is called writing supervisor. The creative consultant gets to weigh in on upper level discussions about which sketches get selected.)
Al Franken
Writing staff
- John Bowman
- A. Whitney Brown
- Greg Daniels
- Tom Davis
- Jim Downey
- Al Franken
- Shannon Gaughan
- Jack Handey
- Phil Hartman
- Lorne Michaels
- Mike Myers (episodes 10–20)
- Conan O'Brien
- Bob Odenkirk
- Herb Sargent
- Tom Schiller (episodes 12–20)
- Robert Smigel
- Bonnie Turner
- Terry Turner
- Christine Zander

== Season 15 (1989–90) ==
Producer (Head Writer)
Jim Downey
Script Consultant
Herb Sargent
Creative Consultants
Al Franken and Jack Handey
Writing staff
- A. Whitney Brown
- Greg Daniels
- Tom Davis
- Jim Downey
- Al Franken
- Jack Handey
- Tom Hymes (episodes 13–20)
- Lorne Michaels
- Mike Myers
- Conan O'Brien
- Bob Odenkirk
- Herb Sargent
- Tom Schiller
- Rob Schneider (episodes 18–20)
- Robert Smigel
- David Spade (episodes 18–20)
- Bonnie Turner
- Terry Turner
- Christine Zander

== Season 16 (1990–91) ==
Producer (Head Writer)
Jim Downey
Co-Producers
Al Franken, Jack Handey, David Daniels, Robert Smigel
Script Consultant
Herb Sargent
Creative Consultant
Evie Murray
Writing staff
- A. Whitney Brown
- Tom Davis
- Jim Downey
- Al Franken
- Jack Handey
- Lorne Michaels
- Conan O'Brien
- Bob Odenkirk
- Andrew Robin (episodes 10–20)
- Adam Sandler (episodes 7–20)
- Herb Sargent
- Rob Schneider
- Robert Smigel
- David Spade
- Bonnie Turner
- Terry Turner
- Christine Zander

== Season 17 (1991–92) ==
Producer (Head Writer)
Jim Downey
Co-Producers
Al Franken, Jack Handey, Robert Smigel
Script Consultant
Herb Sargent
Creative Consultants
Tom Davis and Evie Murray
Writing staff
- Tom Davis
- Jim Downey
- Al Franken
- Jack Handey
- Warren Hutcherson
- Steve Koren (episodes 14–20)
- Daniel McGrath
- Lorne Michaels
- Adam Sandler
- Herb Sargent
- Rob Schneider
- Robert Smigel
- Bonnie Turner
- Terry Turner
- Christine Zander

== Season 18 (1992–93) ==
Producer (Head Writer)
Jim Downey
Script Consultant
Herb Sargent
Creative Consultant
Evie Murray
Writing staff
- Tom Davis
- Jim Downey
- Al Franken
- Jack Handey (episodes 11–20)
- Bruce Handy (episodes 10–20)
- Warren Hutcherson
- Dawna Kaufmann (episodes 15–20)
- Steven Koren
- David Mandel
- Ian Maxtone-Graham
- Tim Meadows
- Lorne Michaels
- Vanessa Middleton (episodes 10–20)
- Marilyn Suzanne Miller (episodes 15–20)
- Glenn Rockowitz
- Adam Sandler
- Herb Sargent
- Robert Smigel
- David Spade
- Bonnie Turner
- Terry Turner
- Christine Zander

== Season 19 (1993–94) ==
Producer (Head Writer)
Jim Downey
Script Consultant
Herb Sargent
Creative Consultant
Evie Murray (episodes 8–20)
Writing staff
- Dave Attell
- Tom Davis
- Tony DeSena
- Jim Downey
- Al Franken
- Tim Herlihy (episodes 15–20)
- Steven Koren
- Steve Lookner
- Norm Macdonald
- David Mandel
- Ian Maxtone-Graham
- Lorne Michaels
- Marilyn Suzanne Miller
- Jay Mohr
- Lewis Morton
- Herb Sargent
- Sarah Silverman
- Fred Wolf (episodes 4–20)

== Season 20 (1994–95) ==
Producer (Head Writer)
Jim Downey
Script Consultant
Herb Sargent
Creative Consultant
Evie Murray
Writing staff
- Jim Downey
- Al Franken
- Tim Herlihy
- Norm Hiscock
- Brian Kelley
- Laura Kightlinger
- Steven Koren
- Steve Lookner
- David Mandel
- Ian Maxtone-Graham
- Margo Meyer
- Lorne Michaels
- Marilyn Suzanne Miller
- Lewis Morton
- Adam Resnick (episodes 7–12, 20)
- Herb Sargent
- Drake Sather (episodes 3–20)
- Fred Wolf

== Season 21 (1995–96) ==
Writing Supervised (Head Written) By
Steve Higgins and Fred Wolf (Wolf: episodes 1-14, 17-20)
Creative Consultant
Steven Koren (episodes 12-20)
Writing staff
- Ross Abrash
- Cindy Caponera
- Jim Downey (Weekend Update Producer)
- Hugh Fink
- Tom Gianas
- Peter Gaulke (episodes 7–20)
- Jack Handey
- Tim Herlihy
- Steve Higgins
- Norm Hiscock
- Steven Koren
- Erin Maroney (episodes 3–20)
- Adam McKay
- Dennis McNicholas
- Lorne Michaels
- Lori Nasso
- Paula Pell
- Colin Quinn
- Frank Sebastiano
- Harper Steele
- Fred Wolf (episodes 1–14, 17–20)

== Season 22 (1996–97) ==
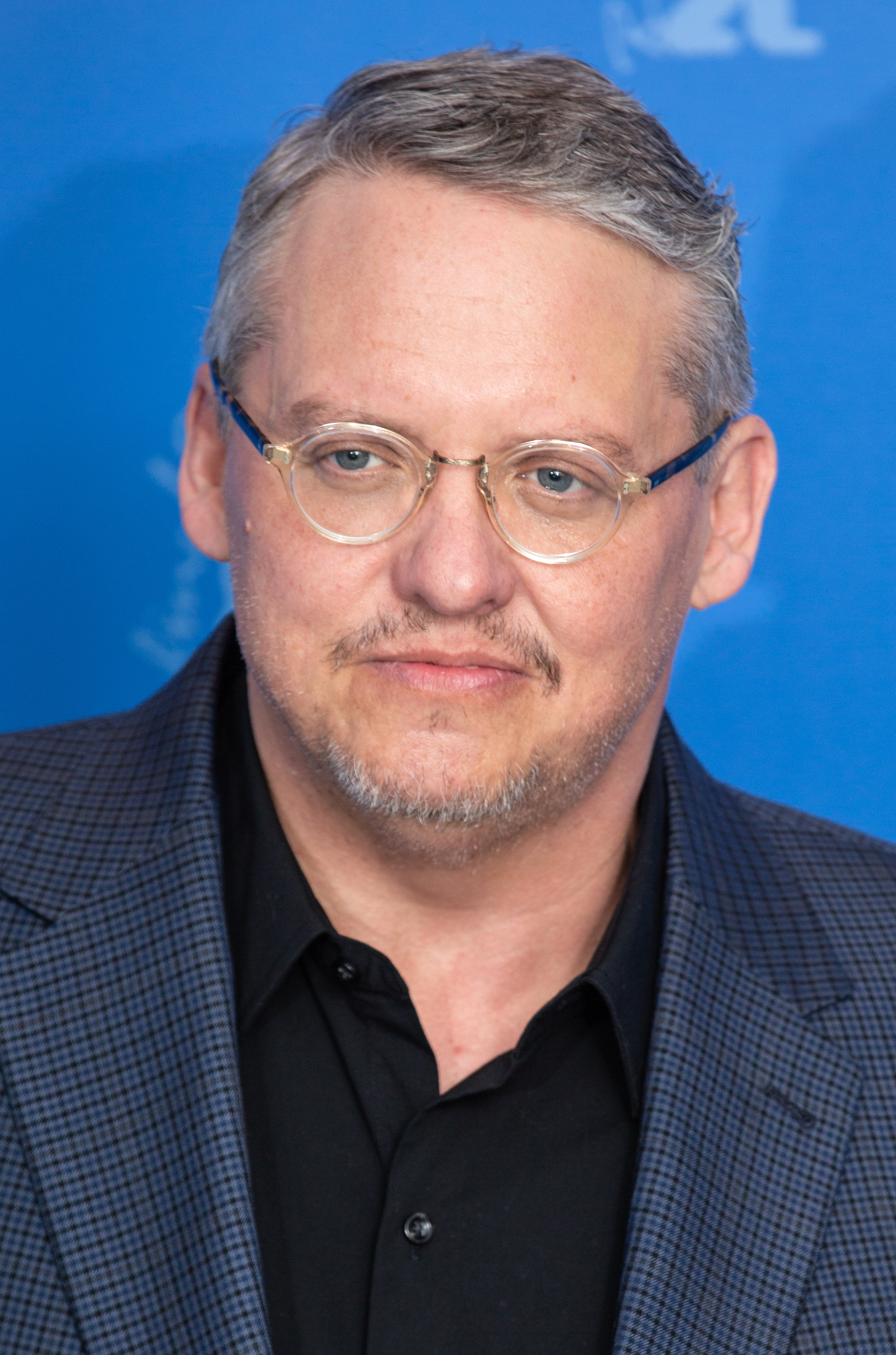
Adam McKay, the head writer from 1996–99.

Producer
Steve Higgins
Consulting Producers
Jim Downey (episodes 1–4) and Fred Wolf (episodes 1–4)
Writing Supervised (Head Written) By
Tim Herlihy and Adam McKay
Writing staff
- Ross Abrash
- David Breckman
- Cindy Caponera
- Robert Carlock
- Stephen Colbert (episodes 8–9)
- Jim Downey (Weekend Update Producer)
- Hugh Fink
- Tom Gianas
- Tim Herlihy
- Steve Higgins
- Norm Hiscock
- Adam McKay
- Dennis McNicholas
- Lorne Michaels
- Lori Nasso
- Paula Pell
- Matt Piedmont
- Colin Quinn
- Frank Sebastiano
- Robert Smigel
- Harper Steele
- Scott Wainio
- Fred Wolf (episodes 1–4)

== Season 23 (1997–98) ==
Producers
Steve Higgins and Tim Herlihy
Writing Supervised (Head Written) By
Adam McKay
Creative Consultant
Paula Pell
Writing staff
- Ross Abrash
- Cindy Caponera
- Robert Carlock
- Jim Downey (Weekend Update Producer: episodes 1–9; credited as a regular writer until the end of the season)
- Tina Fey
- Hugh Fink
- Tom Gianas
- Tim Herlihy
- Steve Higgins
- Michael McCullers
- Adam McKay
- Dennis McNicholas
- Lorne Michaels
- Lori Nasso
- Paula Pell
- Matt Piedmont
- Michael Schur (episodes 11–20)
- Frank Sebastiano
- Robert Smigel
- Harper Steele
- Scott Wainio

== Season 24 (1998–99) ==
Producers
Steve Higgins and Tim Herlihy
Writing Supervised (Head Written) By
Adam McKay
Creative Consultant
Paula Pell
Writing staff
- Robert Carlock
- Jerry Collins
- Steven Cragg
- Tony Daro (episodes 15–19)
- Tina Fey
- Hugh Fink
- Richard Francese (episodes 5–19)
- Matt Graham
- Tim Herlihy
- Steve Higgins
- Ray James
- Adam McKay
- Dennis McNicholas
- Lorne Michaels
- Lori Nasso
- Paula Pell
- Matt Piedmont
- Michael Schur
- T. Sean Shannon
- Robert Smigel
- Harper Steele
- Scott Wainio

== Season 25 (1999–2000) ==
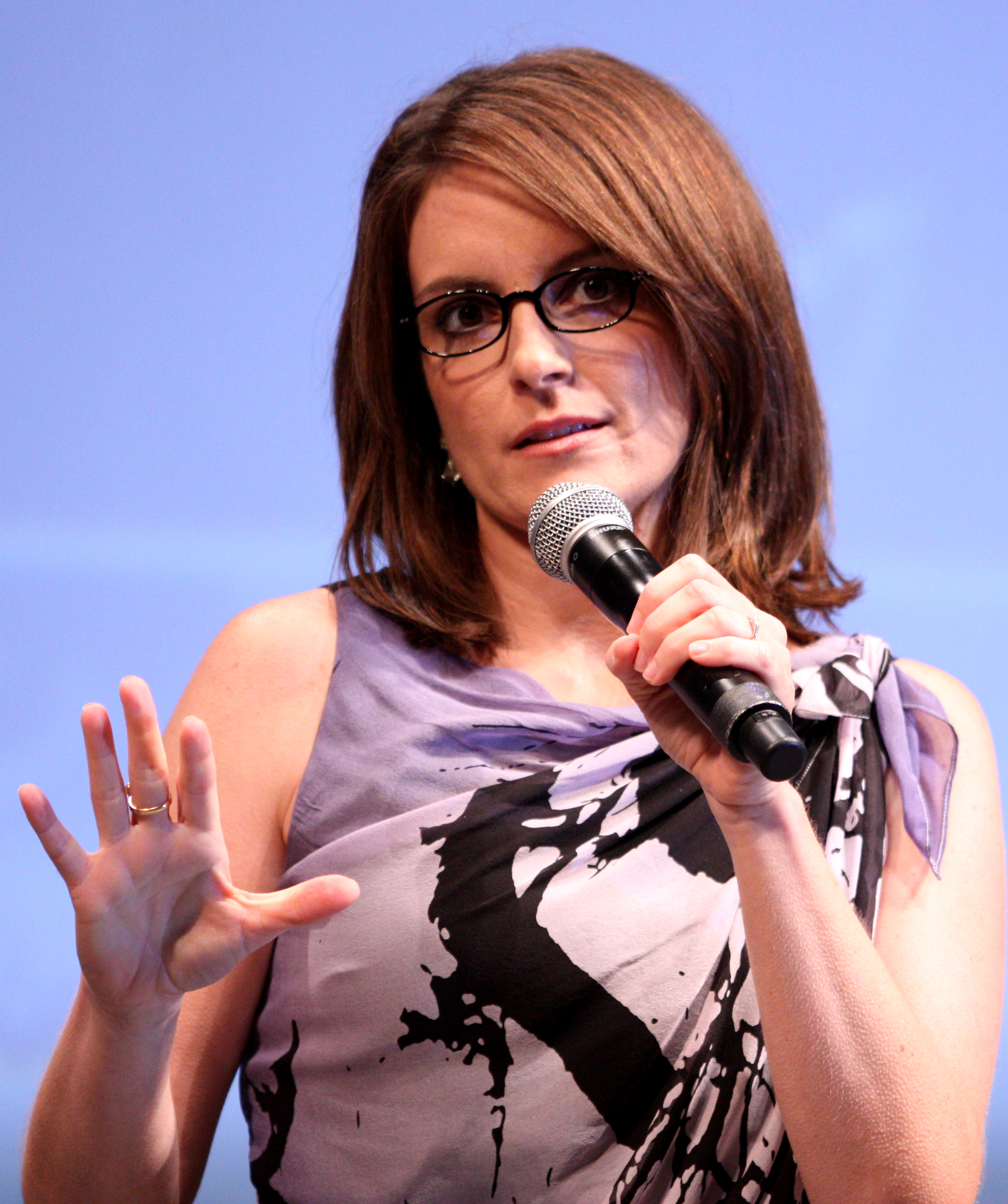
Tina Fey, the head writer from 1999–06.

Producers
Steve Higgins and Tim Herlihy (Herlihy: episodes 1–6)
Writing Supervised (Head Written) By
Tina Fey
Creative Consultants
Dennis McNicholas and Paula Pell
Writing staff
- Kevin Brennan
- Robert Carlock (Weekend Update Producer)
- Jerry Collins (episodes 1–8)
- Steven Cragg
- Tony Daro
- Ali Farahnakian (episodes 1–8)
- Tina Fey
- Hugh Fink
- Richard Francese
- Tim Herlihy (episodes 1–6)
- Steve Higgins
- Adam McKay
- Dennis McNicholas
- Lorne Michaels
- Paula Pell
- Matt Piedmont
- J. J. Philbin (episodes 2–8)
- Michael Schur
- T. Sean Shannon
- Robert Smigel
- Harper Steele
- Scott Wainio

== Season 26 (2000–01) ==
Producer
Steve Higgins
Head writers
Tina Fey and Dennis McNicholas (episodes 9–20)
Writing Supervisors
Paula Pell and Harper Steele (episodes 9–20)
Creative Consultants
Dennis McNicholas and Paula Pell (episodes (1–8)
Writing staff
- James Anderson
- Robert Carlock (Weekend Update Producer)
- Tony Daro
- Jim Downey
- Tina Fey
- Hugh Fink
- Melanie Graham
- Steve Higgins
- Erik Kenward (episodes 13–20)
- Adam McKay
- Dennis McNicholas
- Lorne Michaels
- Jerry Minor
- Matt Murray
- Paula Pell
- Matt Piedmont
- Jon Rosenfeld
- Michael Schur
- Frank Sebastiano (episodes 14–20)
- T. Sean Shannon
- Robert Smigel
- Barry Sobel
- Harper Steele
- Scott Wainio

Note: Beginning with the ninth episode of this season, the head writer receives a "head writer" credit for the first time since the 1985–86 season instead of "writing supervisor," and the "creative consultant" credit is renamed "writing supervisor."

== Season 27 (2001–02) ==
Producer
Steve Higgins
Head writer(s)
Tina Fey and Dennis McNicholas
Writing Supervisors
Paula Pell and Harper Steele
Writing staff
- Doug Abeles
- James Anderson
- Max Brooks
- Jim Downey
- Tina Fey
- Hugh Fink
- Charlie Grandy
- Jack Handey
- Steve Higgins
- Erik Kenward
- Dennis McNicholas
- Lorne Michaels
- Matt Murray
- Paula Pell
- Matt Piedmont
- Ken Scarborough (episodes 4–20)
- Michael Schur (Weekend Update Producer)
- Frank Sebastiano
- T. Sean Shannon
- Robert Smigel
- Emily Spivey
- Harper Steele
- Scott Wainio

== Season 28 (2002–03) ==
Producer
Steve Higgins
Head writer(s)
Tina Fey and Dennis McNicholas
Writing Supervisors
Paula Pell, T. Sean Shannon (episodes 3-–20), Harper Steele
Writing staff
- Doug Abeles
- Leo Allen
- James Anderson
- Max Brooks
- Jim Downey
- James Eagan (episodes 3–20)
- Tina Fey
- Charlie Grandy
- Steve Higgins
- Erik Kenward
- Dennis McNicholas
- Lorne Michaels
- Corwin Moore (episodes 3–20)
- Matt Murray
- Paula Pell
- Ken Scarborough
- Michael Schur (Weekend Update Producer)
- Frank Sebastiano
- T. Sean Shannon
- Eric Slovin
- Robert Smigel
- Emily Spivey
- Harper Steele
- Scott Wainio

== Season 29 (2003–04) ==
Producer
Steve Higgins
Head writer(s)
Tina Fey and Dennis McNicholas
Writing Supervisors
Paula Pell, T. Sean Shannon, Harper Steele
Writing staff
- Doug Abeles
- Leo Allen
- James Anderson
- Jordan Black
- Liz Cackowski (episodes 13–20)
- Jim Downey
- James Eagan (episodes 1–10)
- Tina Fey
- Charlie Grandy
- Steve Higgins
- David Iserson
- Joe Kelly (episodes 18–20)
- Erik Kenward
- John Lutz (episodes 13–20)
- Dennis McNicholas
- Lorne Michaels
- Matt Murray
- Paula Pell
- Ken Scarborough (episodes 1–10)
- Michael Schur (Weekend Update Producer)
- Frank Sebastiano
- T. Sean Shannon
- Eric Slovin
- Robert Smigel
- J. B. Smoove
- Emily Spivey
- Harper Steele
- Jason Sudeikis
- Rich Talarico (episodes 16–20)

== Season 30 (2004–05) ==
Producer
Steve Higgins
Head writer(s)
Tina Fey and Harper Steele
Writing Supervisors
Paula Pell and T. Sean Shannon
Writing staff
- Doug Abeles (Weekend Update Head Writer)
- Leo Allen
- James Anderson
- Alex Baze
- Liz Cackowski
- Jim Downey
- Tina Fey
- Charlie Grandy (Weekend Update Producer)
- Steve Higgins
- Joe Kelly
- Erik Kenward
- John Lutz
- Lorne Michaels
- Matt Murray
- Paula Pell
- Lauren Pomerantz
- Frank Sebastiano
- T. Sean Shannon
- Eric Slovin
- Robert Smigel
- J. B. Smoove
- Emily Spivey
- Harper Steele
- Jason Sudeikis
- Rich Talarico

== Season 31 (2005–06) ==
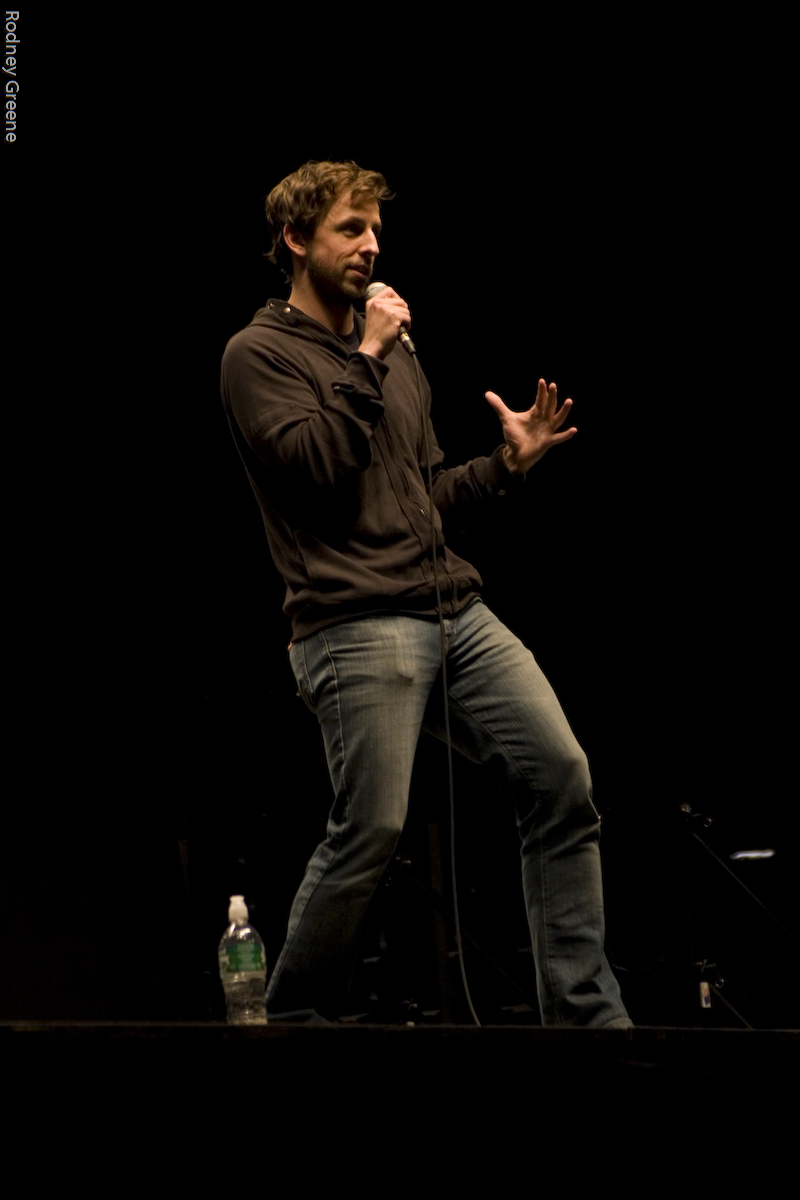
Seth Meyers, the head writer from 2006–2014

Producer
Steve Higgins
Head writer(s)
Tina Fey, Seth Meyers (episodes 10–19), and Harper Steele
Writing Supervisors
Seth Meyers (episodes 1–9)
Writing staff
- Doug Abeles (Weekend Update Head Writer)
- James Anderson
- Alex Baze
- Liz Cackowski
- Tina Fey
- Charlie Grandy (Weekend Update Producer)
- Steve Higgins
- Colin Jost
- Erik Kenward
- John Lutz
- Seth Meyers
- Lorne Michaels
- Matt Murray
- Paula Pell (episodes 10–19)
- Akiva Schaffer
- Frank Sebastiano
- T. Sean Shannon
- Robert Smigel
- J. B. Smoove
- Emily Spivey
- Harper Steele
- Jorma Taccone
- Bryan Tucker

== Season 32 (2006–07) ==
Producer
Steve Higgins
Head writer(s)
Seth Meyers, Paula Pell, and Harper Steele
Writing staff
- Doug Abeles (Weekend Update Head Writer)
- James Anderson
- Alex Baze
- Jim Downey
- Charlie Grandy (Weekend Update Producer)
- Steve Higgins
- Colin Jost
- Erik Kenward
- John Lutz
- Seth Meyers
- Lorne Michaels
- Matt Murray
- Paula Pell
- Andy Samberg (episode 10)
- Marika Sawyer
- Akiva Schaffer
- Robert Smigel
- John Solomon
- Emily Spivey
- Harper Steele
- Jorma Taccone
- Bryan Tucker

== Season 33 (2007–08) ==
Producer
Steve Higgins
Head writer(s)
Seth Meyers, Paula Pell, Harper Steele
Writing staff
- Doug Abeles (Weekend Update Head Writer)
- James Anderson
- Alex Baze
- Jim Downey
- Charlie Grandy (Weekend Update Producer)
- Steve Higgins
- Colin Jost
- Erik Kenward
- Rob Klein
- John Lutz
- Seth Meyers
- Lorne Michaels
- Paula Pell
- Simon Rich
- Marika Sawyer
- Akiva Schaffer
- Robert Smigel
- John Solomon
- Emily Spivey
- Harper Steele
- Kent Sublette
- Jorma Taccone (episodes 1–4)
- Bryan Tucker

== Season 34 (2008–09) ==
Producer
Steve Higgins
Head writer(s)
Seth Meyers
Writing Supervisor
Paula Pell
Writing staff
- Doug Abeles (Weekend Update Producer)
- James Anderson
- Alex Baze (Weekend Update Head Writer)
- Jessica Conrad
- Jim Downey
- Steve Higgins
- Colin Jost
- Erik Kenward
- Rob Klein
- John Lutz
- Seth Meyers
- Lorne Michaels
- John Mulaney
- Paula Pell
- Simon Rich
- Marika Sawyer
- Akiva Schaffer
- John Solomon
- Emily Spivey
- Kent Sublette
- Jorma Taccone
- Bryan Tucker

== Season 35 (2009–10) ==
Producer
Steve Higgins
Head writer(s)
Seth Meyers
Writing Supervisors
Colin Jost, John Mulaney, Emily Spivey (episodes 1–18), Bryan Tucker (episodes 19–22)
Writing staff
- Doug Abeles (Weekend Update Producer)
- James Anderson
- Alex Baze (Weekend Update Head Writer)
- Jillian Bell
- Hannibal Buress
- Jessica Conrad
- Jim Downey
- Steve Higgins
- Colin Jost
- Erik Kenward
- Jessi Klein (episodes 8–22)
- Rob Klein
- John Lutz
- Seth Meyers
- Lorne Michaels
- John Mulaney
- Christine Nangle
- Michael Patrick O'Brien
- Paula Pell (episodes 18–22)
- Ryan Perez
- Simon Rich
- Marika Sawyer
- Akiva Schaffer
- John Solomon
- Emily Spivey (episodes 1–18)
- Kent Sublette
- Jorma Taccone
- Bryan Tucker

== Season 36 (2010–11) ==
Producer
Steve Higgins
Co-Producer
Erik Kenward
Head writer(s)
Seth Meyers
Writing Supervisors
Colin Jost, John Mulaney, Bryan Tucker
Writing staff
- Doug Abeles (Weekend Update Producer)
- James Anderson
- Alex Baze (Weekend Update Head Writer & Producer)
- Heather Anne Campbell
- Jessica Conrad
- Matt Craig
- Jim Downey
- Tom Flanigan
- Shelly Gossman
- Steve Higgins
- Colin Jost
- Erik Kenward
- Rob Klein
- Jonathan Krisel
- Seth Meyers
- Lorne Michaels
- John Mulaney
- Christine Nangle
- Michael Patrick O'Brien
- Paula Pell
- Simon Rich
- Marika Sawyer
- Akiva Schaffer
- Sarah Schneider (episodes 18–22)
- John Solomon
- Kent Sublette
- Bryan Tucker

== Season 37 (2011–12) ==
Producers
Steve Higgins, John Mulaney, Erik Kenward
Head writer(s)
Seth Meyers
Writing Supervisors
Colin Jost, Bryan Tucker
Writing staff
- James Anderson
- Alex Baze (Weekend Update Producer)
- Jessica Conrad
- Jim Downey
- Shelly Gossman (episodes 1–12)
- Steve Higgins
- Colin Jost
- Zach Kanin
- Chris Kelly
- Erik Kenward
- Rob Klein
- Seth Meyers
- Lorne Michaels
- John Mulaney
- Christine Nangle
- Michael Patrick O'Brien
- Paula Pell (episodes 1, 6, 9–10, 13–14, 21–22)
- Marika Sawyer
- Sarah Schneider
- Pete Schultz
- John Solomon
- Kent Sublette
- Bryan Tucker

== Season 38 (2012–13) ==
Producers
Steve Higgins, Erik Kenward
Head writer(s)
Seth Meyers and Colin Jost
Writing Supervisors
Marika Sawyer, Bryan Tucker
Writing staff
- James Anderson
- Alex Baze (Weekend Update Head Writer)
- Neil Casey
- Michael Che (episodes 19–21)
- Jim Downey
- Steve Higgins
- Colin Jost
- Zach Kanin
- Chris Kelly
- Joe Kelly
- Erik Kenward
- Rob Klein
- Seth Meyers
- Lorne Michaels
- John Mulaney (episodes 3–5, 12, 16, 19, 21)
- Michael Patrick O'Brien
- Josh Patten (Weekend Update)
- Paula Pell (episodes 3, 6–8, 16–18)
- Marika Sawyer
- Sarah Schneider
- Pete Schultz (Weekend Update)
- John Solomon
- Kent Sublette
- Bryan Tucker

== Season 39 (2013–14) ==
Producers
Steve Higgins, Erik Kenward
Head writer(s)
Seth Meyers (episodes 1–13), Colin Jost, Rob Klein, Bryan Tucker (episodes 14–21)
Writing Supervisors
Marika Sawyer, John Solomon (episodes 2–21), Bryan Tucker (episodes 1–13)
Writing staff
- James Anderson
- Alex Baze (Weekend Update)
- Michael Che
- Mikey Day
- Steve Higgins
- Leslie Jones (episodes 11–21)
- Colin Jost (Head Writer)
- Zach Kanin
- Chris Kelly
- Erik Kenward
- Rob Klein (Head Writer)
- Seth Meyers (Head Writer, episodes 1–13)
- Lorne Michaels
- Claire Mulaney
- Josh Patten (Weekend Update)
- Paula Pell (episodes 1, 3, 6, 8–10, 13)
- Katie Rich (Weekend Update)
- Tim Robinson
- Marika Sawyer (Writing Supervisor)
- Sarah Schneider
- Pete Schultz (Weekend Update Producer, episodes 14–21)
- John Solomon (Writing Supervisor)
- Kent Sublette
- LaKendra Tookes (episodes 11–21)
- Bryan Tucker (Writing Supervisor, episodes 1–13; Head Writer, episodes 14–21)

== Season 40 (2014–15) ==
Producers
Steve Higgins, Erik Kenward
Head writer(s)
Colin Jost, Rob Klein, and Bryan Tucker
Writing Supervisors
Chris Kelly, Sarah Schneider, Kent Sublette
Writing staff
- James Anderson
- Jeremy Beiler
- Megan Callahan-Shah (episodes 16-–21)
- Michael Che
- Mikey Day
- Steve Higgins
- Leslie Jones (episodes 1–3)
- Colin Jost (Head Writer)
- Zach Kanin
- Chris Kelly (Writing Supervisor)
- Erik Kenward
- Rob Klein (Head Writer)
- Dave McCary
- Dennis McNicholas (Weekend Update Producer, episodes 7–21)
- Lorne Michaels
- Claire Mulaney
- Mike O'Brien
- Josh Patten
- Alison Rich
- Katie Rich (Weekend Update)
- Tim Robinson
- Natasha Rothwell
- Nick Rutherford
- Meredith Scardino (episodes 7–14)
- Sarah Schneider (Writing Supervisor)
- Pete Schultz (Weekend Update Head Writer)
- Streeter Seidell
- Kent Sublette (Writing Supervisor)
- Bryan Tucker (Head Writer)

== Season 41 (2015–16) ==
Producers
Steve Higgins, Erik Kenward
Head writer(s)
Rob Klein and Bryan Tucker
Writing Supervisors
Chris Kelly, Sarah Schneider, Kent Sublette
Writing staff
- James Anderson
- Jeremy Beiler
- Chris Belair
- Megan Callahan-Shah
- Michael Che
- Mikey Day
- Fran Gillespie
- Sudi Green
- Steve Higgins
- Colin Jost
- Zach Kanin
- Chris Kelly (Writing Supervisor)
- Erik Kenward
- Rob Klein (Head Writer)
- Paul Masella
- Dave McCary
- Dennis McNicholas (Weekend Update Producer)
- Lorne Michaels
- Josh Patten
- Katie Rich
- Tim Robinson
- Sarah Schneider (Writing Supervisor)
- Pete Schultz (Weekend Update Head Writer)
- Streeter Seidell
- Dave Sirus
- Will Stephen
- Kent Sublette (Writing Supervisor)
- Julio Torres (episodes 19–21)
- Bryan Tucker (Head Writer)

== Season 42 (2016–17) ==
Producers
Steve Higgins, Erik Kenward
Head writer(s)
Chris Kelly, Sarah Schneider, Bryan Tucker, and Kent Sublette (episodes 12–21)
Writing Supervisor
Kent Sublette (episodes 1–11)
Writing staff
- James Anderson
- Kristen Bartlett
- Jeremy Beiler
- Zack Bornstein
- Joanna Bradley
- Megan Callahan
- Michael Che
- Anna Drezen
- Fran Gillespie
- Sudi Green
- Steve Higgins
- Colin Jost
- Chris Kelly (Head Writer)
- Erik Kenward
- Rob Klein
- Nick Kocher
- Michael Koman (episodes 15–21)
- Dave McCary
- Brian McElhaney
- Dennis McNicholas (Weekend Update Producer)
- Drew Michael
- Lorne Michaels
- Josh Patten
- Katie Rich (episodes 1–11)
- Sarah Schneider (Head Writer)
- Pete Schultz (Weekend Update Head Writer)
- Streeter Seidell
- Will Stephen
- Kent Sublette (Writing Supervisor, Head Writer)
- Julio Torres
- Bryan Tucker (Head Writer)

== Season 43 (2017–18) ==
Producers
Steve Higgins, Erik Kenward
Head writer(s)
Colin Jost (episodes 9–21), Michael Che (episodes 9–21), Bryan Tucker, and Kent Sublette
Writing Supervisors
Streeter Seidell, Fran Gillespie (episodes 9–21), and Sudi Green (episodes 9–21)
Writing staff
- James Anderson
- Kristen Bartlett
- Megan Callahan-Shah (Weekend Update)
- Steven Castillo
- Michael Che (Co-Head Writer)
- Mikey Day
- Andrew Dismukes
- Anna Drezen
- Claire Friedman
- Fran Gillespie (Writing Supervisor)
- Sudi Green (Writing Supervisor)
- Steve Higgins
- Sam Jay
- Colin Jost (Co-Head Writer)
- Erik Kenward
- Nick Kocher
- Michael Koman
- Erik Marino
- Dave McCary
- Brian McElhaney
- Dennis McNicholas (Weekend Update Producer)
- Lorne Michaels
- Nimesh Patel (Weekend Update)
- Josh Patten (Weekend Update)
- Gary Richardson
- Katie Rich (Weekend Update)
- Pete Schultz (Weekend Update Head Writer)
- Streeter Seidell (Writing Supervisor)
- Will Stephen
- Kent Sublette (Head Writer)
- Julio Torres
- Bryan Tucker (Head Writer)

Note: Beginning with the show's forty-third season, Weekend Update writers were credited separately from the rest of the writing staff.

== Season 44 (2018–19) ==
Producers
Steve Higgins, Erik Kenward
Head writer(s)
Colin Jost, Michael Che, and Kent Sublette
Writing Supervisors
Streeter Seidell, Sudi Green, Fran Gillespie, and Anna Drezen (episodes 16–21)
Writing staff
- James Anderson
- Megan Callahan (Weekend Update)
- Steven Castillo
- Michael Che (Head Writer)
- Andrew Dismukes
- Anna Drezen (Writing Supervisor)
- Alison Gates
- Fran Gillespie (Writing Supervisor)
- Sudi Green (Writing Supervisor)
- Steve Higgins
- Sam Jay
- Colin Jost (Head Writer)
- Erik Kenward
- Michael Koman
- Alan Linic
- Eli Mandel
- Dennis McNicholas (Weekend Update)
- Lorne Michaels
- Josh Patten (Weekend Update)
- Gary Richardson
- Katie Rich (Weekend Update)
- Pete Schultz (Weekend Update Head Writer)
- Streeter Seidell (Writing Supervisor)
- Will Stephen
- Kent Sublette (Head Writer)
- Bryan Tucker (Senior Writer)
- Julio Torres
- Bowen Yang

== Season 45 (2019–20) ==
Producers
Steve Higgins, Erik Kenward
Head writer(s)
Colin Jost, Michael Che, and Kent Sublette
Writing Supervisors
Streeter Seidell, Sudi Green, Fran Gillespie, and Anna Drezen
Writing staff
- James Anderson
- Dan Bulla
- Megan Callahan-Shah (Weekend Update)
- Emma Clark
- Steven Castillo
- Andrew Dismukes
- Anna Drezen (Writing Supervisor)
- Alison Gates
- Fran Gillespie (Writing Supervisor)
- Sudi Green (Writing Supervisor)
- Steve Higgins
- Sam Jay
- Erik Kenward
- Dan Licata
- Dennis McNicholas (Weekend Update)
- Lorne Michaels
- Josh Patten (Weekend Update)
- Jasmine Pierce
- Gary Richardson
- Pete Schultz (Weekend Update)
- Streeter Seidell (Writing Supervisor)
- Mark Steinbach (Weekend Update)
- Will Stephen
- Bryan Tucker (Senior Writer)

== Season 46 (2020–21) ==
Producers
Steve Higgins, Erik Kenward
Head writer(s)
Anna Drezen, Colin Jost, Michael Che, and Kent Sublette
Writing Supervisors
Sudi Green, Fran Gillespie, and Streeter Seidell
Writing staff
- Dan Bulla
- Megan Callahan-Shah (Weekend Update)
- Steven Castillo
- Emma Clark
- Alison Gates
- Fran Gillespie (Writing Supervisor)
- Sudi Green (Writing Supervisor)
- Steve Higgins
- Sam Jay
- Erik Kenward
- Dan Licata
- Dennis McNicholas (Weekend Update)
- Lorne Michaels
- Josh Patten (Weekend Update)
- Jasmine Pierce
- Gary Richardson
- Pete Schultz (Weekend Update Head Writer)
- Streeter Seidell (Writing Supervisor)
- Mark Steinbach (Weekend Update)
- Will Stephen
- Bryan Tucker (Senior Writer)
- Celeste Yim

== Season 47 (2021–22) ==
Producers
Steve Higgins, Erik Kenward
Head writer(s)
Colin Jost, Michael Che, Kent Sublette, Anna Drezen (episodes 1–9), Alison Gates and Streeter Seidell (episodes 10–21)
Writing Supervisors
Streeter Seidell and Alison Gates (episodes 1–9)
Writing staff
- Rosebud Baker (episodes 13–21)
- Dan Bulla
- Megan Callahan-Shah (Weekend Update)
- Steven Castillo (episodes 1–9)
- Mike DiCenzo
- Billy Domineau
- Alex English
- Martin Herlihy
- John Higgins
- Steve Higgins
- Vannessa Jackson
- Erik Kenward
- Tesha Kondrat
- Ben Marshall
- Dennis McNicholas (Weekend Update)
- Lorne Michaels
- Jake Nordwind
- Clare O'Kane (episodes 13–21)
- Josh Patten (Weekend Update)
- Jasmine Pierce (episodes 1–9)
- Josh Patten
- Pete Schultz (Weekend Update Head Writer)
- Ben Silva
- Mark Steinbach (Weekend Update)
- Will Stephen
- Nicole Sun (episodes 13–21)
- Bryan Tucker (Senior Writer)
- Celeste Yim

== Season 48 (2022–23) ==
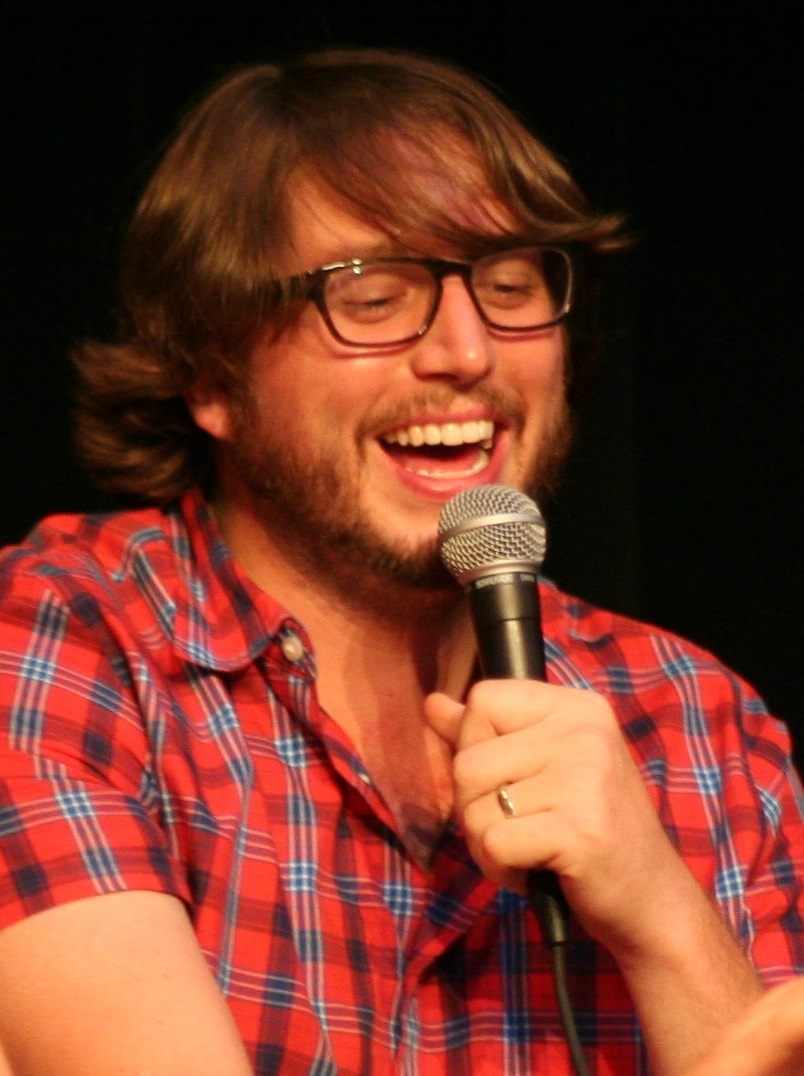
Streeter Seidell, a writer for the show since 2014, and a head writer, as of 2022

Producers
Steve Higgins, Erik Kenward
Head writer(s)
Kent Sublette, Alison Gates and Streeter Seidell
Writing Supervisors
Gary Richardson, Will Stephen, and Celeste Yim (episodes 12–18)
Writing staff
- Rosebud Baker
- Dan Bulla
- Megan Callahan-Shah (Weekend Update)
- Michael Che
- Mike DiCenzo
- Alex English
- Jimmy Fowlie
- Martin Herlihy
- John Higgins
- Steve Higgins
- Vannessa Jackson
- Colin Jost
- Erik Kenward
- Ben Marshall
- Dennis McNicholas (Weekend Update)
- Lorne Michaels
- Jake Nordwind
- Clare O'Kane (episodes 1–9)
- Ceara O'Sullivan
- Josh Patten
- Gary Richardson
- Pete Schultz (Weekend Update Head Writer)
- KC Shornima (Weekend Update)
- Ben Silva
- Will Stephen
- Bryan Tucker (Senior Writer)
- Asha Ward (episodes 7–18)
- Auguste White
- Celeste Yim

== Season 49 (2023–24) ==
Producers
Steve Higgins, Erik Kenward
Head writer(s)
Alison Gates, Streeter Seidell, Kent Sublette
Writing Supervisors
Gary Richardson, Will Stephen, Celeste Yim
Writing staff
- Rosebud Baker
- Dan Bulla
- Megan Callahan-Shah (Weekend Update)
- Steven Castillo (episodes 9–20)
- Michael Che
- Mike DiCenzo
- Alex English
- Jimmy Fowlie
- Martin Herlihy
- John Higgins
- Steve Higgins
- Vannessa Jackson
- Colin Jost
- Erik Kenward
- Ben Marshall
- Dennis McNicholas (Weekend Update)
- Lorne Michaels
- Jake Nordwind
- Ceara O'Sullivan
- Josh Patten (Weekend Update)
- Pete Schultz (Weekend Update Head Writer)
- KC Shornima (Weekend Update)
- Ben Silva (episodes 1–8)
- Bryan Tucker (Senior Writer)
- Asha Ward
- August White

== Season 50 (2024–25) ==
Producers
Steve Higgins, Erik Kenward
Head writer(s)
Alison Gates, Streeter Seidell, Kent Sublette
Writing Supervisors
Dan Bulla, Will Stephen, Auguste White, Celeste Yim
Writing staff
- Rosebud Baker (Weekend Update)
- Dan Bulla
- Megan Callahan-Shah (Weekend Update)
- Steven Castillo
- Michael Che
- Mike DiCenzo
- Jimmy Fowlie
- Sudi Green (episodes 1–7)
- Martin Herlihy
- John Higgins
- Steve Higgins
- Colin Jost
- Erik Kenward
- Allie Levitan
- Ben Marshall
- Dennis McNicholas (Weekend Update)
- Lorne Michaels
- Jake Nordwind
- Ceara O'Sullivan
- Josh Patten (Weekend Update)
- Moss Perricone
- Pete Schultz (Weekend Update Head Writer)
- KC Shornima (Weekend Update)
- Carl Tart
- Bryan Tucker (Senior Writer)
- Asha Ward
- Auguste White

== Season 51 (2025–26) ==
Producers
Steve Higgins, Erik Kenward, Erin Doyle
Head writer(s)
Alison Gates, Erik Kenward, Streeter Seidell, Kent Sublette
Writing Supervisors
Dan Bulla, Will Stephen
Writing staff
- Jack Bensinger
- Dan Bulla
- Megan Callahan-Shah (Weekend Update)
- Michael Che
- Mike DiCenzo
- Tucker Flodman
- Jimmy Fowlie
- Maxwell Gay
- Martin Herlihy
- Steve Higgins
- Colin Jost
- Erik Kenward
- Allie Levitan
- Claire McFadden
- Dennis McNicholas (Weekend Update)
- Lorne Michaels
- Jake Nordwind
- Ceara O'Sullivan
- Josh Patten (Weekend Update)
- Rachel Pegram
- Moss Perricone
- Pete Schultz (Weekend Update Head Writer)
- KC Shornima (Weekend Update)
- Jo Sunday
- Carl Tart
- Bryan Tucker (Senior Writer; Episodes 10-20)
- Asha Ward
- Maddie Wiener

== Season 52 (2026–27) ==
Producers
Steve Higgins, Erik Kenward, Erin Doyle
Head writer(s)
Alison Gates, Erik Kenward, Streeter Seidell, Kent Sublette
Writing Supervisors
Dan Bulla, Jake Nordwind, Will Stephen
Writing staff
- Bam Alston
- Jack Bensinger
- Dan Bulla
- Megan Callahan-Shah (Weekend Update)
- Michael Che
- Mike DiCenzo
- Tucker Flodman
- Jimmy Fowlie
- Maxwell Gay
- Steve Higgins
- Colin Jost
- Erik Kenward
- Allie Levitan
- Claire McFadden
- Dennis McNicholas (Weekend Update)
- Lorne Michaels
- Jake Nordwind
- Ceara O'Sullivan
- Josh Patten (Weekend Update)
- Moss Perricone
- Chase Rosenberg
- Pete Schultz (Weekend Update Head Writer)
- KC Shornima (Weekend Update)
- Jo Sunday
- Carl Tart
- Bryan Tucker (Senior Writer)
- Asha Ward
- Maddie Wiener

== Guest writers ==
Notable names, despite not being part of the writing team, that provided material for the show or wrote on trial runs for a brief period.

- Paul Thomas Anderson (Season 25)
- Neal Brennan (Season 45)
- Louis C.K. (Various seasons throughout the 1990s)
- Zach Galifianakis (Season 25)
- Mindy Kaling (Season 32)
- Kevin McDonald (Season 39)
- Edi Patterson (Season 38)
- Chelsea Peretti (Season 38)
- Jason Reitman (Season 33)

== Bibliography ==
- Shales, Tom; Miller, James Andrew (2002). Live From New York: An Uncensored History of Saturday Night Live. United States: Hachette Book Group USA. ISBN 0-316-73565-5.
