= Michael Che =

American comedian and actor (born 1983)

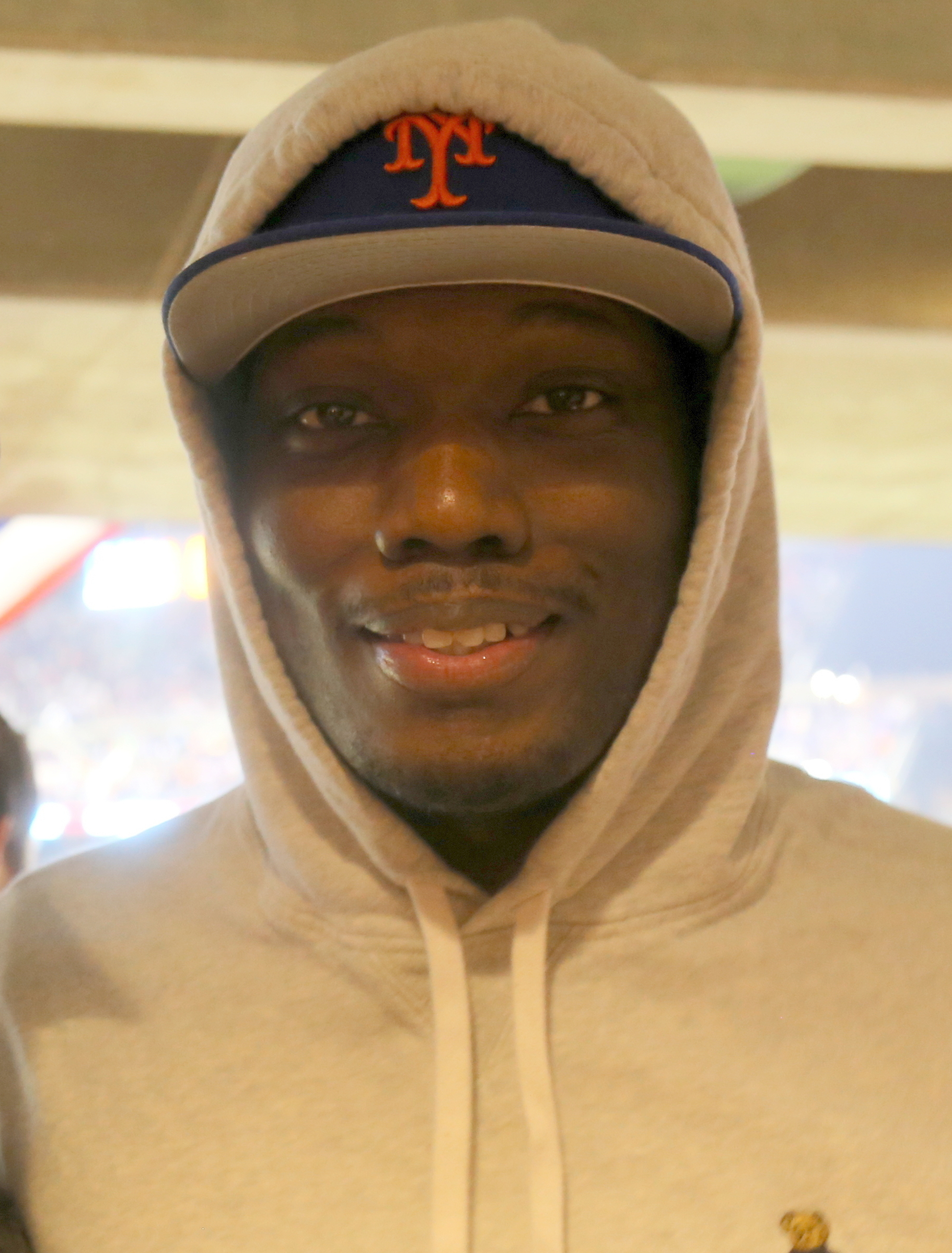
- Che in 2015
- Born: Michael Che Campbell; May 19, 1983 (age 43); New York City, U.S.

Comedy career
- Years active: 2009–present
- Medium: Stand-up; television; film
- Genres: Political/news satire; observational comedy; sketch comedy; blue comedy; insult comedy; racial humor
- Subjects: Mass media/news media/media criticism; American politics; African American culture; current events; pop culture
- Website: michaelche.com

Michael Che Campbell (/ˈtʃeɪ/; born May 19, 1983) is an American stand-up comedian, actor, and writer. Che is best known for his work on the NBC sketch comedy series Saturday Night Live, where he has served as co-anchor on Weekend Update alongside Colin Jost since 2014. Che and Jost were co-head writers at SNL from 2017 until 2022. The duo also co-hosted the 70th Primetime Emmy Awards in 2018.

Che was briefly a correspondent for The Daily Show with Jon Stewart and has previously worked as a writer for Saturday Night Live. At the end of September 2014, he became a Weekend Update co-anchor for the 40th season of Saturday Night Live alongside Colin Jost, replacing Cecily Strong.

== Early life and education ==
Michael Che Campbell was born on May 19, 1983, in New York City, the youngest of seven children of Rose and Nathaniel Campbell. His father gave him his middle name after the revolutionary Che Guevara. He has four older brothers and two older sisters. One of his older brothers is a detective with the New York Police Department, and another retired from law enforcement.

Che was raised in the Alfred E. Smith Houses in Two Bridges, a neighborhood on the Lower East Side of Manhattan. He graduated from the Fiorello H. LaGuardia High School of Music & Art and Performing Arts.

== Career ==
Che worked in customer service for a Toyota car dealership for two years. He also created acrylic portraits of celebrities, printed the portraits on T-shirts, and sold them in SoHo. Tommy Hilfiger noticed his work and offered Che freelance work, but he did not turn in any designs.

=== Beginnings and Saturday Night Live ===
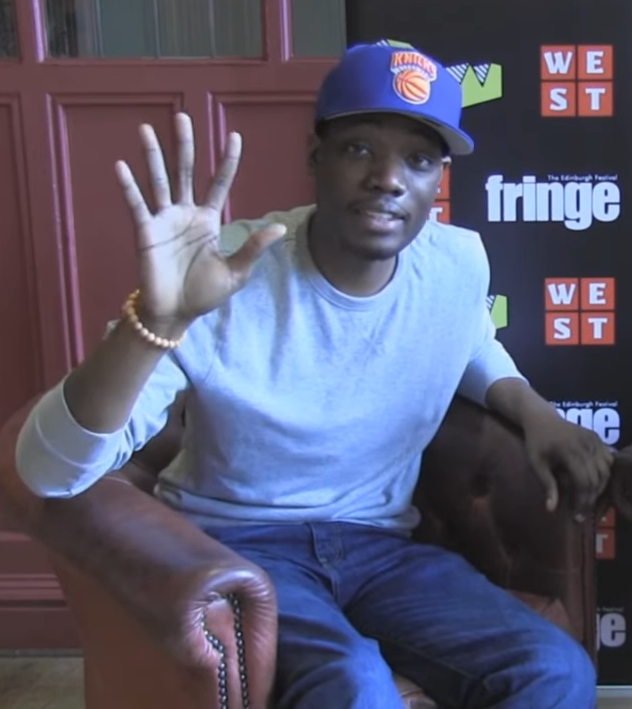
Che in 2013

Che started performing stand-up comedy in 2009, regularly working several sets per night. In 2012, Che appeared on the Late Show with David Letterman. In 2013, Variety called Che one of "10 Comics to Watch", while Rolling Stone named him one of "The 50 Funniest People".

Che joined Saturday Night Live as a writer in 2013, at first as a guest writer and soon after as staff writer. On April 28, 2014, it was announced that Che would join The Daily Show in June as a correspondent. Che made his onscreen debut as a Daily Show correspondent on June 4. Although he appeared in only nine segments during his brief tenure on the show, he was lauded by TV Guide for his work. His signature piece for the Daily Show was "Race/Off: Live From Somewhere", a satirical commentary on the 2014 Ferguson protests. In this segment, Che "reported" from various locations (with frequent background changes accomplished via chroma key), looking for a place where a black man would not be harassed by police officers. The sketch ended with Che floating in outer space.

On September 11, 2014, it was announced that Che would take over Cecily Strong's position as a Weekend Update co-anchor for the 40th season of SNL, co-anchoring the segment with Colin Jost. Che is the first African-American co-anchor in the history of Weekend Update. During his first two seasons, Che primarily hosted Weekend Update and rarely appeared in any sketches. During his third season, Che was promoted to the main cast. In December 2017, Che was named co-head writer of Saturday Night Live. Vulture's Megh Wright complimented the Weekend Update joke-swapping segment where Che and Jost write embarrassing jokes for each other to deliver, with Che's jokes often being used to portray Jost as racist. Che, along with Jost, resigned as head writer ahead of the show's 48th season in 2022.

At a stand-up show on March 26, 2022, Che announced that he was leaving the desk after the current season, although he did not state when or why he was leaving. After initially denying in an Instagram post he would leave, he later told Tony Dokoupil on the May 15, 2022 edition of CBS News Sunday Morning that he was uncertain about his future on SNL. He has continued to stay on the show since then.

=== Other appearances ===
In 2014, Che appeared in the movie Top Five, appearing as one of Chris Rock's character's friends.

On September 17, 2018, Che co-hosted the Emmy Awards with Colin Jost. Che and Jost also appeared on the March 4, 2019, episode of WWE's Monday Night Raw, where both were announced as special correspondents for WrestleMania 35. The pair got involved in a storyline with wrestler Braun Strowman, which eventually resulted in Che and Jost becoming participants in the André the Giant Memorial Battle Royal at WrestleMania.

== Filmography ==
=== Film ===
Year	Film	Role
2013	Chinese Puzzle	Un passant
2014	Lyle	Threes
2014	Top Five	Paul

=== Television ===
Year	Series	Role	Notes
2012	John Oliver's New York Stand-Up Show	Himself	Episode: "3.5"
2013	Gotham Comedy Live	Himself	S1 E10
2013–present	Saturday Night Live	Himself, Various	Also writer
2014	The Half Hour	Himself	Stand-up special
2014	The Daily Show	Himself	9 episodes
2016	Michael Che Matters	Himself, Executive Producer, Writer	Netflix special
2017	Saturday Night Live Weekend Update Thursday	Himself, Writer	3 episodes; also writer
2017	Detroiters	Actor, Writer	1 episode
2018	70th Primetime Emmy Awards	Himself (host), Writer	TV special
2018	Seth Rogen's Hilarity for Charity	Himself	TV special
2018	Bumping Mics with Jeff Ross & Dave Attell	Himself	1 episode
2019	The Other Two	Himself	1 episode
2019	Sesame Street	Himself	Guest
2019	WWE Raw	Himself	Special guest (2 episodes)
2019	WrestleMania 35	Himself	Special guest
2021–2022	That Damn Michael Che	Himself, Executive Producer, Writer	Creator, Writer
2021	Michael Che: Shame the Devil	Himself, Writer	Netflix Special
2021	Quest for Craft	Actor	1 episode
2022	Ziwe	Himself	Episode: "Men!"
2022	Sean Patton: Number One	Executive Producer	
2026	Michael Che: Shot in Minnesota	Himself, Writer	Netflix Special

== Awards and honors ==
Year	Award	Nominated work	Result
2015	Writers Guild of America Award for Comedy/Variety (Including Talk) – Series	Saturday Night Live	Nominated
2016	Writers Guild of America Award for Comedy/Variety – Sketch Series	Saturday Night Live	Nominated
2016	Primetime Emmy Award for Outstanding Writing for a Variety Series	Saturday Night Live	Nominated
2017	Writers Guild of America Award for Comedy/Variety – Sketch Series	Saturday Night Live	Won
2017	Primetime Emmy Award for Outstanding Writing for a Variety Series	Saturday Night Live	Nominated
2018	Writers Guild of America Award for Comedy/Variety – Sketch Series	Saturday Night Live	Won
2018	Writers Guild of America Award for Comedy/Variety – Sketch Series	Saturday Night Live Weekend Update Thursday	Nominated
2018	Primetime Emmy Award for Outstanding Writing for a Variety Series	Saturday Night Live	Nominated
2019	Writers Guild of America Award for Comedy/Variety – Sketch Series	Saturday Night Live	Nominated
2019	Primetime Emmy Award for Outstanding Writing for a Variety Series	Saturday Night Live	Nominated
2020	Writers Guild of America Award for Comedy/Variety – Sketch Series	Saturday Night Live	Nominated
2022	Writers Guild of America Award for Comedy/Variety – Sketch Series	Saturday Night Live	Nominated
2022	Writers Guild of America Award for Comedy/Variety – Sketch Series	That Damn Michael Che	Nominated

Media offices
Preceded by Colin Jost and Cecily Strong	Weekend Update anchor with Colin Jost; September 27, 2014 – present	Succeeded by Incumbent
Preceded by Chris Kelly, Sarah Schneider, Bryan Tucker, and Kent Sublette	SNL Head Writer (with Colin Jost, Bryan Tucker, and Kent Sublette); December 16, 2017 – May 19, 2018	Succeeded by Himself (with Colin Jost and Kent Sublette)
Preceded by Himself, Colin Jost, Bryan Tucker, and Kent Sublette	SNL Head Writer (with Colin Jost, and Kent Sublette); September 29, 2018 – May 9, 2020	Succeeded by Himself (with Colin Jost, Kent Sublette, and Anna Drezen)
Preceded by Himself, Colin Jost and Kent Sublette	SNL Head Writer (with Colin Jost, Kent Sublette, and Anna Drezen); October 3, 2020 – December 18, 2021	Succeeded by Himself (with Colin Jost, Kent Sublette, Alison Gates, and Streeter Seidell)
Preceded by Himself, Colin Jost, Kent Sublette, and Anna Drezen	SNL Head Writer (with Colin Jost, Kent Sublette, Alison Gates, and Streeter Seidell); January 15 – May 21, 2022	Succeeded by Kent Sublette, Alison Gates, and Streeter Seidell
