= Praise Petey =

American animated sitcom

- Genre: Animated sitcom; Adult animation; Black comedy; Drama
- Created by: Anna Drezen
- Starring: Annie Murphy; John Cho; Kiersey Clemons; Christine Baranski; Amy Hill; Stephen Root; Brian Jordan Alvarez
- Composer: Kathryn Bostic
- Country of origin: United States
- Original language: English
- No. of seasons: 1
- No. of episodes: 10

Production
- Executive producers: Anna Drezen; Monica Padrick; Mike Judge; Greg Daniels; Dustin Davis; Alex Bulkley; Corey Campodonico
- Producer: Tobias Conan Trost
- Running time: 22 minutes
- Production companies: Gorgeous Horse; The Monica Padrick Company; Bandera Entertainment; 20th Television Animation

Original release
- Network: Freeform
- Release: July 21 – August 18, 2023

Praise Petey is an American animated sitcom created by Anna Drezen for Freeform, which aired from July 21 to August 18, 2023. In November 2023, the series was canceled after one season.

== Premise ==
Petra "Petey" St. Barts is a wealthy New York socialite who had it all until her mother informs her that she inherited a small town from her recently deceased father called New Utopia. Upon arriving, she discovers that her father was a cult leader and that the residents have been brainwashed to mindlessly follow her due to her father's influence. Now with a new purpose in life, Petey hopes to have New Utopia think for themselves and be normal by starting with the abolishment of human sacrifices.

== Voice cast ==
=== Main ===
- Annie Murphy as Petra "Petey" St. Barts
- Christine Baranski as White St. Barts (formerly Tammy Overalls)
- Stephen Root as Petey's father
- John Cho as Bandit
- Amy Hill as Mae Mae
- Kiersey Clemons as Eliza
- Brian Jordan Alvarez as Emmett

=== Recurring ===
- Joel Kim Booster
- Anna Drezen as Ella
- Sheryl Lee Ralph
- Mitra Jouhari as Polli
- James Austin Johnson as the Pharmacist
- Kenan Thompson as Elder Amos
- Fred Tatasciore as Elder Duncan
- James Hong as Elder Belshazzar
- Paget Brewster as Wife Beth
- Debra Wilson as Wife Joslyn
- Alex Song-Xia as Wife Wendy
- Paris Sashay as Grease Trap Connie
- Eve Plumb as Big Judy

=== Guest ===
- Alan Tudyk as Himself
- Alfred Molina as Human Shih Tzu
- Patti Harrison as Amy
- Michael Cera as Harold "Little Einstein"

== Episodes ==
No.	Title	Directed by	Written by	Original release date	Prod. code
1	"Taxi to the South!"	Steven Chan	Anna Drezen	July 21, 2023	1TQM01
Petra "Petey" St. Barts, a somewhat successful New York fashion magazine assistant, takes a turn in her life when her previously unknown father dies. In a recorded will her father mentions she is now the leader of New Utopia, a small town in the West Carolinas. There, she meets Bandit, a cult skeptic redneck/love interest, Mae Mae, her father's right hand and Eliza, a bartender with similar interests and one of Petey's Father wives. After the Cult Elders sacrifice Alan Tudyk, Petey is hesitant to stay in the town but a talk with Mae Mae makes Petey realize that New York is a "bigger cult" and that New Utopia will give her the first chance to be a "true" leader. After her leadership ceremony, Petey's first decree is to end ceremonial sacrifices and declares to change New Utopia for the better.
2	"Unemployment Crisis"	Megan Prazenica	Andrew Farmer	July 21, 2023	1TQM02
Petey, still trying to adapt to her new life as New Utopia's leader, sees some of the dehumanizing chores the population had under her father's influence, including multiple wives and a human Shih Tzu. Petey declares that New Utopia's population are liberated from her father's previous tasks, starting tonight with a speech. Mae Mae, The Elders and New Utopia's population are concerned about those changes and while trying to please Petey's new tasks the town eventually descends into chaos. Eventually, Petey has to backtrack on her statement to liberate the town, Petey and Eliza still discuss on ways on how to change New Utopia.
3	"We Need $30"	Jeff Asato-Schuetze	Taryn Englehart	July 28, 2023	1TQM03
Petey learns that New Utopia's economy runs under its own currency, mostly funded by the savings of newly recruited cult members, and before her arrival the town's resources have been scarce. After Mae Mae's high blood pressure medicine runs out, Petey and Eliza need a way to get $30. At the county fair, Bandit reveals to Petey he is Mae Mae's son. The out of town's Pharmacist helps Petey with the medicine and intends to join the cult after seeing Petey's resemblance to a woman named "Tammy Overalls". During the induction ceremony Petey learns that the recruitment money was actually being used by The Elders to build marble houses, Petey declares to sell the houses and tells the Elders they will now live under one house. During the credits, the Elders have a new source of income, a reality show.
4	"Father's Knee"	Steven Chan	Rachel Hastings	July 28, 2023	1TQM04
Petey discovers that her father used to have his own local magazine. After seeing that the magazine was essentially a propaganda paper she decides to reboot the magazine. Bandit is strongly against the idea of the magazine reboot, saying it blackmailed people to avoid cult defections. Petey decides to make the magazine's main article about Bandit as she starts to learn more about Bandit's early life. Meanwhile, Ella (Anna Drezen), Petey's former friend comes to New Utopia and gets an intern position at the magazine, after getting ghosted by Petey, she decides to blackmail Petey with the help of Gene, the magazine's former reporter.
5	"Barn Wedding"	Megan Prazenica	Alex Song-Xia	August 4, 2023	1TQM05
After the town's economy is hit (again) Petey creates a website for wedding ceremonies inside the town's barn. Things change when its first wedding involves her former fiancé Brian (a literal wooden boyfriend). Petey tries to keep things straight with Brian's jealous bride Amy (Patti Harrison), Bandit being hired by Eliza to be her "date" and two different cultures clashing.
6	"Not-Sad Adult Birthday"	Jeff Asato-Schuetze	Andrea Marie Tyler	August 4, 2023	1TQM06
It's Petey's birthday, a new tape by her father reveals that her birthday is also known as Crowning Day to the inhabitants of New Utopia, celebrating her mother White more than Petey herself. White reveals to Petey that she was Tammy Overalls, making everyone who attends Crowning Day to sign an NDA to not reveal her previous association to New Utopia, everyone signs the NDA, except Eliza, who won't sign it unless there is a change with Crowning Day. Meanwhile, Bandit starts dating Polli (Mitra Jouhari), a girl who suspiciously looks similar to Petey.
7	"The Tangible Secret"	Steven Chan	Nicky Guerreiro & Lauren Halberg	August 11, 2023	1TQM08
Petey starts feeling doubts about her leadership, a tape from her father makes her embark on a spiritual quest by climbing Yonder Mountain. She runs into Bandit, his dog Hydrangea and his scout mentee Little Einstein (Michael Cera). Bandit reveals that Petey's Father was his mentor when he was a boy and both climbed Yonder Mountain, that experience made Bandit question his own outlook of the cult. While the group uncover more secrets of Yonder Mountain, Eliza starts developing a crush to Connie (Paris Sashay), the grease-cleaning plumber, with Mae Mae helping her to get another date.
8	"Drippy Drips"	Megan Prazenica	Monica Padrick & Gaelyn Golde	August 11, 2023	1TQM07
Bandit runs for mayor of New Utopia against the current mayor Pancakes (who is a dog). Petey inadvertently gives approval to release swamp gas which Elder Amos explains it will give psychoactive effects to the population of New Utopia for the next 12 hours. Bandit, with the help of Polli, ends up winning the election by one vote while Petey, under the influence of the gas, negotiates a new contract with Don, the owner of the ice cream franchise Drippy Drips. While she succeds on signing a new contract, Mae Mae reveals that the contract helped to fund the alien-related projects of Petey's Dad.
9	"Punishment Hole"	Jeff Asato-Schuetze	Taryn Englehart & Andrew Farmer	August 18, 2023	1TQM09
Petey's UTI causes gossip to run rampant in New Utopia, which increasingly focuses on her sex life. Mae Mae tells to Petey that her UTI is part of a bigger plan as shown in a prophetic tapestry that ends with her having a new "blood heir". Mae Mae tries to court Petey with handsome men and also sends the Elders to New York to retrieve Petey's frozen eggs. Eliza and Connie go to a cooking class, there, Eliza breaks down discussing the complicated relationship she has with Petey. As Petey wants to set boundaries about her, she becomes more narcissist and clashes with recently elected mayor Bandit, Mae Mae and everyone who has a contrary opinion about her.
10	"Comet Day"	Steven Chan	Anna Drezen & Alison Gates	August 18, 2023	1TQM10
Petey wants to go to an award ceremony in New York with Eliza, but Eliza mentions they cannot leave New Utopia as its residents are always on the look of a comet that will take them to a new planet. After she declares that Comet Day is happening tonight, Petey tells Bandit she plans to use the comet arrival as a way to deprogram the town's residents. After a talk with Bandit's therapist and Kimball, one of the hunks Mae Mae sent to court Petey, she decides to dismiss her initial plan she wrote with Bandit. That night, the comet doesn't arrive and Petey gives a speech, proclaiming she's actually the comet, cementing her role as leader of the cult. When Bandit and Eliza fight with Petey and call her a "liar" the comet arrives for real, being ridden by an anthropomorphic goat-looking alien. Elder Krad jumps onto the comet and it takes him away. In the final scene of the series, White listens to a podcast by Seredith Mump-Klein, a journalist who was secretly investigating the city, she is about to uncover the secrets of Petey and New Utopia, angering White.

== Production ==
In December 2021, Freeform announced a series order for the animated series Praise Petey. The series was created by Anna Drezen and is executive produced by Monica Padrick, with 20th Television Animation, a division of Disney Television Studios, co-producing the series, alongside Mike Judge and Greg Daniels of Bandera Entertainment, and Alex Bulkley, Corey Campodonico and Monica Padrick of ShadowMachine. Animation services were provided by Jam Filled Entertainment, a division of Boat Rocker Media. Production began in early 2022. On November 13, 2023, Freeform canceled the series after one season.

== Release ==
The series premiered on July 21, 2023, on Freeform. Two episodes were released in a back-to-back order each week, and were made available for streaming on Hulu the following day. The series was made available on Disney+ internationally via the Star hub as a Star Original and Star+ In Latin America. Consequently, Praise Petey was removed from all of Disney's streaming services from February 29 as a result of the company performing tax write offs on shows that are not successful. The series became available on Amazon Prime Video on September 9, 2025.

== Reception ==
Judy Berman of TIME named the series "Summer TV's most delightful surprise." She praised Drezen's "keen awareness of the absurdity of setting a female-empowerment narrative within a bloodthirsty cult" and called the series "a distinctly post-girlboss comedy, one that acknowledges Petey's determination to turn New Utopia around as the girl-power trope it is."

Jenna Scherer of A.V. Club gave the series a B− rating, noting that it felt too reminiscent, or at least serving as a parody of Schitt's Creek (which also had the involvement of Annie Murphy), and referred to it as "generic by design", but was still able to find the show "undeniably charming" with "mile-a-minute jokes" that she considered worked around "70 percent of the time".

Daniel Kurland of Bubbleblabber gave the series an 8.5 out of 10, specifically praising the rom-com part of the series between Petey and Bandit, saying "There's a playful will they/won't they rom-com energy between Petey and the town hottie, Bandit. It's pretty telegraphed, but still works and becomes more natural over time even if it's born out of a hackneyed place. Praise Petey's writing is still smart enough to get ahead of it all and actually make you want to root for these two crazy kids' love. If nothing else, it's just encouraging to see a show that has so many strong female characters where all of the best lines come from women."
