= Colin Jost =

American comedian, writer and actor (born 1982)

- Jost in 2026
- Born: Colin Kelly Jost; June 29, 1982 (age 44); New York City, U.S.
- Education: Harvard University (BA)
- Spouse: Scarlett Johansson (m. 2020)
- Children: 1

Comedy career
- Years active: 2005–present
- Medium: Stand-up; television; film
- Genres: Political/news satire; observational comedy; sketch comedy; blue comedy; insult comedy; surreal humor
- Subjects: Mass media/news media/media criticism; American politics; American culture; current events; pop culture
- Website: colinjost.com

Colin Kelly Jost (/ˈdʒoʊst/; born June 29, 1982) is an American comedian, writer, and actor. He has been a staff writer for the NBC sketch comedy series Saturday Night Live since 2005, and co-anchor of Weekend Update since 2014. He also served as one of the show's co-head writers from 2012 to 2015 and later came back as one of the show's head writers from 2017 to 2022 alongside Michael Che.

In 2025, Jost received an Honorary Doctor of Humane Letters degree from the College of Staten Island, CUNY, in recognition of his contributions to comedy, television, and community service. He is a two-time Primetime Emmy Award winner and nineteen-time Emmy Award nominee for his work on Saturday Night Live and as a host of the gameshow Pop Culture Jeopardy!.

== Early life and education ==
Jost was born on June 29, 1982, in New York City. He was raised in a Catholic household in the Grymes Hill neighborhood of Staten Island. His mother, Kerry J. Kelly, was the chief medical officer for the New York City Fire Department, and his father, Daniel A. Jost, was a teacher at Staten Island Technical High School. He has one younger brother, Casey Jost, a writer and a producer of Impractical Jokers; he also had a role in Staten Island Summer.

Jost attended Regis High School in Manhattan, where he was the editor of the school newspaper The Owl and graduated in 2000. He then studied history and literature at Harvard University where he lived in Leverett House. He focused on Russian literature and British literature, and wrote his senior thesis on Vladimir Nabokov. Jost was president of The Harvard Lampoon and won $5,250 on a college edition of Weakest Link, but said he did not think he deserved to win. He graduated from Harvard in 2004 with a Bachelor of Arts, cum laude.

== Career ==
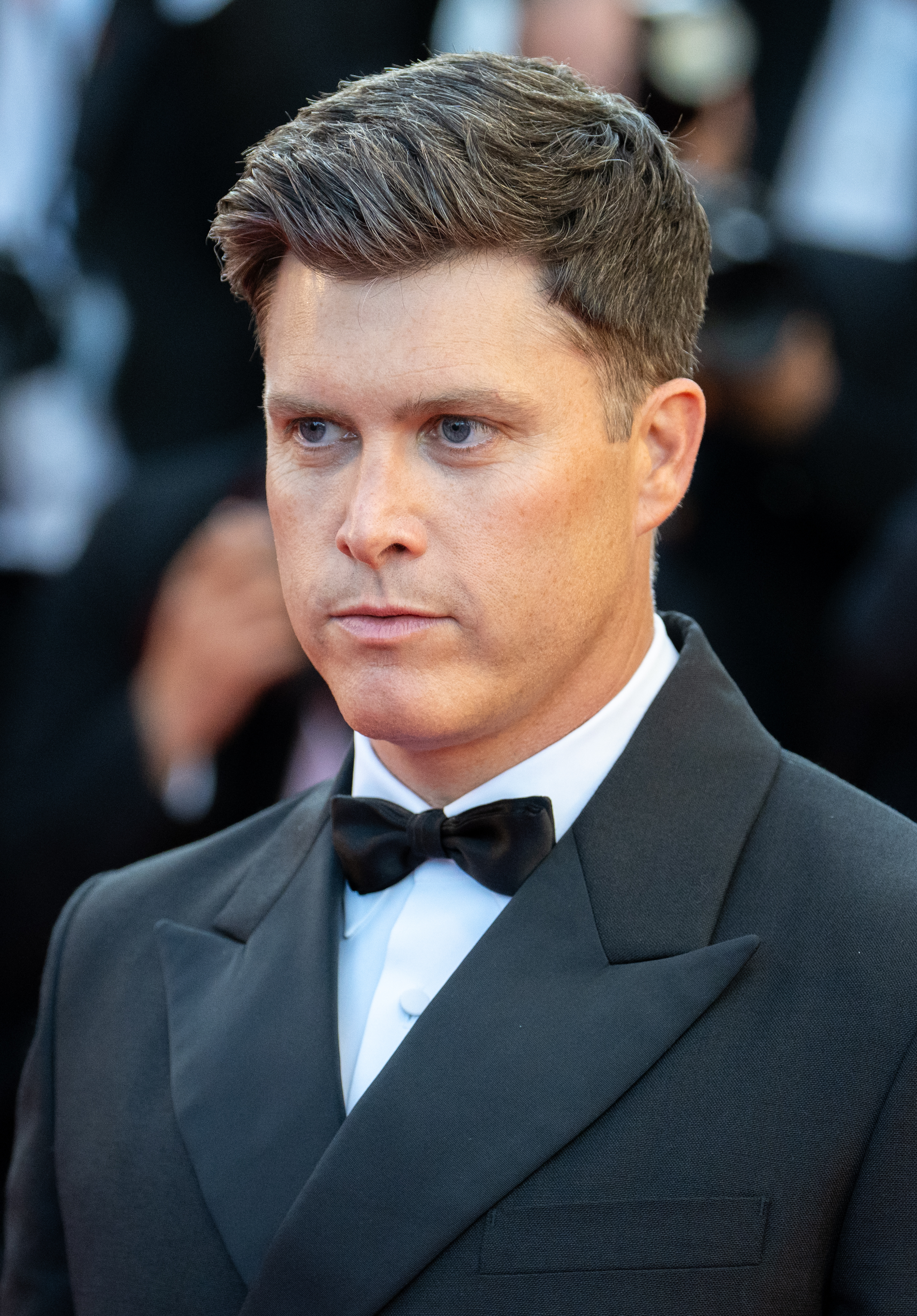
Jost in 2025

After graduation, Jost worked as a reporter and copy editor for the Staten Island Advance. He was then hired as a writer for a short-lived Nickelodeon animated show, Kappa Mikey. After that job, he sent in a writing packet to NBC's Saturday Night Live, which landed him a writing position in 2005.

From 2009 to 2012, Jost was SNL's writing supervisor. He was co-head writer from 2012 to 2015, and regained that status from 2017 to 2022. He often collaborated with fellow SNL co-head writer Rob Klein. During the summer hiatus following the 2012–2013 season, executive producer Lorne Michaels asked Jost if he could do the Weekend Update feature because co-anchor Seth Meyers would soon be leaving to host Late Night with Seth Meyers. Jost accepted and replaced Meyers on the March 1, 2014, episode. Jost broke Meyers' record for being the longest-serving anchor in the history of the segment with the October 23, 2021, episode hosted by Jason Sudeikis.

Jost has named Norm Macdonald as a primary influence for his Update anchor work, citing Macdonald's tone as the one he grew up with in high school. He has also named Tina Fey as an influence. In addition to Weekend Update, Jost made a brief cameo appearance as Ohio Governor John Kasich in a Republican presidential debate sketch. He later portrayed his friend Pete Buttigieg during the 2020 Democratic Party presidential primaries and Roger Goodell during the 2021 NFL season. In 2025 and 2026 he portrayed Secretary of Defense Pete Hegseth.

Jost has performed as a stand-up comedian, appearing on Late Night With Jimmy Fallon, TBS, and HBO. He was selected as a "New Face" at the Montréal Just for Laughs festival in 2009, and has since appeared at the Chicago Just for Laughs festival in 2011 and 2012 and the Montréal festival again in 2010 and 2012. Jost has published four "Shouts and Murmurs" pieces in The New Yorker magazine and has also contributed to The New York Times Magazine, The Huffington Post, The Staten Island Advance and Radar. He wrote the screenplay of and played a minor role in the 2015 comedy film Staten Island Summer, and he also had a minor role as Paul in the 2016 romantic comedy feature How to Be Single. In January 2016, Jost opened for comedian Liam McEneaney's album recording at The Bell House in Brooklyn. In late 2018, Jost and Green Bay Packers quarterback Aaron Rodgers appeared in an advertising campaign for Izod.

In September 2018, Jost cohosted the Primetime Emmy Awards, along with Michael Che.

Jost, along with Michael Che, appeared on the March 4, 2019, episode of WWE's Monday Night Raw, where both were announced as special correspondents for WrestleMania 35. In the March 4 episode, they got involved in a storyline with wrestler Braun Strowman, which resulted in both Jost and Che becoming participants in the André the Giant Memorial Battle Royal at WrestleMania.

In July 2020, Jost released a memoir, A Very Punchable Face: A Memoir. The book was well received and appeared on the New York Times Bestseller List.

External videos
- 2024 White House Correspondents' Association Dinner, April 27, 2024, C-SPAN

On April 27, 2024, Jost hosted the White House Correspondents' Dinner, an annual gathering of reporters usually entertained by the president and a comedian. In his 20-minute monologue, Jost roasted Trump and Biden, offered support of Biden's "decency", joked about his married life with Scarlett Johansson, and celebrated the free press.

Jost made a cameo in the 2024 film Fly Me to the Moon, which starred his wife Scarlett Johansson.

On July 31, 2024, it was announced that Jost would be the host of the game show Pop Culture Jeopardy! on Amazon Prime Video, later moving to Netflix in 2026.

== Personal life ==
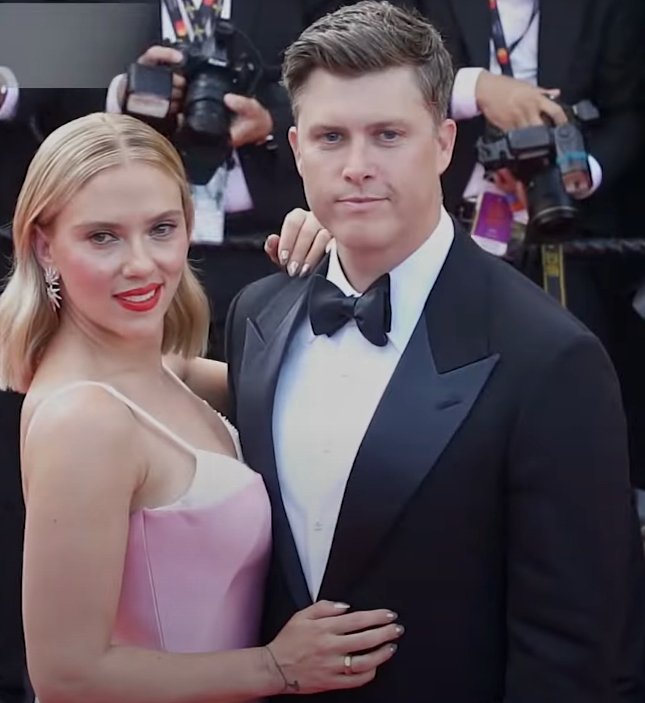
Jost and Scarlett Johansson in 2023

Jost was dormmates with former Secretary of Transportation Pete Buttigieg while the two lived in Leverett House at Harvard. In 2015, Jost donated money to Buttigieg's mayoral reelection campaign. Subsequently, during Buttigieg's presidential campaign, Jost portrayed Buttigieg in the 45th season of SNL.

Jost is married to actress Scarlett Johansson (marking Jost's first and Johansson's third marriage), whom he met during one of her many occasions hosting SNL. They began a relationship in May 2017; in May 2019, the two became engaged. They married in October 2020 at their New York home. Johansson gave birth to their son in August 2021.

In 2023, Jost, along with fellow SNL comedian and Staten Island native Pete Davidson, purchased a decommissioned Staten Island Ferry boat, the MV John F. Kennedy. The ferry was used in the film Screamboat.

Jost is an avid surfer, and was sent to Tahiti by NBC Sports for its coverage of the surfing competition at the 2024 Summer Olympics. However, he went back home for medical treatment before the competition ended, after suffering multiple infections from cutting his foot on a reef.

== Filmography ==
=== Film ===
Year	Film	Role	Notes
2015	Staten Island Summer	Officer Greg Callahan	Also writer
2016	How to Be Single	Paul	
2021	Tom & Jerry	Ben	
2021	Coming 2 America	Calvin Duke	
2024	Will & Harper	Himself	Documentary film
2024	Fly Me to the Moon	Senator Cook	
2025	The Bad Guys 2	Mr. Moon (voice)	First voice role
2026	Love Language	—N/a	Producer only
2026	Lorne	Himself	
2026	The Breadwinner	Conor Ashford	
TBA	Worst Man		Also writer

=== Television ===
Year	Series	Role	Notes
2002	Weakest Link	Himself	Contestant
2005–present	Saturday Night Live	Himself, Various	Also writer
2006	Kappa Mikey	—N/a	Writer; 7 episodes
2017	Saturday Night Live Weekend Update Thursday	Himself	3 episodes; also writer
2018	75th Golden Globe Awards	—N/a	Writer
2018	70th Primetime Emmy Awards	Himself (host)	TV special
2019	WWE Raw	Himself	Special guest (2 episodes)
2019	WrestleMania 35	Himself	Special guest
2020	Impractical Jokers: Dinner Party	Himself	Episode: "The Childhood Meals Episode"
2021	RuPaul's Drag Race	Himself	1 episode
2022	Impractical Jokers	Himself	1 episode
2022	That Damn Michael Che	Michael Che/Himself	Episode: "Black Mediocrity"
2024	White House Correspondents' Dinner	Himself (host)	TV special
2024–present	Pop Culture Jeopardy!	Himself (host)	Amazon Prime Video; Netflix
2026	The Simpsons	Himself (voice)	Episode: "The Children's Book Job"

== Bibliography ==
- "Explaining your Time Warner bill". Shouts & Murmurs. The New Yorker. Vol. 87, no. 7. April 4, 2011. p. 33.
- "A few more bank security questions". Daily Shouts. The New Yorker. July 13, 2012.
- "Olympic story lines to watch". Daily Shouts. The New Yorker. July 16, 2012.
- "Automatic reply". Shouts & Murmurs. The New Yorker. Vol. 88, no. 45. January 28, 2013. p. 30.
- "I will slap you". Shouts & Murmurs. The New Yorker. Vol. 90, no. 47. February 9, 2015. p. 29.
- A Very Punchable Face: A Memoir. Crown. ISBN 1101906324.

== Awards and honors ==
Year	Award	Nominated work	Result	Ref.
2007	Writers Guild of America Award for Comedy/Variety (including talk) series	Saturday Night Live	Won	
2008	Primetime Emmy Award for Outstanding Writing for a Variety, Music, or Comedy Series	Saturday Night Live	Nominated	
2009	Writers Guild of America Award for Comedy/Variety (including talk) series	Saturday Night Live	Won	
2009	Peabody Award	Saturday Night Live	Won	
2009	Primetime Emmy Award for Outstanding Writing for a Variety, Music, or Comedy Series	Saturday Night Live	Nominated	
2010	Writers Guild of America Award for Comedy/Variety (including talk) series	Saturday Night Live	Won	
2010	Primetime Emmy Award for Outstanding Writing for a Variety Series	Saturday Night Live	Nominated	
2011	Writers Guild of America Award for Comedy/Variety (including talk) series	Saturday Night Live	Nominated	
2011	Primetime Emmy Award for Outstanding Writing for a Variety, Music, or Comedy Series	Saturday Night Live	Nominated	
2012	Writers Guild of America Award for Comedy/Variety (including talk) series	Saturday Night Live	Nominated	
2012	Primetime Emmy Award for Outstanding Writing for a Variety Series	Saturday Night Live	Nominated	
2013	Writers Guild of America Award for Comedy/Variety (including talk) series	Saturday Night Live	Nominated	
2013	Primetime Emmy Award for Outstanding Writing for a Variety Series	Saturday Night Live	Nominated	
2013	Primetime Emmy Award for Outstanding Writing for a Variety Special	Saturday Night Live Weekend Update Thursday	Nominated	
2014	Writers Guild of America Award for Comedy/Variety (including talk) series	Saturday Night Live	Nominated	
2015	Writers Guild of America Award for Comedy/Variety (Including Talk) – Series	Saturday Night Live	Nominated	
2016	Writers Guild of America Award for Comedy/Variety – Sketch Series	Saturday Night Live	Nominated	
2016	Primetime Emmy Award for Outstanding Writing for a Variety Series	Saturday Night Live	Nominated	
2017	Writers Guild of America Award for Comedy/Variety – Sketch Series	Saturday Night Live	Won	
2017	Primetime Emmy Award for Outstanding Writing for a Variety Series	Saturday Night Live	Nominated	
2018	Writers Guild of America Award for Comedy/Variety – Sketch Series	Saturday Night Live	Won	
2018	Writers Guild of America Award for Comedy/Variety – Sketch Series	Saturday Night Live Weekend Update Thursday	Nominated	
2018	Primetime Emmy Award for Outstanding Writing for a Variety Series	Saturday Night Live	Nominated	
2019	Writers Guild of America Award for Comedy/Variety – Sketch Series	Saturday Night Live	Nominated	
2019	Primetime Emmy Award for Outstanding Writing for a Variety Series	Saturday Night Live	Nominated	
2020	Writers Guild of America Award for Comedy/Variety – Sketch Series	Saturday Night Live	Nominated	
2021	Primetime Emmy Award for Outstanding Writing for a Variety Series	Saturday Night Live	Nominated	
2022	Primetime Emmy Award for Outstanding Writing for a Variety Series	Saturday Night Live	Nominated	
2023	Primetime Emmy Award for Outstanding Writing for a Variety Series	Saturday Night Live	Nominated	
2024	Primetime Emmy Award for Outstanding Writing for a Variety Series	Saturday Night Live	Nominated	
2025	Primetime Emmy Award for Outstanding Writing for a Variety Series	Saturday Night Live	Nominated	
2025	Primetime Emmy Award for Outstanding Writing for a Variety Special	Saturday Night Live 50th Anniversary Special	Won	
2025	Primetime Emmy Award for Outstanding Variety Special (Live)	Saturday Night Live 50th Anniversary Special	Won	
2025	Primetime Emmy Award for Outstanding Host for a Game Show	Pop Culture Jeopardy!	Nominated	

Media offices
Preceded by Seth Meyers	SNL Head Writer with Seth Meyers; 2012–14	Succeeded by himself (with Rob Klein and Bryan Tucker)
Preceded by Seth Meyers and himself	SNL Head Writer (with Rob Klein and Bryan Tucker); 2014–15	Succeeded by Rob Klein and Bryan Tucker
Preceded by Seth Meyers and Cecily Strong	Weekend Update anchor with Cecily Strong; March 1 – May 17, 2014; September 27, 2014 – present With: Michael Che	Succeeded by Incumbent
Preceded by Chris Kelly, Sarah Schneider, Bryan Tucker, and Kent Sublette	SNL Head Writer (with Michael Che, Bryan Tucker, and Kent Sublette); December 16, 2017 – May 19, 2018	Succeeded by himself (with Michael Che and Kent Sublette)
Preceded by Himself, Michael Che, Bryan Tucker, and Kent Sublette	SNL Head Writer (with Michael Che, and Kent Sublette); September 29, 2018 – May 9, 2020	Succeeded by Himself (with Michael Che, Kent Sublette, and Anna Drezen)
Preceded by Himself, Michael Che, and Kent Sublette	SNL Head Writer (with Michael Che, Kent Sublette, and Anna Drezen); October 3, 2020 – December 18, 2021	Succeeded by Himself (with Michael Che, Kent Sublette, Alison Gates, and Streeter Seidell)
Preceded by Himself, Michael Che, Kent Sublette, and Anna Drezen	SNL Head Writer (with Michael Che, Kent Sublette, Alison Gates, and Streeter Seidell); January 15 – May 21, 2022	Succeeded by Kent Sublette, Alison Gates, and Streeter Seidell
