= That Damn Michael Che =

2021 American sketch comedy television series

- Genre: Sketch comedy
- Created by: Michael Che
- Starring: Michael Che
- Country of origin: United States
- Original language: English
- No. of seasons: 2
- No. of episodes: 12

Production
- Executive producers: Michael Che; Erin Doyle; Lorne Michaels; Oz Rodriguez
- Running time: 30 minutes
- Production companies: Broadway Video; Leather Suit Inc.; Irony Point; Samana Pictures; Universal Television

Original release
- Network: HBO Max
- Release: May 6, 2021 – May 26, 2022

That Damn Michael Che is an American sketch comedy television series created by and starring Michael Che that premiered on HBO Max on May 6, 2021. In July 2021, the series was renewed for a second season.

== Premise ==
Each episode follows a theme or incident (police brutality, unemployment, falling in love, etc.) and uses sketches and vignettes to illustrate what it feels like to experience this from a black vantage point.

== Cast ==
=== Main ===
- Michael Che

=== Guest ===
- Cecily Strong
- Heidi Gardner
- Colin Quinn
- Ellen Cleghorne
- Colin Jost
- Omari Hardwick
- Geoffrey Owens
- Godfrey
- Billy Porter
- Method Man
- Chris Distefano
- Anna Drezen
- Ziwe Fumudoh
- Wayne Brady
- David Allen Grier
- Tim Meadows
- Kenan Thompson

== Episodes ==
=== Series overview ===
Season	Episodes	Originally released
1	6	May 6, 2021
2	6	May 26, 2022

=== Season 1 (2021) ===
No. overall	No. in season	Title	Directed by	Original release date
1	1	"Policin'"	Oz Rodriguez	May 6, 2021
2	2	"Bourbon & Water"	Oz Rodriguez	May 6, 2021
3	3	"Dudley Gets Shot"	Oz Rodriguez	May 6, 2021
4	4	"Sex Worker"	Oz Rodriguez	May 6, 2021
5	5	"Well Played, Crackers"	Oz Rodriguez	May 6, 2021
6	6	"Only Built 4 Leather Suits"	Oz Rodriguez	May 6, 2021

=== Season 2 (2022) ===
No. overall	No. in season	Title	Directed by	Original release date
7	1	"Join the Club"	Alice Mathias & Gary Richardson	May 26, 2022
8	2	"Intervention"	Alice Mathias & Gary Richardson	May 26, 2022
9	3	"Black Mediocrity"	Alice Mathias & Gary Richardson	May 26, 2022
10	4	"Higher Power"	Alice Mathias & Gary Richardson	May 26, 2022
11	5	"Your Past, Your Present"	Alice Mathias & Gary Richardson	May 26, 2022
12	6	"Ballad of a Thin Man"	Alice Mathias & Gary Richardson	May 26, 2022

== Production ==
=== Development ===
On July 14, 2020, HBO Max gave the then-untitled project a series order consisting of 6 half-hour episodes. The series is created by Michael Che, who also executive produces alongside Lorne Michaels and Erin Doyle. Che, speaking about the project, said: "I'm really excited to be working on this show with HBO Max. It's a project I've been thinking about for a while and we have a lot of sketches we want to shoot so please wear your masks so that we can go into production." On April 19, 2021, it was announced that the series was to be titled That Damn Michael Che and would premiere on May 6, 2021. On July 22, 2021, HBO Max renewed the series for a second season.

=== Casting ===
Alongside the initial series order announcement, Che was announced to star in the series. On April 19, 2021, it was announced that Cecily Strong, Heidi Gardner, Colin Quinn, Ellen Cleghorne, and Colin Jost had joined the main cast, with Omari Hardwick, Geoffrey Owens, Godfrey, Billy Porter, and Method Man set to guest star.

=== Filming ===
The first season was shot throughout New York, with filming commencing on November 9, 2020, and wrapping on February 1, 2021.

== Music ==
The theme song for season 1 was "You Can't Stop Us Now" from Nas's untitled album. In season 2, the theme song was "You and Your Folks, Me and My Folks" from Funkadelic's album Maggot Brain.
