= Pop Culture Jeopardy! =

American television quiz show

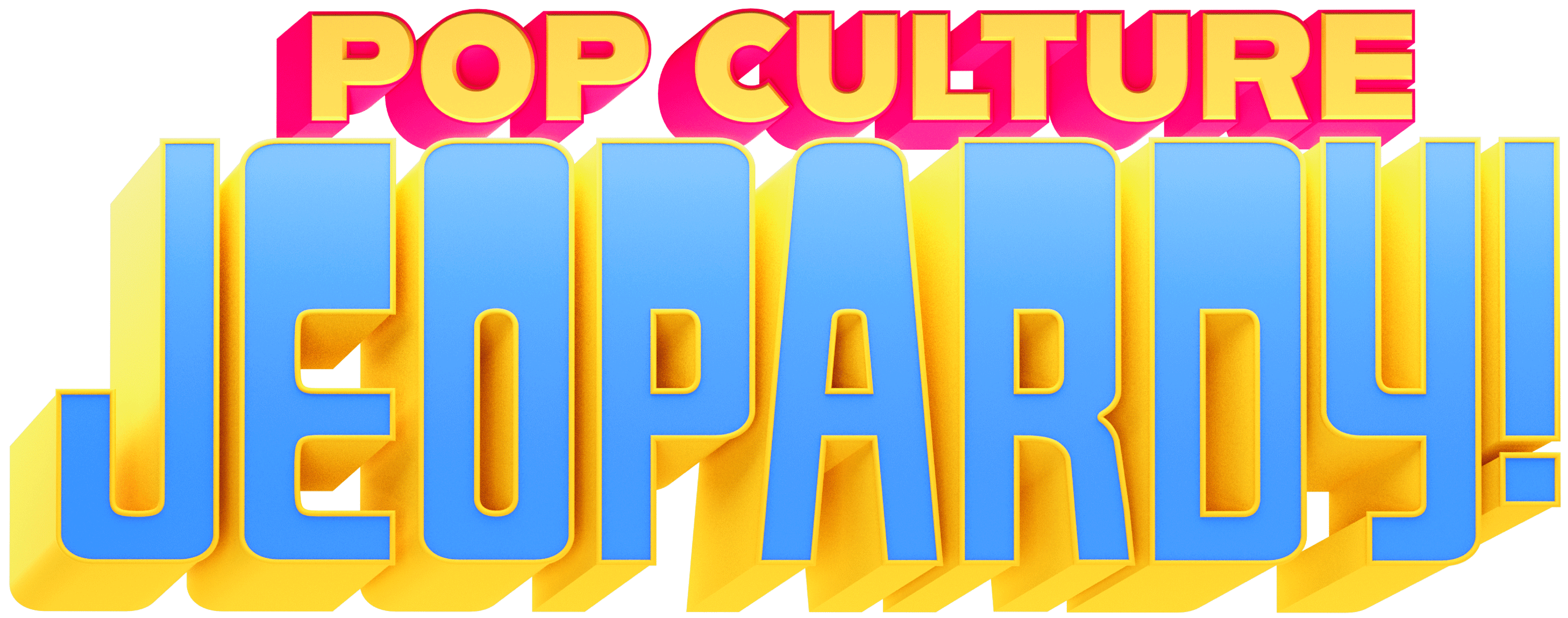
- Genre: Game show
- Created by: Merv Griffin
- Directed by: Lucinda Owens Margolis
- Presented by: Colin Jost
- Announcer: Johnny Gilbert
- Ending theme: "Think!"
- Composers: John Hoke (Bleeding Fingers Music); Chris Bell Music & Sound Design (Note: Original theme composed by Merv Griffin)
- Country of origin: United States
- Original language: English
- No. of seasons: 2
- No. of episodes: 60

Production
- Executive producer: Michael Davies
- Producers: Sarah Whitcomb Foss; Sabrina Hybel Snow
- Production companies: Sony Pictures (Note: As Sony Pictures Television in seasons 1 and 2); Amazon MGM Studios (season 1)

Original release
- Network: Amazon Prime Video
- Release: December 3, 2024 – March 5, 2025
- Network: Netflix
- Release: May 11, 2026 – present

Related
- Jeopardy!

Pop Culture Jeopardy! is an American game show and Jeopardy! spinoff. In contrast to the original series, gameplay features teams rather than individual contestants, and material is focused specifically on popular culture rather than general knowledge. The first season was released on Amazon Prime Video from December 3, 2024, to March 5, 2025, while a second season has been streaming on Netflix since May 11, 2026.

== Format ==
In the first season of the show, gameplay consists of a bracket tournament with four rounds. Eighty-one teams of three players compete in twenty-seven knockout round games, with the winners of each game advancing to the quarterfinals. The winning teams in these nine quarterfinal games advance to three semifinal games. The winners of each semifinal game advance to the finals, where the winning team receives a $300,000 grand prize, with each player receiving $100,000. Third place in the finals earns $50,000 ($16,666 per player), while second place earns $100,000 ($33,333 per player).

In the second season, the format is changed to feature 15 "regular-season" episodes where the winning team of each episode continues to the next episode (up to a five game win limit), with a total of up to thirty teams of two players, followed by a five-episode "postseason" tournament where the nine teams with the longest winning streaks (and, if any, remaining non-winning teams based on tie-breaking criteria in order of number of correct responses and scores, excluding Final Jeopardy!) return to compete against each other to determine the season's winners. Teams now comprise two players rather than three. The prize money is adjusted to $150,000 for each player for the winning team in the finals.

== Gameplay ==
The structure of each episode is similar to the regular Jeopardy! show. The "Jeopardy!" round is played with clues ranging from 200 to 1000 points, with one Daily Double hidden among them, allowing whoever selects it to wager some or all of their score on the clue. It is followed by the "Double Jeopardy!" round, where clue values are doubled and there are two hidden Daily Double clues. On regular clues, contestants ring in individually, with the host calling on that specific player, and may not confer with each other. An incorrect response by a contestant locks out that contestant's teammates for the remainder of the clue. On Daily Doubles, teammates are allowed to confer on both the wager and the response, with the contestant who selected the Daily Double announcing both.

Unlike traditional Jeopardy!, which is scored in dollars, all of the games in this tournament are scored in points, just like in Jep!, Super Jeopardy!, the first two seasons of Rock & Roll Jeopardy!, Sports Jeopardy!, Jeopardy! The Greatest of All Time, and Jeopardy! Masters.

In the first season, Pop Culture Jeopardy! games include a unique game element called the Triple Play. The board contains one Triple Play clue in each of the "Jeopardy!" and "Double Jeopardy!" round. Each Triple Play clue has three correct responses and begins as a toss-up for all players. When a contestant rings in and provides a correct response, their next teammate (in a preset order) has the opportunity to provide another correct response, rotating through the team until all correct responses are given or an incorrect response is given. When an incorrect response is given, the remaining teams have the opportunity to ring in and begin their own rotation of giving responses. Each correct response is worth the face value of the clue and each incorrect response is worth minus the face value of the clue, so a team can score up to triple the clue's face value. The second season of the show does not feature Triple Play clues.

"Final Jeopardy!" is played after the second round. Teams will first receive the category, then wager any amount from 0 to their current score. They then receive the clue and must write their response in 30 seconds. Teams' wagers are added to their score if they were correct, and subtracted if they were incorrect. The team with the highest score at the end of "Final Jeopardy!" wins the game.

== Series overview ==
Season	Episodes	Originally released		
Season	Episodes	First released	Last released	Network
1	40	December 3, 2024	March 5, 2025	Amazon Prime Video
2	20	May 11, 2026	June 5, 2026	Netflix

== Production ==
In May 2024, Amazon ordered a spinoff of Jeopardy! that would become the first series in the franchise to debut for a streaming service. The series would be produced by both format-owner Sony Pictures Television and Amazon MGM Studios, with regular series executive producer Michael Davies once again serving as the executive producer for this series. In August 2024, it was announced that longtime Saturday Night Live member Colin Jost would host the spinoff. A trailer for the series was released in November 2024, which also announced that the series premiere was set for December 3 of that year. 40 episodes were confirmed to air for season 1.

In October 2025, it was announced that the show was renewed for a second season and would move to Netflix. The second season premiered on May 11, 2026, with episodes airing every weekday until June 5. Twenty episodes were aired in total during this season, with Cartuna producing the season's opening titles.
