= Tom Flanigan (writer) =

American actor, writer and comedian

Tom Flanigan is an American actor, writer and comedian.

He grew up in Eden, NY, south of Buffalo in western New York state. He attended the University of Iowa where he majored in Biomedical Engineering and was a member, director, and producer of the improvisational comedy troupe IC Improvs. Flanigan graduated with a B.S. in 1996 and moved to Chicago, where he was employed by Andersen Consulting. He attended classes at The Second City and was later hired as a member of the Training Center faculty.

In 1998, Flanigan (with Ronnie Feldman and Matt Hovde) co-founded Galileo Players, a sketch comedy troupe inspired by science.

Between 2008 and 2010, as a member of The Second City e.t.c. ensemble, Flanigan helped create the revues "Campaign Supernova", "Brother, Can You Spare Some Change?", "Studs Terkel's Not Working", and "The Absolute Best Friggin' Time of Your Life"

Flanigan was hired as a writer for Season 36 of Saturday Night Live in August 2010.
