= Kent Sublette =

American comedy writer (born 1969)

- Born: 1969 (age 56–57)
- Occupation: Writer
- Known for: Head writer for Saturday Night Live (2017–present)

Kent Sublette (born 1969) is an American comedy writer who is currently a head writer for the NBC sketch comedy show Saturday Night Live. He previously performed with the Groundlings comedy troupe in Los Angeles.

== Early life ==
Sublette grew up in Roanoke, Virginia, the son of Helen and Allan Sublette. His mother was a teacher, and his father worked for an envelope company. In his teenage years, he began acting at the local Showtimers Community Theatre and later the Mill Mountain Theatre. He graduated from Northside High School in 1987. He majored in musical theater at Syracuse University, graduating in 1991.

== Career ==
=== Early career ===
Sublette moved to New York City after college to pursue a Broadway career, but discovered he was "not as good of a singer and dancer as he thought he was". After one year of unsuccessful auditions, he moved to Los Angeles and initially worked as a production assistant and writer of infomercials. He began training in improvisational and sketch comedy with the Groundlings at age 27. He was promoted to their Sunday company in 2002, where he wrote and performed sketches alongside future SNL cast member Kristen Wiig, and later joined the main company, where he performed alongside Wiig and Melissa McCarthy. In 2004, he was part of the cast of the Fox reality series My Big Fat Obnoxious Boss.

=== Saturday Night Live ===
In 2007, Sublette was hired into the writing room at Saturday Night Live before the show's 33rd season. He had had a two-week guest stint the previous season thanks to Wiig's recommendation. During his early years at SNL, he and James Anderson often wrote together with Wiig, who described him as "really good at writing characters ... Sitting in a room with him ... you feel comfortable trying out voices and saying, 'What about this?' … He's so supportive, and you find things together". After her departure, Sublette and Anderson often wrote for Cecily Strong.

In January 2017, during SNL's 42nd season, Sublette was promoted to co-head writer, joining Sarah Schneider, Chris Kelly, and Bryan Tucker. During that season, he co-wrote a critically admired series of sketches featuring his former Groundlings co-star Melissa McCarthy as the White House press secretary Sean Spicer. Having received more than 15 previous Primetime Emmy Award nominations, he won his first Emmy for his work on SNL's 50th Anniversary Special in 2025.

=== Other work ===
Sublette wrote the screenplay for the film Lucky (2011), starring Colin Hanks and directed by his former Syracuse classmate Gil Cates Jr. Over the following years, he contributed uncredited writing to several Paul Feig films starring his former Groundlings co-stars Wiig or McCarthy, including Bridesmaids (2011), The Heat (2013), Spy (2015), and the Ghostbusters reboot (2016). He wrote the screenplay for The Parenting (2025) directed by Craig Johnson.

== Personal life ==
Sublette is married and lives in Manhattan.
