= Anna Drezen =

American writer, actress, and comedian

- Born: Long Island, New York, U.S.
- Occupations: Writer; actress; comedian
- Years active: 2013–present

Anna Drezen is an American writer, actress, and comedian who has written for television comedies like Miracle Workers, Girls5eva, Murderville, and Saturday Night Live, where she served as Head Writer during seasons 46 and 47. She is the creator of the Freeform series Praise Petey.

== Personal life ==
A native of Long Island, Drezen grew up in Massapequa, New York and has identified herself as "half-Jewish." She graduated from New York University's Tisch School of the Arts in 2010 where she studied drama. She subsequently earned a certificate in Shakespeare in Performance from the Royal Academy of Dramatic Art. Her mother Irene (née Roarke) is a nurse and her father Warren is a pharmacist and the retired Director of Pharmacy at South Oaks Hospital in Amityville, New York; he accompanied her to the 2019 Emmy Awards show. Her older brother is comic artist Rich Drezen. She has a dog named Lady Bird, a Chihuahua-Terrier mix named after the former first lady Lady Bird Johnson.

== Career ==
Drezen was an editor at large of the feminist humor site Reductress and co-wrote the book How to Win at Feminism: The Definitive Guide to Having it All—And Then Some! with the site's founders Beth Newell and Sarah Pappalardo. She also coauthored the book How May We Hate You? with Todd Dakotah Briscoe. The latter book began as a blog inspired by Drezen's time as a hotel concierge in New York City. She has written and performed on Manhattan Neighborhood Network's The Special Without Brett Davis. She was editor and writer at humor website Cracked.com until 2016.

She is a member of the Upright Citizens Brigade Theatre (UCB). Together with fellow UCB performer Taylor Moore, Drezen hosted the podcast Ten Ideas from 2013 to 2016.

Drezen was hired as a staff writer on Saturday Night Live for the show's 42nd season. She was made Supervising Writer for seasons 44 and 45, and since the show's 46th season has served as Head Writer alongside Michael Che, Colin Jost, and Kent Sublette. Drezen and the SNL writing staff have been nominated for the Primetime Emmy Award for Outstanding Writing for a Variety Series in 2017, 2018, 2019, and 2021.

In 2019, Drezen began hosting the podcast Scary Stories to Tell on the Pod with writer Andrew Farmer, was a guest on Drunk Women Solving Crime, and performed on The Late Late Show with James Corden on 24 September 2019.

At the 2019 Edinburgh Festival Fringe, Drezen premiered Okay, Get Home Safe, a one-woman show inspired by her obsession with true crime podcasts.

Drezen has been a writer on shows like Girls5Eva and Miracle Workers, the latter on which she also appeared as an actor.

In 2021, Freeform ordered an animated series called Praise Petey. created by Drezen, which she executive produces alongside Greg Daniels, Mike Judge, and Monica Padrick. Annie Murphy, John Cho, Christine Baranski, Kiersey Clemons, Amy Hill, and Stephen Root led the voice cast. The series was produced by 20th Television Animation, with animation by ShadowMachine. She departed SNL after the December 18, 2021 episode in preparation. It premiered on July 21, 2023. In November 2023, it was announced that Freeform had cancelled the series after 1 season.
