= Bryan Tucker =

American screenwriter

Bryan H. Tucker
- Born: Chesterfield County, Virginia, U.S.
- Education: University of North Carolina at Chapel Hill
- Occupations: Screenwriter, comedian, actor
- Known for: Senior writer (and former co-head writer) for Saturday Night Live
- Notable work: Saturday Night Live; Chappelle's Show; The Chris Rock Show; Mad TV
- Awards: 3 Writers Guild of America Awards (2007, 2009, 2010); Peabody Award (2008); Primetime Emmy Award (2025)

Bryan H. Tucker is an American actor, comedian, and screenwriter. He has been a senior writer for the TV program Saturday Night Live since 2018.

== Early life ==
Bryan H. Tucker was born and raised in Chesterfield County, Virginia. After graduating from Clover Hill High School, Tucker attended the University of North Carolina at Chapel Hill. While at UNC, Tucker regularly performed stand-up comedy and formed the comedy troupe Selected Hilarity.

== Career ==
After graduating from UNC, Tucker toured the country with Selected Hilarity for three years. The group broke up and Tucker moved to New York City to pursue performing. After Tucker broke into the standup scene, he would go on to write sketches and comedy bits for The Chris Rock Show. He then went on to work for Mad TV, Tough Crowd with Colin Quinn, and Chappelle's Show before getting a job as an SNL writer in 2005. After Seth Meyers left in the middle of Season 39 to host Late Night with Seth Meyers, both Rob Klein and Bryan Tucker were promoted to become new co-head writers alongside Colin Jost. However, as of 2018, Tucker is a senior writer at the show. Although his primary function on the show has always been as a writer, Tucker has appeared in several bit performances, including "Roy Rules," an early SNL Digital Short.

== Awards and honors ==
Tucker has been nominated for nineteen Emmy awards and three Writers Guild (WGA) awards (2007, 2009, 2010) and won a Peabody Award for his work on Saturday Night Live during the 2008 Presidential Election. On September 7, 2025, Tucker won an Emmy in the Outstanding Writing for a Variety Special category for his contributions to the Saturday Night Live Anniversary Special.
