= Alison Gates =

American comedy writer and actress

- Born: 1989 (age 36–37); Massachusetts, U.S.
- Education: Yale University
- Occupations: Comedian; writer; actress

Alison Gates (born 1988 or 1989) is an American comedy writer and actress who is currently a head writer for Saturday Night Live. She previously lived in Chicago and worked with the Second City's touring company and an all-female iO Theater troupe.

== Career ==
=== Improvisational theatre ===
Born and raised in Wellesley, Massachusetts, Gates said she started doing improvisational theatre in high school, and then continued "in college sort of as a way to meet people." She was part of Yale's oldest improv comedy troupe, The Yale Ex!t Players. At Yale University Gates, who plays guitar and mandolin, performed in Measure for Measure among other shows. She was also a managing editor of The Yale Record humor magazine and graduated from Yale in 2011.

When you get to know other performers in your cast and know their voices and sense of humor, it can be so fun to write pieces that showcase those things. That can be more freeing than writing material for yourself.

— Gates on her writing process at the Second City

After moving to Chicago, Gates began to take improv "a little more seriously" and, after going through the Second City's conservatory program, was hired by the Second City after its annual general audition, eventually moving from understudy to part of the BlueCo touring company in 2015.

She said that "one of the great things about performing at Second City" was getting to continually "make tweaks and re-improvise" scenes after having planned with fellow cast members and performed in front of an audience. While with Second City, Gates said that "my dream job would be writing instead of performing".

In Chicago, Gates was also a member of Virgin Daiquiri, an all-female iO improv group. She also performed with Casual Encounters for iO, Shinbone Alley for Chemically Imbalanced Comedy, and the Fallen Elegant.

=== Saturday Night Live ===
At an iO showcase before the forty-fourth season of Saturday Night Live, NBC's long-running sketch comedy show, Gates performed pieces about "a plantation docent describing her awful life, a teacher humiliated by a fall in front of the class, and White House advisor Stephen Miller," according to the Chicago Sun-Times. Gates was announced as a new SNL writer on September 21, 2018.

After her fourth week at SNL, Gates was noted for her sketch "Teacher Fell Down," which Alison Herman of The Ringer called "a gloriously weird bit from the Jonah Hill episode centering on [Kate] McKinnon's drama queen of a driver's ed instructor,"

She is a head writer for the show as of the second half of the show's 47th season.
