= Diner Lobster =

2018 Saturday Night Live comedy sketch

- Saturday Night Live segment
- Cecily Strong, Kenan Thompson, and John Mulaney in their roles as the cook, lobster, and waiter, respectively
- Episode no.: Season 43; Episode 18 (segment)
- Written by: John Mulaney and Colin Jost
- Original air date: April 14, 2018

"Diner Lobster" is a comedy sketch that aired on Saturday Night Live (SNL) on April 14, 2018. Originally written by John Mulaney and Colin Jost for a 2010 episode, the sketch features a man who, after ordering a lobster from a dingy New York Greek diner, is warned by the denizens of the diner to change his order through parodies of the songs from Les Misérables. The sketch did not make it past the table read, but was revived when Mulaney returned to host SNL eight years later, starring Pete Davidson as the man ordering the lobster.

"Diner Lobster" received generally positive reviews, with commentators praising its high production value and 2000s-SNL quality. Some named it the best SNL sketch of the year, or among the best. In Mulaney's subsequent stints as a host, the show featured sequel sketches that followed the same basic structure, including "Bodega Bathroom", "Airport Sushi", "New York Musical", "Subway Churro", and "Port Authority Duane Reade". Reviewers found the sequels to be good but inferior to the original, characterizing them as less focused.

== Background ==
"Diner Lobster" was written in 2010 by John Mulaney and Colin Jost, then both staff writers at Saturday Night Live. The sketch was written for an episode hosted by Zach Galifianakis, and would have featured him as the Jean Valjean–esque lobster in the sketch, eventually played by Kenan Thompson. However, the sketch never made it past the table read for that week's episode. Jost would later say of the original table read, "The read-through is usually around 40 sketches. You can sometimes have a sketch and it's just in a weird place in the read-through, where maybe the sketch before had something strange in it that threw the room off. Or it's late in the read-through and people are tired. [Diner Lobster] never ignited people. It just didn't work as a sketch at the table read." When Mulaney returned to host the show in 2018, a revised version of the sketch was produced for the episode, alongside another sketch he wrote during his tenure as an SNL writer ("Switcheroo", written with Simon Rich and Marika Sawyer).

== Synopsis ==
Two men sit down in a New York City diner, where a waiter (played by Mulaney) begins to take the customers' orders. One of the men (played by Pete Davidson) shocks both his friend (played by Chris Redd) and the waiter by deciding to order the lobster off the menu. After his friend and the waiter try and fail to persuade him to order something else, the waiter calls in the order. The back of the set opens to reveal a lobster (played by Kenan Thompson) dressed as Jean Valjean from the Les Misérables musical in a water tank. The lobster begins to sing a parody of "Who Am I", lamenting his fate of being eaten, eventually being accompanied by the waiter and a cook (played by Cecily Strong). Clawsette (a crustacean version of Cosette, played by Kate McKinnon) enters and begins to sing a parody of "Castle on a Cloud", mourning the loss of her father. After Davidson's character refuses to change his order, the waiter and cook make a call to "form the barricade!" An elaborate barricade set piece is moved onto the set, causing Davidson's character to remark that the diner has "incredible set design". The waiter, cook, and lobster make one last plea for the lobster's life, leading a small ensemble in a parody of "Do You Hear the People Sing?" This causes Davidson's character to change his mind and order the veal instead.

== Sequels ==
Mulaney returned to host SNL on several subsequent occasions, each time bringing a new sketch following the same basic structure as the first; two men are in a classic New York City setting that is both loved and hated when one attempts to do something locals know is inconceivable and unsanitary for that institution, leading to parodies of several Broadway musical numbers. His next stint as host was in 2019, which featured "Bodega Bathroom", starring the same cast. Pete Davidson's character asks if he can use the restroom at a bodega, leading to songs from Rent, Willy Wonka & the Chocolate Factory, Cats, and Little Shop of Horrors (Kenan Thompson plays a bodega cat).

"Airport Sushi", which aired in early March 2020, again starred the same cast with Mulaney hosting the episode. Pete Davidson's character tries to purchase sushi at LaGuardia Airport, leading to not only parodies of Phantom of the Opera, West Side Story, Annie, and Wicked (guest starring actor Jake Gyllenhaal), but also David Byrne of Talking Heads playing a parody of the group's single, "Road to Nowhere". Late in the same year, amidst the upcoming 2020 United States presidential election and the ongoing COVID-19 pandemic, Mulaney hosted again, mixing up the conventional setting with "New York Musical". The sketch praises New York City and rejects then-President Donald Trump's characterization of it as a "ghost town", as Pete Davidson's character attempts to buy a pair of "I Love New York" underpants from Times Square, leading to parodies of A Chorus Line, Fiddler on the Roof, and (among other musicals) Les Misérables again (Kenan Thompson plays a Minion).

"Subway Churro" aired in 2022 with Mulaney's return; Andrew Dismukes plays the protagonist, who attempts to buy a churro in a subway station. LCD Soundsystem makes an appearance as the Guardian Angels, and the cast performs a parody of "Superstar" from Jesus Christ Superstar (Kenan Thompson plays a mole person). Pete Davidson returned to the main character role in the "Port Authority Duane Reade" installment, which aired in 2024. Davidson's character attempts to buy milk from a Duane Reade store in the Port Authority Bus Terminal, leading parodies of The Lion King (Kenan Thompson plays a possum) and Hamilton (Andy Samberg sings as the dead bear dumped by Robert F. Kennedy Jr. in Central Park).

A sixth edition of the recurring sketch, entitled "New York 50th Musical", aired as a part of the SNL 50th Anniversary Special in February 2025. The sketch featured Mulaney leading characters played by Davidson and David Spade through various decades of New York City history and culture. Parodies of songs from Fame, Les Misérables, and Little Shop of Horrors were sung by various performers including Adam Driver, Maya Rudolph, Jason Sudeikis, Will Forte, Kristen Wiig, Scarlett Johansson, and Paul Rudd. Nathan Lane performed a parody of "Hakuna Matata" (a song he sang in The Lion King) alongside Chloe Fineman, and Kate McKinnon reprised her impression of Rudy Giuliani to perform a parody of "My Shot", eventually being joined by Hamilton's composer Lin-Manuel Miranda. The sketch's finale, featuring the Les Misérables song "One Day More," saw Kenan Thompson return as the titular Diner Lobster from the original 2018 sketch.

A seventh edition of the sketch, “Central Park Horse & Carriage Ride,” aired when Mulaney hosted on November 14, 2026. Mulaney plays a carriage driver taking two New Jersey tourists, played by Marcello Hernández and Kam Patterson, through Central Park, as he introduces them to a succession of New York characters about the banning of horse carriage rides in Central Park. Parodies of songs from Little Shop of Horrors, Funny Girl, Annie Get Your Gun, Cats, West Side Story, and Hair are sung by cast members Veronika Slowikowska, Tommy Brennan, Kenan Thompson, Sarah Sherman, Grace Reiter, Saidah Belo-Osagie, James Austin Johnson, and Jeremy Culhane. Bowen Yang then appears as the “Mary Todd Lincoln Tunnel,” combining his Oh, Mary! character with a joke about escaping Manhattan traffic. The sketch ends with a callback to Ashley Padilla’s intrusive coworker character, Kathy, who returns when the conversation turns to transportation.

== Reception and legacy ==
Reception for "Diner Lobster" was generally positive, with reviewers praising its absurdity, ambitious production choices, and musical theater knowledge. Joe Reid noted in Primetimer that the sketch was written before, and aired five years after, the release of the 2012 film adaptation of Les Misérables, giving it a niche appeal to Broadway fans as opposed to contemporary pop culture reliance. David Sims of The Atlantic expressed nostalgia for the earlier generation of SNL the sketch came from, writing that "there's a sad irony ... to the fact that two of last weekend's best sketches were written almost a decade ago". Reid agreed, arguing the sketch could have been better if it starred SNL alumni such as Andy Samberg or Kristen Wiig. Sims and Garrett Martin of Paste also laughingly noted the relatively small core observation of the sketch compared to the massive production value meant to emphasize it. Reviewers for Paste, Vulture, and The Washington Post ranked "Diner Lobster" as the best SNL sketch of the year; reviewers for Mashable ranked it fifth.

The sequels were also received positively, although less so. Travis M. Andrews of The Washington Post positively reviewed the Mulaney tradition as a whole, saying that its infrequency and absurdity made it stand out compared to what he criticized as the show's routine cold open. David Sims likewise referred to "Airport Sushi" as "the best Saturday Night Live has been this season". Joe Reid and Garrett Martin, however, both noted "Bodega Bathroom"'s similarities to "Diner Lobster", but criticized it for scattering the songs across multiple musicals, arguing that it sapped some of the focus and absurdity.

Kenan Thompson used the episode containing "Diner Lobster" as his submission for a Primetime Emmy Award for Outstanding Supporting Actor in a Comedy Series in 2018; he also participated in another sketch in the episode, a parody on Wild Wild Country. Thompson received a nomination, but the award went to Henry Winkler. The sketch itself was given the "Best Variety Sketch" award by the animal rights organization People for the Ethical Treatment of Animals for "highlighting the excruciating pain that crustaceans feel when boiled alive".
