= List of celebrities who unsuccessfully auditioned for Saturday Night Live =

The following is a list of actors, comedians and celebrities who auditioned for a part in the NBC sketch comedy series Saturday Night Live but were not cast in the show. Many of these celebrities managed to achieve successful careers in the entertainment industry, with some of them eventually appearing on the show as a guest host or in some other capacity. This list is in alphabetical order by last name.

== A ==
- Jennifer Aniston auditioned in 1990 after being offered a spot on the cast by Lorne Michaels, she ultimately turned it down. She hosted the show twice, during its 25th season and 29th season.
- Dave Attell auditioned in 1993, but was hired as a writer for the show during its 19th season instead.

== B ==
- Greer Barnes auditioned in 1995.
- Charlie Barnett auditioned in 1980, but passed it up because he was self-conscious about his inability to read.
- Richard Belzer claimed that series creator Lorne Michaels promised to cast him in the show but later changed his mind.
- Rachel Bloom auditioned in 2012.
- Kevin Brennan auditioned for a part in the Weekend Update after Colin Quinn left the show. Brennan was a writer for the show's 25th season.
- Nicole Byer auditioned in 2013 when the show was looking to add an African-American woman to the cast but lost to Sasheer Zamata.

== C ==
- Steve Carell auditioned in 1995 alongside his wife, Nancy Walls, who was ultimately hired. He went on to host the show three times in 2005, 2008 and 2018.
- Jim Carrey auditioned in 1980 and 1986. He went on to host the show three times in 1996, 2011 and 2014. Lorne Michaels regrets not hiring Carrey.
- Louis C.K. auditioned in 1993. He went on to host the show four times.
- Stephen Colbert auditioned in 1992.
- Dane Cook turned down joining the show in 1996. He went on to host the show in season 31 and season 32.
- Jennifer Coolidge auditioned in 1995.
- David Cross auditioned in 1992.

== D ==
- Tommy Davidson auditioned in 1987 but was passed over when Lorne Michaels told him they were "not looking for a black comedian".
- Geena Davis auditioned in 1984 but lost the part to Pamela Stephenson. She later hosted in 1989.
- Gabrielle Dennis auditioned in 2013 when the show was looking to add an African-American woman to the cast but lost to Sasheer Zamata.
- Andy Dick was approached to join the cast shortly after cancellation of The Ben Stiller Show in 1993. However, he turned down the offer due to the lack of confidence of performing every week; he later regretted the decision.
- Paul W. Downs had a screen test in 2005, claiming because someone working on the show had seen a sketch of his.
- Fran Drescher auditioned for the show and received a callback, but because she'd just moved to California and wasn't a "late-night person," she didn't end up continuing.

== F ==
- Ana Fabrega took part in a talent showcase for a chance to audition for the show's 52nd season.
- Pat Finn auditioned in 1995.
- Dave Foley auditioned in 1985.

== G ==
- Zach Galifianakis auditioned in 1999. He was eventually hired to write for two episodes of the show's 25th season. He also hosted the show three times in 2010, 2011 and 2013.
- Jon Glaser auditioned in 1995.
- Donald Glover auditioned twice for the show only to lose the parts to Bobby Moynihan and Fred Armisen. He eventually hosted the show in 2018.
- Godfrey revealed on the Jim Norton Can't Save You podcast that he auditioned in 1998 and received a standing ovation but was never called back. He was later told by Darrell Hammond he was considered but ultimately rejected to prevent another Eddie Murphy-like situation.
- Elon Gold auditioned in 1995.
- John Goodman auditioned in 1980. He later went on to host the show thirteen times.
- Charlie Grandy was considered to replace Tina Fey as Weekend Update anchor while he was a writer on the show in 2006.
- Kathy Griffin auditioned in 1990 but lost the part to Julia Sweeney.

== H ==
- Tiffany Haddish auditioned in 2013 when the show was looking to add an African-American woman to the cast but lost to Sasheer Zamata. She later hosted the show during the 43rd season.
- Ricky Harris auditioned in 1995.
- Kevin Hart auditioned for a part in the show in 2001. He went on to host the show three times (2013, 2015 and 2017).
- Caleb Hearon auditioned twice in 2019 and 2022.
- Rob Huebel auditioned more than once during the mid-2000s. His comedy partner, Rob Riggle, was chosen as a cast member for the 2004-2005 season (season 30).
- Bonnie Hunt was approached to join the cast in the early 1990s, but turned down the offer due to the "gender disparity" on the show at the time. In addition, Lorne Michaels was against Hunt improvising in her audition, because of his strict "no improv" policy on the show.
- Anjelica Huston was asked by Lorne Michaels personally to become a cast member for the show's eleventh season according to cast member Dan Vitale, but she ultimately declined.

== J ==
- Kevin James auditioned for the show in the mid-1990s.
- Anthony Jeselnik was considered to replace Cecily Strong and Colin Jost as a solo Weekend Update anchor in 2014.
- Jake Johannsen was considered to replace Colin Quinn as Weekend Update anchor in 2000.

== K ==
- Mindy Kaling auditioned to join the cast of Saturday Night Live in 2005, but was only offered the chance to write for the show, which she turned down.
- Andy Kaufman auditioned for a spot on the original cast.
- Chris Kelly was considered to replace Cecily Strong as Weekend Update anchor while he was a writer on the show in 2014.
- Ellie Kemper auditioned in 2008. She later appeared on the show during the monologue of an episode hosted by her The Office co-star Steve Carell.
- Mimi Kennedy was offered a part in the show in 1975, but Gilda Radner was worried that they were both too similar to each other.
- Kerri Kenney-Silver auditioned in 1996.
- Tom Kenny auditioned in 1990.
- Johnny Knoxville was offered the chance to have his stunt videos (which would later be used on the MTV show Jackass) put on SNL, but he declined the offer. He later hosted the show in 2005.
- Nick Kroll auditioned in 2008.
- Lisa Kudrow auditioned in 1990. She later hosted the show in 1996.

== L ==
- Jay Lacopo auditioned in 1995.
- Lauren Lapkus auditioned in 2012.
- Ismael Loutfi auditioned in 2026.

== M ==
- Bill Maher was in talks to join the 1994 season.
- Marc Maron auditioned in 1995 in an attempt to replace Norm Macdonald on Weekend Update.
- Andrea Martin auditioned in 1984 but lost the part to Pamela Stephenson.
- Jack McBrayer auditioned in 2001.
- Danny McBride was approached by Lorne Michaels to join the show in 2007.
- Bruce McCulloch auditioned in 1985.
- Kevin McDonald auditioned in 1985. He was offered a part in 1995 but he turned it down.
- Adam McKay auditioned in 1995. He was then head writer from 1995 until 2001.
- Lorne Michaels himself volunteered to be the original anchor for Weekend Update, inspired by a similar segment on his original sketch show The Hart and Lorne Terrific Hour. However, he changed his mind because he wanted to give the actual writers a chance at having their material produced.
- Cristin Milioti sent an audition tape in after her guest spot on 30 Rock in 2011.
- T.J. Miller auditioned in 2008.
- Kel Mitchell auditioned in 2003 alongside former All That and Kenan & Kel co-star Kenan Thompson, who was hired.
- Lamorne Morris auditioned in 2010, but lost out to Jay Pharoah.
- John Mulaney auditioned in 2008. Instead, he was hired as a writer for the show, a role he held from the 34th to 37th season. Mulaney later went on to host during seasons 43, 44, 45, 46, 47, and 50.
- Arden Myrin auditioned in 2005. Myrin later became a Mad TV cast member in 2005.

== N ==
- Kathy Najimy auditioned for the show in 1984, but lost to Pamela Stephenson.
- Kumail Nanjiani auditioned in 2012. He went on to host in 2017.

== P ==
- Paula Jai Parker auditioned in 1995.
- Jordan Peele auditioned to play the role of Barack Obama in 2008 but lost the role to Fred Armisen.
- Aubrey Plaza auditioned in 2008. Plaza also worked as an intern of the show three years prior. She later hosted during the 48th season.

== R ==
- Paul Reubens auditioned in 1980 only to lose the part to Gilbert Gottfried. Reubens claimed Gottfried was favored over him because he was friends with one of the producers of the show. Reubens later hosted in 1985, in-character as Pee-wee Herman.
- John Roberts auditioned in 2008.
- Matt Rogers auditioned in the spring of 2018, around the same time as Bowen Yang with whom he's hosted Las Culturistas since 2016.
- Jeff Ross auditioned in 2000 for a part in the Weekend Update after Colin Quinn left the show.
- Mercedes Ruehl auditioned in 1980, but was passed over in favor of Denny Dillon.
- Amber Ruffin auditioned in 2013 when the show was looking to add an African-American woman to the cast but lost to Sasheer Zamata.

== S ==
- Andrew Santino auditioned for the show in 2014.
- Akiva Schaffer auditioned in 2005. Schaffer was a writer from the 31st to 36th season.
- Paul Scheer auditioned for the show twice in 2001 and 2002.
- Amy Sedaris auditioned in 1995 in an attempt to replace cast member Janeane Garofalo.
- J. B. Smoove auditioned in 2003 but lost out to both Kenan Thompson and Finesse Mitchell. Smoove was hired as a writer from the 29th to 31st season.
- Megan Stalter auditioned at some point, but never gave any specific details about her audition process.

== T ==
- Jorma Taccone auditioned in 2005. Taccone became a writer from the 31st to 35th season.
- Scott Thompson auditioned in 1985.
- Robert Townsend auditioned in 1980 only to lose the part to Eddie Murphy.

== W ==
- Keenen Ivory Wayans auditioned for the show. He credited Saturday Night Live as an inspiration for creating the sketch show In Living Color. His brother Damon Wayans was a cast member in the 11th season, but was fired for breaking Lorne Michaels' "no improv" rule.
- Bresha Webb auditioned in 2013 when the show was looking to add an African-American woman to the cast but lost to Sasheer Zamata.
- Stephnie Weir auditioned in 1999 but lost to Rachel Dratch. Weir later became a cast member on Mad TV in 2000.
- Wolves of Glendale took part in a talent showcase to audition for the show's 52nd season.

== Z ==
- Henry Zebrowski auditioned in 2010.
