= North Lambton Secondary School =

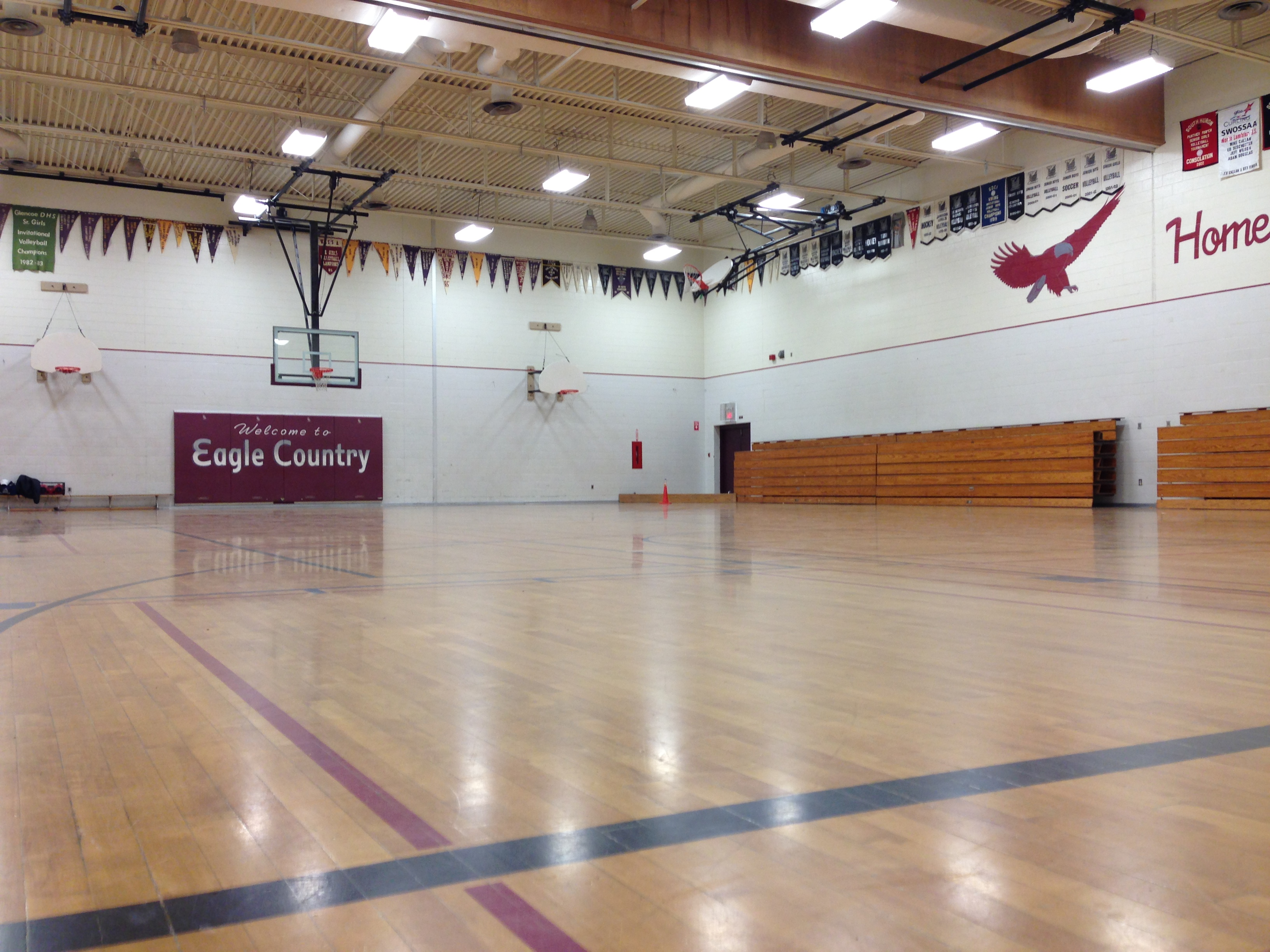

Location
- 15-19 George Street; Forest, Ontario, N0N 1J0; Canada; 43.0934°N 82.00233°W

Information
- School type: High school
- Founded: September 1st 1890
- School board: Lambton Kent District School Board
- Superintendent: Gary Girardi
- Area trustee: Jane Bryce
- School number: 910228
- Principal: Mr. Robert Beaudoin
- Grades: 9-12
- Language: English Ojibway
- Area: Lambton
- Colours: Maroon and Grey
- Mascot: Hampton The Eagle
- Team name: North Lambton Eagles
- Website: nlss.lkdsb.net

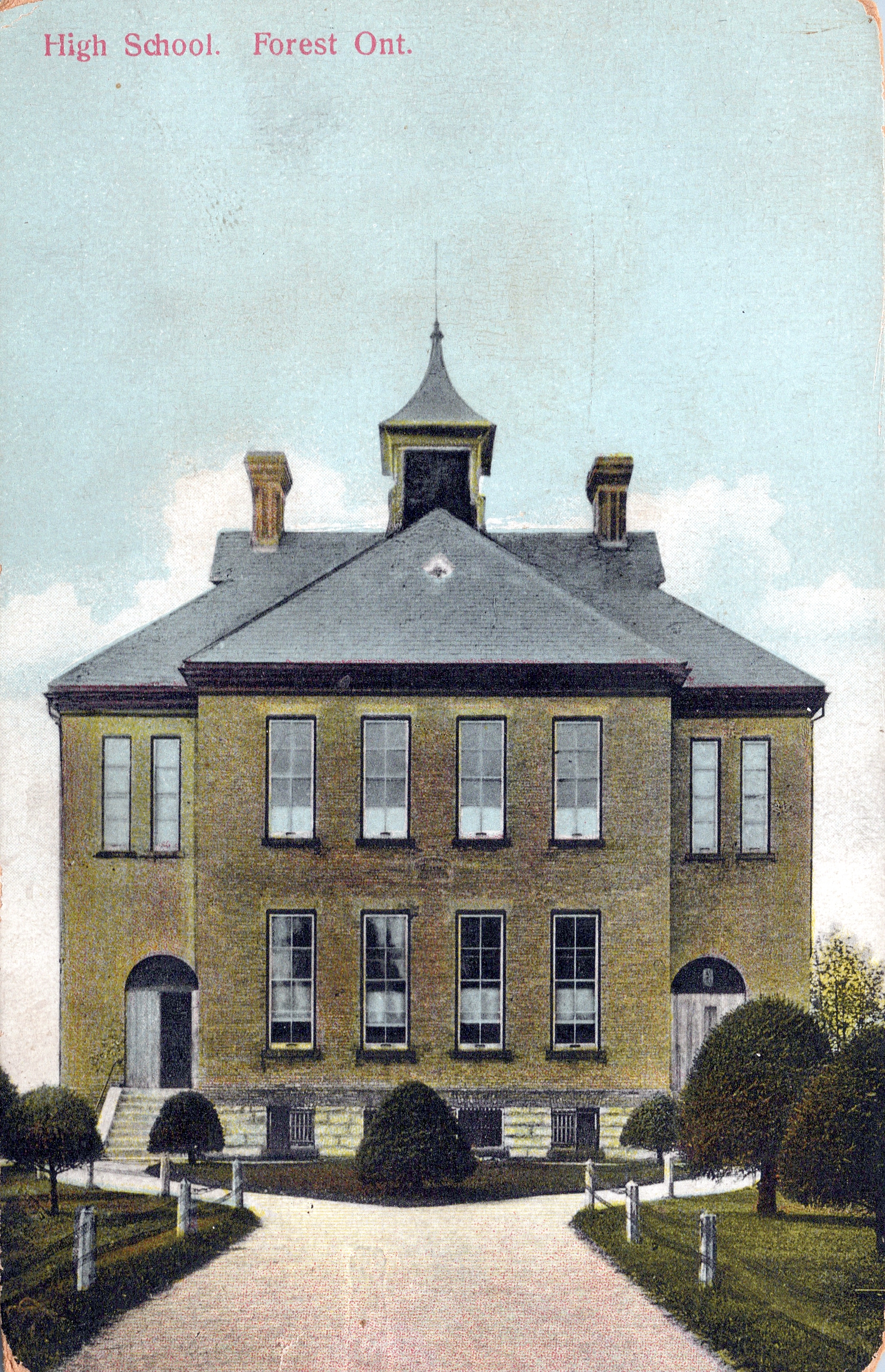
Forest High School

North Lambton Secondary School is a Canadian public school in Forest, Ontario. It is operated by the Lambton Kent District School Board. It was originally named Forest High School and subsequently Forest District High School. Around 480 students are currently attending NLSS. Its feeder elementary schools are Plympton-Wyoming (Aberarder Central School), Watford (East Lambton and St. Peter Canisius), Grand Bend (Grand Bend Public) and Forest (St. John Fisher and Kinnwood Central) as well as Hillside School on the Kettle and Stony Point First Nation and Bosanquet Central outside Thedford.

== History ==
Until the 1880s, students seeking to go beyond a basic elementary school education would have to board in larger centers such as Sarnia, where a district grammar school had been established in 1844. The abolition of the district grammar schools in 1871 led to the creation of collegiate institutes and high schools, the former devoted to traditional forms of education and the latter catering to male and female students in subject areas like English and the natural sciences. Students living in larger cities who planned to further their education at university were more likely to attend collegiate institutes. However, in communities such as Forest the development of high schools provided a base for those wishing to continue their studies at normal school or university.

In 1890, Forest's first permanent high school was built for $6,300 with Principal James H. Philip and four additional teachers serving approximately 160 students. Prior to this Forest had been served by a Model School. The school was gradually enlarged but suffered a catastrophic fire in 1940 at which point it was substantially rebuilt. Over the subsequent decades, enrolments increased due to the demographic increase of the "Baby Boom" and an increasing demand for higher education. The last major addition to the school was completed in the early 1970s.

With the creation of the Lambton County Board of Education in 1969, Forest District High School was renamed North Lambton Secondary School. Plans for the expansion of the school were tentatively approved in the spring of 1969 which would see $1 million spent on increasing student capacity from 750 to 1,200. Subsequent estimates indicated that $579,520 was required to make these alterations.

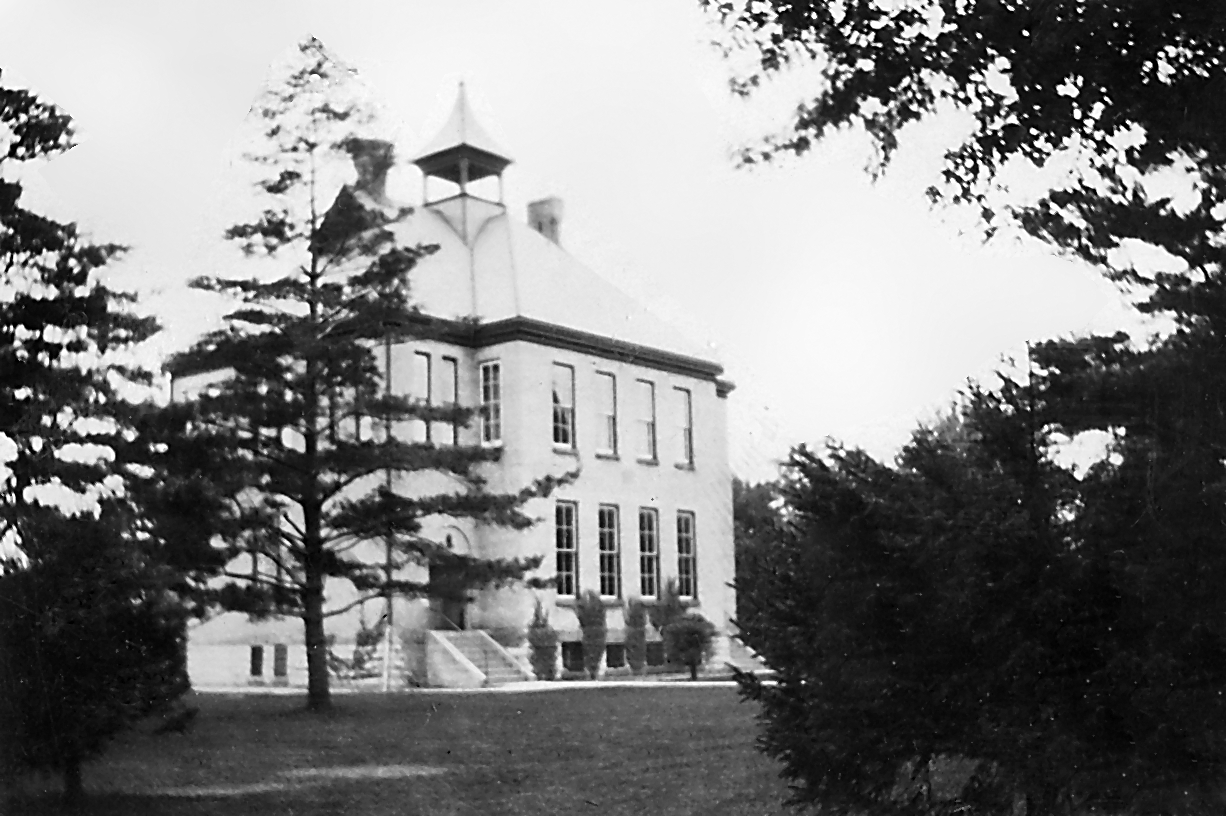
This photo shows the original Forest High School. After the fire of 1940, some of the original structure was incorporated into the rebuild.

In 2015 the school celebrated its 125th anniversary.

== Fine arts ==
North Lambton has a variety of courses including drama, vocals, visual art, concert band and jazz band. The drama department puts on two major productions each year. The shows usually include a murder-mystery in the fall put on by the senior drama class, and a spring musical featuring students from the school-wide drama club.

Twice a year the music department hosts Music Night to showcase the work of the Grade 9 Band, the Senior Band, and the Jazz Band, as well as the Vocals class and club.

In the fall, the drama department hosts the Coffee House Concert where all students, North Lambton Alumni, and community members are invited to come perform musically or recite poems.

== Athletic programs ==
=== Varsity athletics ===
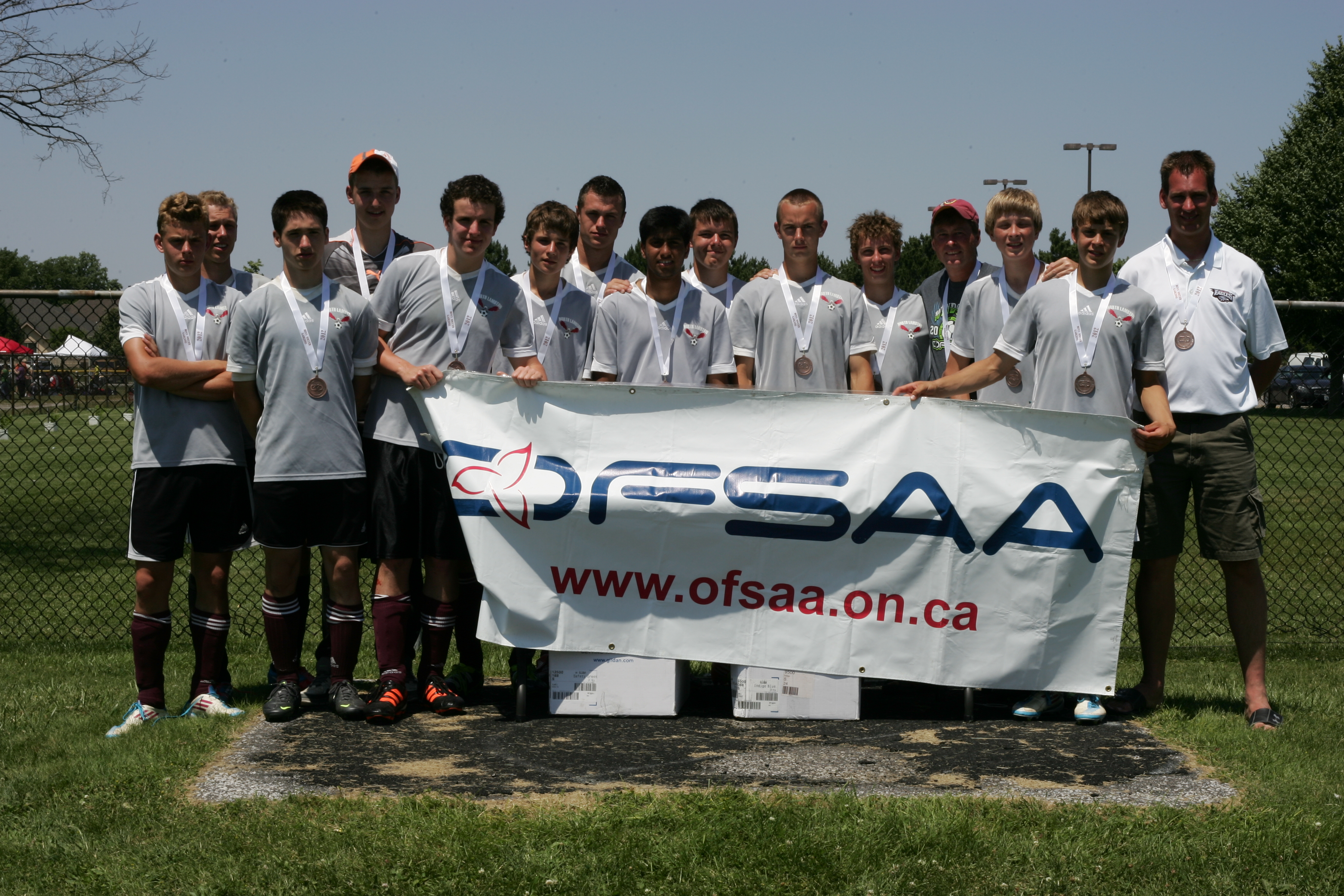
OFSAA Boys A Soccer Windsor 2012: Going into the tournament unranked, North Lambton upset the number one seed and ended with a fourth-place finish.

- Cross country
- Track and field
- Soccer - Lost in LKSSAA Finals
- Basketball
- Volleyball
- Golf - Advanced to SWOSSAA
- Badminton
- Curling - OFSAA 2018/19
- Tennis
- Hockey

=== Junior varsity athletics ===
- Volleyball
- Cross country
- Basketball - Girls lost in SWOSSAA Finals
- Golf
- Track and field

== Notable alumni ==
- Sydney Topliffe - Actress Davey & Jonesie's Locker (2024), Wayward (2025).

== See also ==
- Education in Ontario
- List of secondary schools in Ontario
