= Forest, Ontario =

Community in Ontario, Canada

Coordinates: 43°06′N 82°00′W

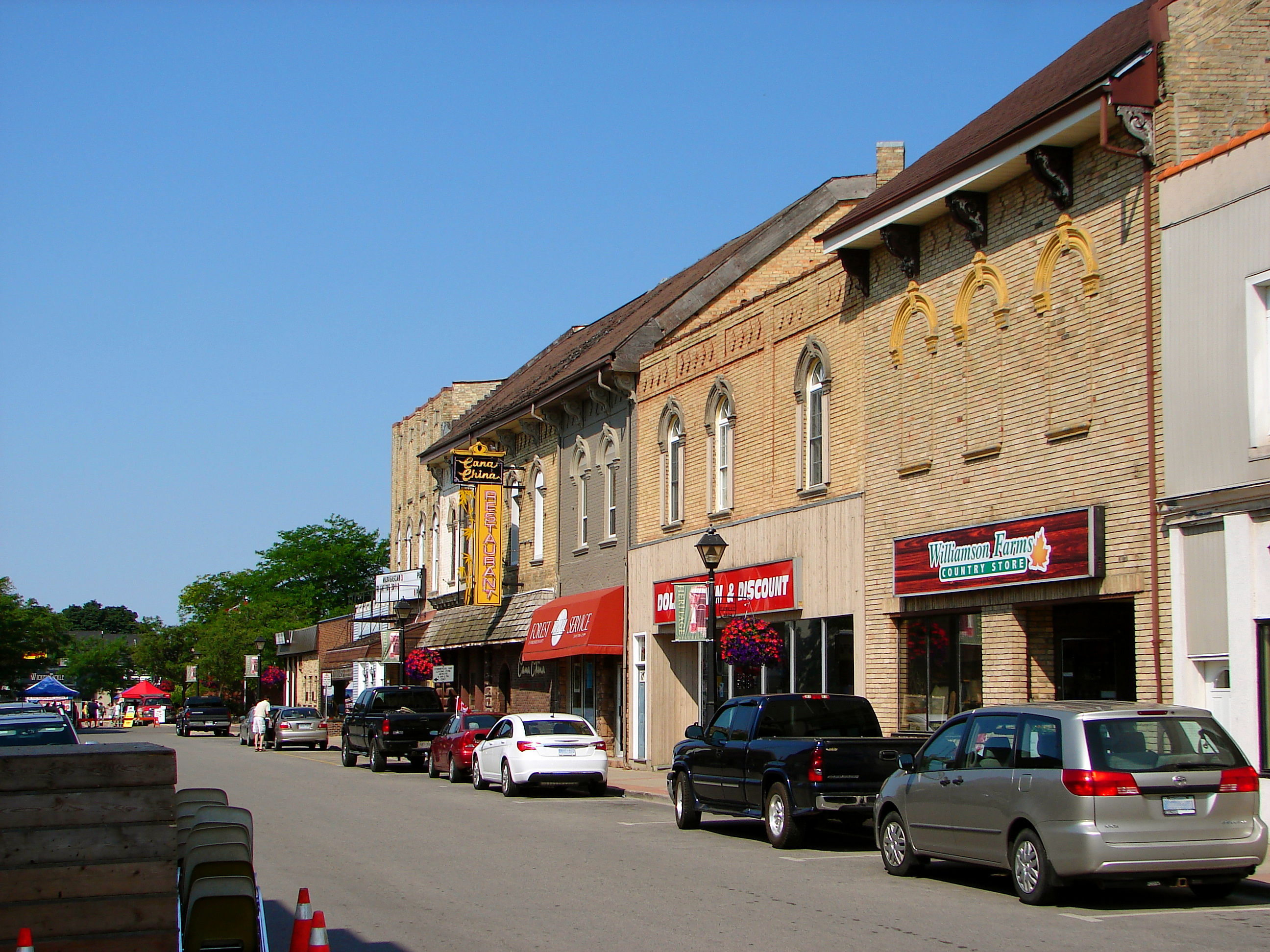
King St. looking west in Forest's downtown.

Forest is a community in Lambton Shores, Ontario, Canada, near Sarnia and Lake Huron in Lambton County. It has a population of 2,876 (2011 Census) and a land area of 5.26 square kilometres (2.03 sq mi).

== Community ==
Forest's high school is North Lambton Secondary School. This facility includes a large gymnasium and cafeteria, as well as meal preparation facilities. The community also has elementary schools in both the public (Kinnwood Central Public School) and catholic (St. John Fisher) school systems.

Recreational facilities include an enclosed arena for hockey or ringette, a community centre for dances held by the town with baseball and soccer fields, a lawn bowling club, public tennis courts, splash pad and an agricultural society with grounds used for a fall fair and occasional campsites. There are a dozen golf courses within a 20-mile drive.

Forest Amphitheatre is a natural amphitheatre located at the conservation area (Esli Dodge Conservation Area) in the south part of the town. The stage is situated on a small island, and spectators sit on the surrounding hillsides on lawn chairs or blankets. Hundreds attend outdoor performances there each summer. An annual performance of a religious play (The Promise), acted in by members of the town, was held annually from 1995 to 2005. Since 2007 country music concerts entitled "Music In the Valley" have been held there.

The Forest Museum is located in the old Forest Home Bakery building at 8 Main St. N. This building dates to the 1880s. Permanent display themes include the bakery, First Nations, agriculture, the railway, the military, the Forest Excelsior Band, local doctors, fashion, toys, Peoples Telephone, area businesses, churches and schools. The museum was founded in 1963 by the Forest-Lambton Museum Society. In 2019, museum volunteers discovered 100 year old silent movie era posters hidden away in an old storage shed on the property. The posters were likely kept in the shed because the bakery was once owned by the Rumford family, founders of the Kineto Theatre. Two of the recovered posters has been cleaned up and are on display at the museum. A third is on display at the Kineto.

The Kineto Theatre is one of the world's oldest movie theatres, having been in operation since 1917. Owned and operated by the Kiwanis Club of Forest, it features a concession booth and seats up to 225 people, and is open every Friday, Saturday, Sunday and Tuesday.

== History ==
Forest is situated on what was once dense forest. When the Grand Trunk Railway was built through where the town now sits, the station was named for the dense forest. Hickory Creek, which meanders through the town, provided water for the station in those days when wood and water were essential to the operation of steam locomotives.

The first post office, in 1859, was then named Forest. The site was very near the junction of three township boundaries, with parts of Warwick, Plympton and Bosanquet townships all annexed into the town. None of these townships remain as political units due to amalgamation, with Bosanquet joining Forest in forming Lambton Shores (along with the villages of Arkona, Thedford, and Grand Bend).

The industry of the town was initially tied to the abundant fruit growing operation. There were once a canning factory and a basket factory in Forest. In more recent years the town has become a dormitory community for the city of Sarnia (and to a lesser extent London, Ontario). The extensive tourism area along the shores of nearby Lake Huron also supports several businesses. Several small factories supporting the auto industry have also opened in the past few years.

The former Forest Carnegie library has its historical plaque posted on the outside pillar and is now operating as an event centre.

== Notable people ==
- Brothers Dan and Thom Speck of the a cappella group The Essentials grew up in Forest and attended North Lambton Secondary School.
- Emily Murphy (1868–1933), one of the "Famous Five" who fought the "Persons Case" in the 1920s, once lived in Forest where her husband was an Anglican minister.
- Ice hockey player John McIntyre grew up on a farm near Forest and attended North Lambton Secondary School. He played for the Toronto Maple Leafs, Los Angeles Kings, New York Rangers, and Vancouver Canucks from 1990 to 1995.
- Singer-songwriter Emm Gryner grew up near Forest and attended North Lambton Secondary School.
- Dublin (Ireland) -based author Roslyn Fuller grew up near Forest and attended North Lambton Secondary School before moving to Europe at the age of 19.
- Robyn Doolittle, journalist with the Toronto Star, grew up in Forest and attended North Lambton Secondary School. Her news stories concerning Mayor Rob Ford, including one where she described watching a video of the mayor apparently using a crack pipe, brought her international attention, particularly after the mayor's ultimate admission that he had smoked crack in a drunken stupor.
- Tyler McGregor, sledge hockey player and 2014 Paralympic medalist, grew up in Forest and attended North Lambton Secondary School. Tyler is the captain of Canada’s national para hockey team.
- Andrew Bruce Boa (1930–2004), an actor whose credits include The Empire Strikes Back and the British sitcom Fawlty Towers, lived in Forest during his high school years. His father, Rev. Andrew D. Boa, was the minister of Forest United Church from 1941 to 1950.
- Marion (Boa) Woodman (1928–2018) was a Canadian mythopoetic author, poet, analytical psychologist and women's movement figure. She wrote and spoke extensively about the dream theories of Carl Jung. Marion lived in Forest during her high school years. Her father, Rev. Andrew D. Boa, was the minister of Forest United Church from 1941 to 1950.
- Ice hockey player Bill Lochead was raised in Forest. He played for the Detroit Red Wings, Colorado Rockies and the New York Rangers between 1974 and 1980.
- Rosalind Morris (1920–2022) was a distinguished and trailblazing cytogeneticist and educator. Born in Wales, her family immigrated to Canada in the 1920s, settling on the 12th of Plympton (Douglas Line), just outside Forest, where they had a fruit farm. After graduating from Forest High School in 1938 with the highest marks in Lambton County, she attended Ontario Agricultural College in Guelph from where she obtained her BSA in 1942. In 1947 she became one of the first two women to graduate with a doctorate degree from Cornell University's Department of Plant Breeding. In 1963 Dr. Morris became the first woman honored as a fellow of the American Society of Agronomy. According to her obituary, she "was a trailblazer for women in agronomy when it was unusual to see women in such roles. In 1978 she was the first woman to receive the honorary title of Fellow from the American Society of Agronomy." Dr. Morris died in Lincoln, Nebraska in 2022 at the age of 101.

• Up and Coming Film Maker, writer and actor Zain Ruffo was born and raised in Forest. He starred in and wrote Cold Blade the Movie and it's sequel

== See also ==
- List of unincorporated communities in Ontario
