= Wolves of Glendale =

American comedy music band

- Origin: Los Angeles, California, U.S.
- Genres: Comedy; rock
- Years active: 2022–present
- Spinoff of: The Cooties
- Members: Ethan Edenburg; Eric Jackowitz; Tom McGovern
- Website: wolvesofglendale.com

Wolves of Glendale is an American comedy rock band formed in 2022 in Los Angeles, California. The band consists of guitarist Ethan Edenburg, drummer Eric Jackowitz, and guitarist/keyboardist Tom McGovern. All three members sing, with many of their songs featuring vocal harmony and shared lead vocals.

The band released their eponymous debut album in January 2024; their second album, Go to the Woods!, is was released in August 2026.

== History ==
Wolves of Glendale formed in March 2022. Edenburg and Jackowitz were originally in the comedy band The Cooties for five years prior, beginning in 2016. They met McGovern when he moved to Los Angeles from New York City, which eventually lead to the trio deciding to work on new comedy songs together. The first song they wrote was "Vapin' in Vegas," although their first single released was "Olivia."

The band was noticed by Tenacious D and was invited to open for them at a New Years event in 2022. They have additionally opened for David Cross and Jukebox the Ghost, performed at Netflix Is a Joke Festival in 2022 and 2026, and performed at Lollapalooza and Bonnaroo in 2024.

Wolves of Glendale released its eponymous debut album on January 26, 2024, which was produced by John Spiker and Ryan Lewis. The band toured throughout 2024 to promote the album.

Between April 15 and 19 of 2026, Wolves of Glendale joined OCT (On Company Time) and Kyle Gordon on the "Comedy Music Roadshow." In June 2026, the band officially announced their second studio album Go to the Woods!. It released on August 28, 2026. On August 19, it was announced that the band had taken part in a talent showcase to audition for Saturday Night Live for its 52nd season. They unfortunately were not hired.

== Artistry ==
The band's first album includes largely inspired by the music of 80s and 90s, while the second album leans more into rock influences of the 90s and early 2000s. Their lyrics are often satirical parodies of everyday life, with McGovern stating that the band "[tries] to write the best songs we can about the dumbest things we can." Wolves of Glendale additionally improvises with the creation of new songs during live performances, often inspired by audience input.

The band has cited rock bands like Foo Fighters and Queens of the Stone Age as inspirations, as well as bands such as Hall & Oates and The Alan Parsons Project.

== Members ==
- Ethan Edenburg – guitar, vocals
- Eric Jackowitz – drums, vocals
- Tom McGovern – guitar, keyboards, vocals

== Discography ==
=== Albums ===
- Wolves of Glendale (2024)
- Go to the Woods! (2026)

=== Singles ===
- "Olivia" (2022)
- "Vapin' in Vegas" (2023)
- "Loud Ass Car" (2023)
- "The Gym" (2023)
- "I Barf" (2023)
- "Just Give Me Cash" (2023)
- "33" (2023)
- "RICKY" (2024)
- "Donkey on the Edge" (2025)
- "No Flying in the House" (2025)
- "Life Finds a Way" (2025)
- "Still Alive" (2026)
- "Reptile Guy" (2026)
- "My Uncle Got a Hot Tub" (2026)
- "Like Father, Like Son" (2026)

=== Music videos ===
- "Olivia" (2023)
- "Vapin' in Vegas" (2023)
- "Loud Ass Car" (2023)
- "Just Give Me Cash" (2023)
- "RICKY" (2024)
- "Donkey On The Edge" (2025)
- "No Flying in the House" (2025)
- "Life Finds a Way" (2025)
- "Still Alive" (2026)
- "Reptile Guy" (2026)
- "My Uncle Got a Hot Tub" (2026)
- "Like Father, Like Son" (2026)
