= Randolph College for the Performing Arts =

Private college in Toronto, Canada

Coordinates: 43.6636°N 79.4109°W

- The building in 2011
- Interactive map of Randolph College for the Performing Arts
- Address: 736 Bathurst Street; Toronto, Ontario; Canada
- Type: Private College/Theatre School
- Current use: Theatre School/Theatre

Construction
- Opened: September 8, 1992
- Closed: August 26, 2026
- Years active: 1992–2026
- Architect: Gordon & Helliwell

Website
- randolphcollege.ca

The Randolph College for the Performing Arts (formerly Randolph Academy for the Performing Arts) was a private career college specializing in singing, dancing and acting. It was founded on September 8, 1992, by George C. Randolph Jr., and closed August 26, 2026.

It was located in Toronto, Ontario, on the southwest corner of Lennox Street and Bathurst streets, just south of the former Honest Ed's. The building that was formerly the Bathurst Street Theatre housed the school.

== History ==
The school is located in the former Bathurst Street United Church, which was constructed in 1888.

The school was founded in 1992 by its former president, George C. Randolph Jr. Randolph was a former principal dancer with the Alvin Ailey Repertory Ensemble and with Les Ballets Jazz de Montreal.

Previous artistic directors include: Ron Singer (1993–2009), Darlene Spencer (2009–2016) Tamara Bernier Evans (2016–2019) and Michael Reinhart.

It offers post-secondary professional training in their branded "Triple Threat" skills of dancing, singing, and acting for the stage and screen. All coursework takes place in English. Students are auditioned from across Canada, and internationally. In addition, Randolph Kids Performing Arts program offers classes in singing, dance and acting to students aged 3–17.

== Notable alumni ==
- Carlos Bustamante
- Lisa Berry
- Krystal Garib
- Morgan Kohan
- Adam Korson
- Paul Alexander Nolan
- Jess Salgueiro
- Veronika Slowikowska
- Sydney Topliffe
- Sergio Trujillo

== See also ==
- List of colleges in Ontario
- Higher education in Ontario
