= Saturday Night Live season 51 =

NBC show season

Saturday Night Live
- Season 51
- No. of episodes: 20

Release
- Original network: NBC; Peacock
- Original release: October 4, 2025 – May 16, 2026

Season chronology
- ← Previous season 50 Next → season 52

The fifty-first season of the American sketch comedy late night television program Saturday Night Live premiered on October 4, 2025 on NBC and Peacock during the 2025–26 television season, with host Bad Bunny and musical guest Doja Cat, and concluded on May 16, 2026, with host Will Ferrell and musical guest Paul McCartney. In the season, the series reached a milestone: airing its 1,000th episode, on January 31, 2026, with host Alexander Skarsgård and musical guest Cardi B.

== Cast ==
On August 22, 2025, prior to the start of the season, creator/executive producer Lorne Michaels confirmed that changes to the cast were guaranteed and that announcements about any changes would be made in the following weeks.

Beginning on August 25, a series of departures was announced, starting with Devon Walker (who had been let go from the show after three seasons - since 2022), that was followed later by featured player Emil Wakim (who was let go after one season), Michael Longfellow (also let go after three seasons - since 2022), Heidi Gardner (who had been let go after eight seasons - since 2017), and Ego Nwodim (who voluntarily left after seven seasons - since 2018).

On September 2, 2025, five new featured cast members were announced: stand-up comic Tommy Brennan, Upright Citizens Brigade performer and Dropout TV regular Jeremy Culhane, stand-up comic and Kill Tony podcast regular Kam Patterson, social media comedian and actress Veronika Slowikowska, and Ben Marshall, SNL staff writer and member of the comedy trio and former SNL collaborators, Please Don't Destroy. PDD's time on SNL ended after four seasons (2021–2025) as John Higgins departed the show while Martin Herlihy remained in a writing-only capacity.

Michaels also confirmed that James Austin Johnson would return, noting that the show would rely on Johnson's Donald Trump impersonation for the foreseeable future.

Ashley Padilla and Jane Wickline, both of whom were hired for season 50, remained as featured players.

This was the final season for longtime cast member Bowen Yang (who started on the writing staff in 2018 and had been a cast member since 2019), as he left the show following the Christmas episode hosted by his Wicked co-star, Ariana Grande, on December 20, 2025. He is the sixth cast member to leave the show in 2025, following the former cast members listed above. On July 16, 2026, it was announced that this would also be the final season for longtime cast member Chloe Fineman, who had joined the show the same season as Bowen Yang in 2019.

**Repertory players**

- **Michael Che**
- Mikey Day
- Andrew Dismukes
- Chloe Fineman
- Marcello Hernández
- James Austin Johnson
- **Colin Jost**
- Sarah Sherman
- Kenan Thompson
- Bowen Yang (final episode: December 20, 2025)

**Featured players**

- Tommy Brennan
- Jeremy Culhane
- Ben Marshall
- Ashley Padilla
- Kam Patterson
- Veronika Slowikowska
- Jane Wickline

bold denotes "Weekend Update" anchor

== Writers ==
On August 24, 2025, writer Celeste Yim announced, via Instagram, that they had left the show after five seasons. Yim joined the writing staff in 2020 and became the show's first openly trans, non-binary writer (though Molly Kearney would later become SNL's first and, so far, only non-binary cast member). They also became a writing supervisor in the second half of season 48. The next day, Rosebud Baker, a writer since 2022 who was appointed as a Weekend Update writer the previous season, announced she also had left the show after nearly three seasons. On September 2, 2025, it was announced that Please Don't Destroy member John Higgins, who had been a writer on SNL since 2021, would be leaving after four seasons. On September 4, 2025, long-term writer Steven Castillo announced his departure. Castillo previously wrote for the show from 2017 to 2021, before returning midway through season 49 in 2024, and overall wrote for seven non-consecutive seasons. He stated that his second run at SNL was never meant to be long-term and that he just wanted to be a part of the 50th season.

On September 30, 2025, prior to the start of the season, seven new writers—Jack Bensinger, Tucker Flodman, Maxwell Gay, Claire McFadden, Rachel Pegram, Jo Sunday, and Maddie Wiener—were all hired. At the same time, Auguste White, a writer who joined in 2022, had left the show after three seasons.

Additionally, long time senior writer Bryan Tucker is on a temporary leave from the show, longtime writer/producer Erik Kenward (who has been with the show since 2001) has been promoted to head writer (alongside Kent Sublette, Alison Gates, and Streeter Seidell), and longtime producer Erin Doyle (who has been with the show since 2009) has been promoted to top-level producer alongside Kenward and Steve Higgins.

This was the final season for writer Martin Herlihy, who joined the show in 2021 with John Higgins and Ben Marshall as part of the short-lived short film series, "Please Don't Destroy". Herlihy announced his departure on September 9th, 2026.

== Episodes ==
No. overall	No. in season	Host	Musical guest	Original release date	U.S. viewers (millions)
989	1	Bad Bunny	Doja Cat	October 4, 2025	4.41
Doja Cat performs "Aaahh Men!" and "Gorgeous".; Jon Hamm appears in the opening monologue and the El Chavo del Ocho (English version) sketch.; Ejae, Audrey Nuna, and Rei Ami appear in the KPop Demon Hunters sketch, reprising their roles as Huntrix.; Benicio del Toro appears in the "Inventing Spanish" sketch.; Tommy Brennan, Jeremy Culhane, Ben Marshall, Kam Patterson, and Veronika Slowikowska's first episode as cast members.; Jane Wickline is credited in the opening montage but did not appear in this episode, although she appears on stage during the goodnights.
990	2	Amy Poehler	Role Model	October 11, 2025	4.07
Role Model performs "Sally, When the Wine Runs Out" and "Some Protector".; Tina Fey appears as Kristi Noem in the cold open and appears on Weekend Update.; Aubrey Plaza appears in the pre-recorded "The Hunting Wives season two trailer" sketch.; Charli XCX appears during Role Model's first performance as the "Sally".; Seth Meyers appears on Weekend Update.; When introducing the musical guest, Poehler wears t-shirts with the original SNL logo and a photo of the original Not Ready for Prime Time Players. Also, the final bumper card recreates a shot from the season one opening titles, including the original title NBC's Saturday Night, with this episode airing 50 years to the day of the series premiere in 1975.; Before the goodnights, a photo of Diane Keaton, who died earlier in the day, is shown in silence.
991	3	Sabrina Carpenter	Sabrina Carpenter	October 18, 2025	4.24
Sabrina Carpenter performs "Manchild" and "Nobody's Son".; Kenan Thompson introduces Carpenter's first performance, with Chloe Fineman introducing the second.; During "Nobody's Son", Carpenter swore twice, which aired uncensored on the East Coast live broadcast. It was censored in the form of audio dropouts for the West Coast broadcast, post-broadcast distribution online, as well as in airings internationally.; Writers Martin Herlihy and Jo Sunday appear in the pre-recorded "Social Experiment" sketch.; Bowen Yang was absent from live sketches this episode due to accepting the Academy Museum's Vantage Award in Los Angeles; Yang helped write the episode, was credited in the opening montage, and appears in the pre-recorded "Grind Song" sketch and in a photograph during the opening monologue.; Due to the USC v. Notre Dame football game running overtime, this episode's start was delayed by 13 minutes.
992	4	Miles Teller	Brandi Carlile	November 1, 2025	3.36
Brandi Carlile performs "Church & State" and "Human".; Ramy Youssef and Shane Gillis appear as Zohran Mamdani and Curtis Sliwa, respectively, in the NYC Mayoral Debate cold open.
993	5	Nikki Glaser	Sombr	November 8, 2025	4.02
Sombr performs "12 to 12" and "Back to Friends".; Pete Davidson appears on Weekend Update.
994	6	Glen Powell	Olivia Dean	November 15, 2025	4.17
Olivia Dean performs "Man I Need" and "Let Alone the One You Love".; Will Forte appears in the pre-recorded MacGruber sketches and in the goodnights.
995	7	Melissa McCarthy	Dijon	December 6, 2025	4.30
Dijon performs "Higher!" and "Another Baby!".; Justin Vernon, Nick Hakim, and Amber Coffman are part of Dijon's band for both performances.; Before the goodnights, a photo of Craig Kellem, a producer from the first season, who died on November 24, is shown in silence.
996	8	Josh O'Connor	Lily Allen	December 13, 2025	3.95
Lily Allen performs "Sleepwalking" and "Madeline" and appears in the "Lily Allen Brunch" sketch.; Dakota Johnson appears during Allen's second performance.
997	9	Ariana Grande	Cher	December 20, 2025	5.40
Cher performs "DJ Play a Christmas Song" and "Run Rudolph Run" with Captain Kirk Douglas and the Saturday Night Live Band and appears in the "Delta Lounge" sketch.; Grande appears in-character as "Antonio", a role she played in a season 50 sketch, in introducing Cher's second performance, "Run Rudolph Run".; Aidy Bryant appears alongside Bowen Yang as the Trend Forecasters on Weekend Update, characters the two performed during Bryant's own final episode as an SNL cast member in 2022.; Bowen Yang's final episode as a cast member. To mark his departure, Grande and Cher join him in singing "Please Come Home for Christmas" during his farewell sketch, "Delta Lounge".; Before the goodnights, a photo of Rob Reiner, who hosted the third episode of SNL and who along with his wife was murdered earlier in the week, is shown in silence.
998	10	Finn Wolfhard	A$AP Rocky	January 17, 2026	4.14
A$AP Rocky performs "Punk Rocky" and a medley of "Don't Be Dumb/Trip Baby" and "Helicopter" and appears in the "Snack Homiez" sketch.; Danny Elfman and Thundercat play drums and bass, respectively, during Rocky's first performance and appear in the background during his second.; Beginning with this episode, Jeremy Culhane takes over playing JD Vance from Bowen Yang and Ashley Padilla takes over playing Kristi Noem from Tina Fey.; Caleb McLaughlin and Gaten Matarazzo, Wolfhard's Stranger Things co-stars, appear in the opening monologue and in the pre-recorded "Stranger Things Promo" sketch.; Sabrina Carpenter appears in the "Snack Homiez" sketch.; Jason Momoa appears in the pre-recorded "Heated Wizardry" sketch.; Before the goodnights, a still photo of Bob Weir, who died on January 10, is shown in silence.
999	11	Teyana Taylor	Geese	January 24, 2026	4.44
Geese performs "Au Pays du Cocaine" and "Trinidad".; Mike Myers appears as Elon Musk in the cold open.; Taylor's daughters Rue Rose and Iman "Junie" Tayla appear in the audience during the monologue.; Writer Martin Herlihy appears in the pre-recorded "Blowing It" sketch.
1000	12	Alexander Skarsgård	Cardi B	January 31, 2026	4.82
Cardi B performs "Bodega Baddie" (with El Prodigio) and "ErrTime" and appears in the "Immigrant Dad Talk Show" sketch.; Pete Davidson appears as Tom Homan in the cold open.; Skarsgård's father, Stellan, appears in the "Scandinavian Movie 2" sketch and the "Immigrant Dad Talk Show" sketch.; Jack McBrayer appears on Weekend Update.; Siobhan Fallon Hogan, a former cast member, attended this episode, as did members of the SNL UK cast.; Before the goodnights, a classic SNL bumper containing a photo of Catherine O'Hara, who hosted the show during seasons 16 and 18, and who died the previous day, is shown in silence.; Kam Patterson is credited in the opening montage but did not appear in this episode, although he appears on stage during the goodnights.
1001	13	Connor Storrie	Mumford & Sons	February 28, 2026	4.61
Mumford & Sons perform "Rubber Band Man" with Hozier and "Here" with Sierra Ferrell and appear in the "Office Dance" sketch.; Aaron Dessner accompanies them for both performances.; Quinn Hughes, Jack Hughes, Hilary Knight and Megan Keller appear in the opening monologue.; Hudson Williams appears in the "Ice Skating" sketch and helps introduce Mumford & Sons' first performance.; In versions distributed online, the "Mr. Fronzi" sketch is replaced by the dress rehearsal version, owing to a mistake made by Storrie in the live broadcast.; A cut-for-time sketch later released on social media, which touched on the controversy surrounding the broadcast of racial slurs at that year's British Academy Film Awards ceremony, was subject to widespread criticism, due to being perceived to mock and deride individuals with Tourette's.; Chloe Fineman does not appear in this episode, but is credited in the opening montage.
1002	14	Ryan Gosling	Gorillaz	March 7, 2026	4.34
Gorillaz perform "Clint Eastwood" with Del the Funky Homosapien and "The Moon Cave" with Anoushka Shankar, Asha Puthli, and Black Thought.; Harry Styles appears in the opening monologue.; Writer Martin Herlihy and Seth Meyers appear in the pre-recorded "Lies" sketch.; Before the goodnights, a photo of Sandy Wernick, who died earlier in the week, is shown in silence.
1003	15	Harry Styles	Harry Styles	March 14, 2026	4.79
Harry Styles performs "Dance No More" and "Coming Up Roses".; Ryan Gosling introduces Styles' first performance, with Paul Simon introducing the second.; Kenan Thompson reprises his Jean K. Jean character for the first time since 2013 during the "Sparkle on the Sea" sketch.
1004	16	Jack Black	Jack White	April 4, 2026	4.50
Jack White performs "Derecho Demonico" and "G.O.D. and the Broken Ribs". He also appears in the opening monologue, where he performed a rendition of "Seven Nation Army" with Black, and in the pre-recorded "Words to Live By" sketch.; Jonah Hill, Tina Fey, Candice Bergen and Melissa McCarthy appear in the opening monologue to induct Black into the Five-Timers Club. Hill originally appeared in the Sarah Sherman commentary about Kristi Noem during Weekend Update but it was cut after dress rehearsal.; McCarthy also appears in the "AirBnB Superhost" sketch.
1005	17	Colman Domingo	Anitta	April 11, 2026	4.15
Anitta performs "Choka Choka" and "Várias queixas".; The performance of "Choka Choka" was excised from the episode's broadcast in the United Kingdom, but remains intact on streaming platforms.
1006	18	Olivia Rodrigo	Olivia Rodrigo	May 2, 2026	4.99
Olivia Rodrigo performs "Drop Dead" and "Begged".; Debbie Harry introduces Rodrigo's first performance, while Connor Storrie introduces Rodrigo's second performance. Weyes Blood was part of Rodrigo's band for the second performance.; The performance of "Drop Dead" was excised from the episode's broadcast in the United Kingdom, but remains intact on streaming platforms.; Aziz Ansari appears as Kash Patel in the cold open.
1007	19	Matt Damon	Noah Kahan	May 9, 2026	4.68
Noah Kahan performs "The Great Divide" and "Doors".; Aziz Ansari appears as Kash Patel in the cold open.; Marcello Hernandez's mother, Isabel Cancela, and writer Jack Bensinger appear in the opening monologue.
1008	20	Will Ferrell	Paul McCartney	May 16, 2026	5.30
Paul McCartney performs "Days We Left Behind", "Band on the Run" and "Coming Up" and appears in the opening monologue and the "Mechanics" sketch.; Post-broadcast, McCartney also performed "Help!" and "Drive My Car", which were later released on social media.; Aziz Ansari appears as Kash Patel in the cold open.; Chad Smith appears as Ferrell in the opening monologue and plays drums with McCartney's backing band.; Ingrid Michaelson also appears in McCartney's backing band, providing harmonies.; Molly Shannon appears in the "Cast List 2" sketch.; Chloe Fineman's final episode as a cast member.

== Ratings ==
Viewership and ratings per episode of Saturday Night Live season 51
No.	Title	Air date	Rating (18–49)	Viewers (millions)	Ref.
1	"Bad Bunny / Doja Cat"	October 4, 2025	0.83	4.634	
2	"Amy Poehler / Role Model"	October 11, 2025	0.66	4.369	
3	"Sabrina Carpenter"	October 18, 2025	0.69	4.365	
4	"Miles Teller / Brandi Carlile"	November 1, 2025	0.44	3.496	
5	"Nikki Glaser / sombr"	November 8, 2025	0.54	4.023	
6	"Glen Powell / Olivia Dean"	November 15, 2025	0.59	4.165	
7	"Melissa McCarthy / Dijon"	December 6, 2025	0.55	4.304	
8	"Josh O'Connor / Lily Allen"	December 13, 2025	0.52	3.949	
9	"Ariana Grande / Cher"	December 20, 2025	0.90	5.404	
10	"Finn Wolfhard / A$AP Rocky"	January 17, 2026	0.63	4.140	
11	"Teyana Taylor / Geese"	January 24, 2026	0.51	4.437	
12	"Alexander Skarsgård / Cardi B"	January 31, 2026	0.70	4.820	
13	"Connor Storrie / Mumford & Sons"	February 28, 2026	0.76	4.611	
14	"Ryan Gosling / Gorillaz"	March 7, 2026	0.60	4.342	
15	"Harry Styles"	March 14, 2026	0.69	4.792	
16	"Jack Black / Jack White"	April 4, 2026	0.76	4.5	
17	"Colman Domingo / Anitta"	April 11, 2026	0.62	4.148	
18	"Olivia Rodrigo"	May 2, 2026	0.81	4.993	
19	"Matt Damon / Noah Kahan"	May 9, 2026	0.70	4.679	
20	"Will Ferrell / Paul McCartney"	May 16, 2026	0.82	5.303	
