= 72 Hours (2026 film) =

2026 film by Tim Story

- Promotional release poster
- Directed by: Tim Story
- Written by: Jon Hurwitz; Hayden Schlossberg; Kevin Burrows; Matt Mider
- Produced by: John Davis; Jon Hurwitz; Hayden Schlossberg; Josh Heald; Kevin Hart; Luke Kelly-Clyne; Bryan Smiley; Tim Story; Will Packer
- Starring: Kevin Hart; Marcello Hernández; Mason Gooding; Kam Patterson; Ben Marshall; Zach Cherry; Mike Epps; Teyana Taylor
- Cinematography: Larry Blanford
- Edited by: Peter S. Elliot
- Music by: Christopher Lennertz
- Production companies: Sony Pictures; Davis Entertainment Company; Counterbalance Entertainment; Hartbeat Productions; Will Packer Productions; The Story Company
- Distributed by: Netflix
- Release dates: July 20, 2026 (Paris Theater); July 24, 2026 (United States)
- Running time: 105 minutes
- Country: United States
- Language: English

72 Hours is a 2026 American comedy film directed by Tim Story and written by Jon Hurwitz, Hayden Schlossberg, Kevin Burrows, and Matt Mider. It stars Kevin Hart, Marcello Hernández, Mason Gooding, Kam Patterson, Ben Marshall, Zach Cherry, Michael Mando, Mike Epps, and Teyana Taylor.

It held its world premiere at the Paris Theater in Manhattan on July 20, 2026, and was released worldwide on Netflix on July 24. It received mixed reviews.

== Plot ==
The movie begins with Joe talking to his doctor girlfriend on the phone and receiving a message talking about a bachelor party weekend. He hangs up on the call with his girlfriend and reads their message and considers joining their fun time in Miami. At work as an advertising specialist, Joe is disappointed to learn he didn't get the promotion he was hoping for because he's too old. Determined to get his youth back, he takes their invitation to Miami seriously and books a lavish Airbnb property. Breaking the news to his longtime girlfriend on bended knee, she believes he's finally proposing to her. When he tells her marriage is not a priority for him, she becomes upset and leaves, blocking his calls. To the group's surprise, Joe shows up to Miami a much older man than expected. Still excited to reconnect with his youth, he attempts to be one of the guys and does drugs and drinks heavily, leading to ongoing chaos.

== Cast ==
- Kevin Hart as Joe
- Marcello Hernández as Nick
- Mason Gooding as Mason
- Kam Patterson as Freshman
- Ben Marshall as Hunter
- Zach Cherry as Barry
- Michael Mando as Jaze
- Teyana Taylor as Jennifer
- Kevin Dunn as Terry
- Anna Garcia as Trixie
- Elysée Sanvillé as Scarlett
- Geena Quintos as Dallas
- Megan Suri as Caroline
- Andy Garcia as Drug Lord
- Brandon Dial as Daniel
- Amy Keum as Alicia
- Amenah as Emily
- Ava Eisenson as Tracy
- Katt Williams as Mike
- Mike Epps as Officer Williard

== Production ==
Directed by Tim Story and starring Kevin Hart, the film was produced as part of the latter's first-look overall deal with Netflix by Hartbeat Productions, Davis Entertainment, Counterbalance Entertainment and Will Packer. The script was written by Matt Mider and Kevin Burrows, Jon Hurwitz and Hayden Schlossberg, with Hurwitz and Schlossberg having authored the initial draft. In June, Teyana Taylor, Ben Marshall, Zach Cherry, Kam Patterson, Marcello Hernández, and Mason Gooding, joined the cast. In July, Michael Mando joined the cast.

=== Filming ===
Principal photography began on June 24, 2025, in New Jersey, with Larry Blanford serving as the cinematographer.

=== Music ===
72 Hours (Soundtrack from the Netflix Film)

Film score by Christopher Lennertz
- Released: July 24, 2026
- Recorded: 2026
- Studios: AIR Studios, London; Sonic Fuel Studios, Los Angeles
- Genre: Film score
- Length: 50:28
- Label: Netflix
- Producers: Christopher Lennertz; Jose Castillo

Christopher Lennertz chronology
The Boys: Season 5 (2026)	72 Hours (2026)

Christopher Lennertz, a long-time collaborative composer for Tim Story's films, was confirmed to compose the film's score. The score was recorded at AIR Studios in London, and Sonic Fuel Studios in Los Angeles. The album, 72 Hours (Soundtrack from the Netflix Film), was released by Netflix Music on July 24, 2026, on Spotify and other MOD-providers, coinciding with the film's release.

== Release ==
The film held its world premiere at the Paris Theater in Manhattan, New York City on July 20, 2026. The film premiered worldwide on Netflix on July 24.

== Reception ==
On the review aggregation website Rotten Tomatoes, 18% of 39 critics' reviews are positive, with an average rating of 4.1/10. Metacritic, which uses a weighted average, assigned the film a score of 41 out of 100, based on 15 critics, indicating "mixed or average" reviews.

Todd Gilchrist of Variety gave the film a negative review, calling it a "mediocre The Hangover knockoff" and "a generation-gap comedy that just isn't quite enough fun to pass muster," before he concludes with: "But not unlike a hangover itself, 72 Hours is a movie that reminds you of a specter of the past; the problem is that it never delivers enough good times to make the painful aftermath otherwise."

Robert Daniels of RogerEbert.com gave it two and a half out of four stars and wrote, "In some sense, the plot mechanics are merely an excuse to perform toilet bowl gags (there are more dick jokes here than you can count). And yet, there's some unquestionable charm to seeing Hart's well-worn comedic impulses collide with a script whose references appear to be just as dated."
