= Saturday Night Live season 52 =

NBC show season

Saturday Night Live
- Season 52
- No. of episodes: 6

Release
- Original network: NBC; Peacock
- Original release: September 26, 2026 – present

Season chronology
- ← Previous season 51

The fifty-second season of the American sketch comedy late night television program Saturday Night Live premiered on September 26, 2026, on NBC and Peacock during the 2026–27 television season with host Jalen Brunson and musical guest Katseye, and is scheduled to conclude on May 15, 2027.

== Cast ==
Before the start of the season, longtime cast member Chloe Fineman, who had been on the show since 2019, departed after seven seasons.

On September 16, two new cast members were announced: comedian and filmmaker Saidah Belo-Osagie and social media sketch comic and American High cast member Grace Reiter. Born in 2001, Reiter is the first cast member born in the 2000s. Ashley Padilla and Jane Wickline, who joined in season 50, were promoted to repertory status, while Tommy Brennan, Jeremy Culhane, Ben Marshall, Kam Patterson and Veronika Slowikowska, who all joined the previous season, remained featured players.

**Repertory players**

- **Michael Che**
- Mikey Day
- Andrew Dismukes
- Marcello Hernández
- James Austin Johnson
- **Colin Jost**
- Ashley Padilla
- Sarah Sherman
- Kenan Thompson
- Jane Wickline

**Featured players**

- Saidah Belo-Osagie
- Tommy Brennan
- Jeremy Culhane
- Ben Marshall
- Kam Patterson
- Grace Reiter
- Veronika Slowikowska

bold denotes Weekend Update anchor

== Writers ==
On September 9, 2026, it was announced that longtime writer and collaborator Martin Herlihy would be leaving after five seasons on the show, since 2021. Herlihy is the second member of sketch comedy trio Please Don't Destroy to leave the show after John Higgins left prior to season 51.

On September 25, 2026, two new writers were announced to have joined the writing staff: Upright Citizens Brigade performer Bam Alston and Groundlings Main Company alum Chase Rosenberg.

Additionally, writer Jake Nordwind, who joined the show in 2021, was promoted to writing supervisor, joining longtime writers Dan Bulla and Will Stephen.

== Episodes ==
No. overall	No. in season	Host	Musical guest	Original release date	U.S. viewers (millions)
1009	1	Jalen Brunson	Katseye	September 26, 2026	4.61
Katseye performs "Animal" and "Hootie Frutti" and appears in the pre-recorded "Dream Academy Season Two" sketch.; Ramy Youssef appears in the cold open as Mayor Zohran Mamdani.; Brunson's teammates from the New York Knicks, Karl-Anthony Towns, Mikal Bridges, OG Anunoby, and Josh Hart appear in the opening monologue.; Saidah Belo-Osagie and Grace Reiter's first episode as cast members.; This episode was subject to a sixteen minute delay on several NBC affiliates due to an overrunning Oregon–USC football game, but was broadcast live as intended on Peacock and in New York.
1010	2	Dakota Johnson	Turnstile	October 3, 2026	4.40
Turnstile performs "Birds" and a medley of "I Care" and "Dull".; Taylor Swift appears in the opening monologue and also in the goodnights as she gives Johnson a cake to celebrate her birthday.; The "Amazing Tales of Truth" sketch was originally the first of a two-parter, with the second segment (cut-for-time due to an overrunning live broadcast) from the dress rehearsal later uploaded online.; This episode was subject to an eleven minute delay in some markets due to an overrunning Washington–USC football game, but aired on time on NBC owned-and-operated stations.; This episode also holds the record for longest Weekend Update segment, running for 19 minutes and 55 seconds.
1011	3	Shane Gillis	Rosalía	October 10, 2026	4.42
Rosalía performs "Reliquia" and "Magnolias" and appears in the "Saying Goodbye" sketch.; The performance of "Reliquia" was excised from the episode's broadcast in the United Kingdom, but remains intact on streaming platforms.; Gillis's performance became the subject of two controversies: During the monologue, Gillis made a joke about how women at the gym "dress like whores now", which was widely criticized online as sexist.; Gillis accidentally said "fuck" during the "Green Eggs and Ham" sketch. This was censored (by an audio mute) on the West Coast broadcast, and internationally.
1012	4	Inde Navarrette	Gracie Abrams	October 31, 2026	5.16
Gracie Abrams performs "Hit the Wall" and "Here You Come, There You Go".; The performance of "Here You Come, There You Go" was excised from the episode's broadcast in the United Kingdom, but remains intact on streaming platforms.; Tom Hanks appears in the cold open reprising David S. Pumpkins, alongside Bobby Moynihan. Moynihan additionally appears as Drunk Uncle on Weekend Update.; Navarette's boyfriend, Nick Aiello, appears in the audience during the monologue.; Christian Yelich, Brice Turang, and Pat Murphy of the 2026 World Series champion Milwaukee Brewers appear on Weekend Update.; Before the goodnights, a video clip and classic SNL bumper containing a photo of Patrick Stewart, who hosted the show during season 19, and died earlier in the week, is shown in silence.; This episode was subject to an eight minute delay in some markets due to an overrunning Ohio State–USC football game.
1013	5	Druski	The Strokes	November 7, 2026	5.59
The Strokes perform "Lonely in the Future" and "Going Shopping" with Walton Goggins.; Senator-elect James Talarico appears in the cold open.; Druski's family and Emma Stone appear in the opening monologue.; Writer Carl Tart appears in the "Washington In Focus" and "Proposal" sketches.; Before the goodnights, a photo of Susan Saint James, who died on October 26, is shown in silence.; Dave Chappelle, Michael B. Jordan, Chris Rock, and Austin Butler appear in the goodnights.; This episode was subject to a ten minute delay in some markets due to an overrunning Miami–Notre Dame game.; With this episode, Druski became the first online content creator to host.
1014	6	John Mulaney	Phoebe Bridgers	November 14, 2026	4.45
Phoebe Bridgers performs "Bobby" and "Still Standing".; The performance of "Bobby" was excised from the episode's broadcast in the United Kingdom, but remains intact on streaming platforms.; Bowen Yang appears in the cold open as Jensen Huang, and additionally appears in the "Central Park Horse & Carriage Ride" sketch reprising his role as Mary Todd Lincoln from Oh, Mary!.; The episode's last photo bumper recreates the album cover of Television's Marquee Moon, featuring Mulaney as all four of the band's members; it is a tribute to Television guitarist Richard Lloyd, who died on November 7.
1015	7	Amanda Seyfried	Don Toliver	December 5, 2026	TBD
Confirmed on air.
1016	8	TBA	TBA	December 12, 2026	TBD
1017	9	TBA	TBA	December 19, 2026	TBD
1018	10	TBA	TBA	January 23, 2027	TBD
1019	11	TBA	TBA	January 30, 2027	TBD
1020	12	TBA	TBA	February 6, 2027	TBD
1021	13	TBA	TBA	February 27, 2027	TBD
1022	14	TBA	TBA	March 6, 2027	TBD
1023	15	TBA	TBA	March 13, 2027	TBD
1024	16	TBA	TBA	April 3, 2027	TBD
1025	17	TBA	TBA	April 10, 2027	TBD
1026	18	TBA	TBA	May 1, 2027	TBD
1027	19	TBA	TBA	May 8, 2027	TBD
1028	20	TBA	TBA	May 15, 2027	TBD
