= Roslyn Fuller =

Canadian-Irish author and columnist

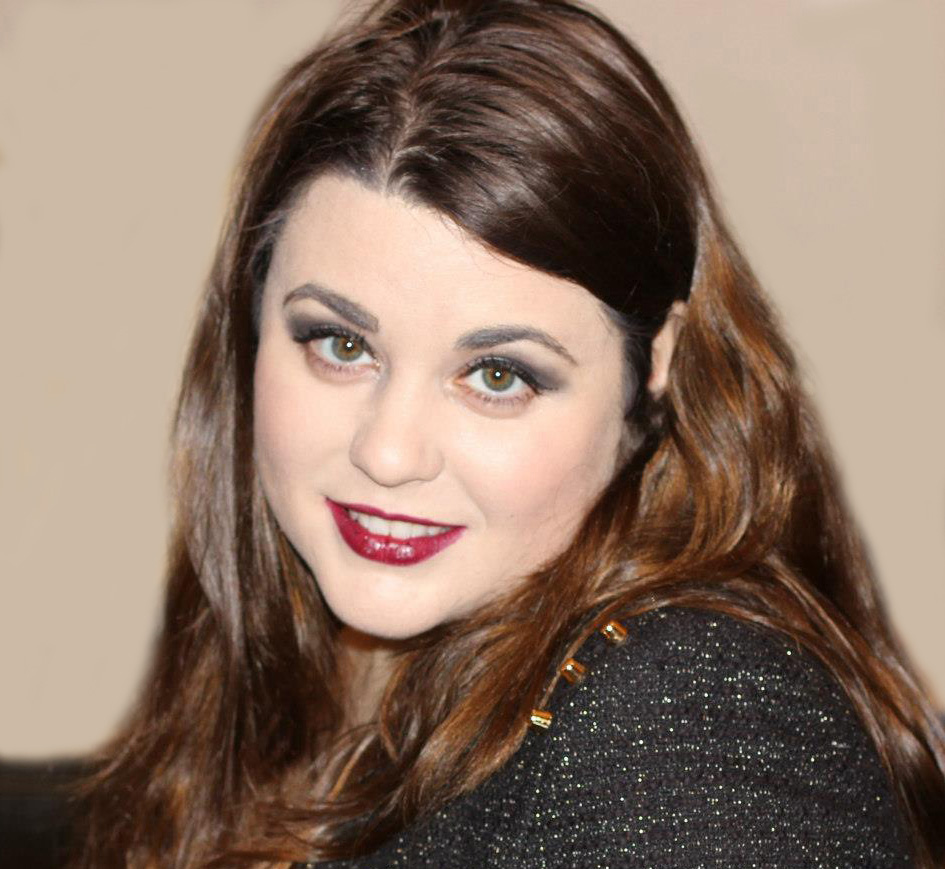
- Fuller in 2016
- Education: Clausthal University of Technology; University of Göttingen; Trinity College Dublin (Ph.D.)
- Occupations: Author, columnist
- Website: roslynfuller.com

Roslyn Fuller is a Canadian-Irish author and columnist. She is the author of Beasts and Gods: How Democracy Changed its Meaning and Lost its Purpose, In Defence of Democracy and Principles of Digital Democracy: Theory and Case Studies.

== Education ==
Fuller attended North Lambton Secondary School in Forest, Ontario. After finishing high school, Fuller moved to Europe at the age of 19 where she learned German at Clausthal University of Technology, and subsequently studied law with a focus on public international law and legal philosophy at the University of Göttingen.

She then wrote her Ph.D. at Trinity College Dublin, graduating in 2010 with a Ph.D. in law. She completed her dissertation on democracy and international law under thesis supervisor Gernot Biehler.

== Academia ==
Fuller lectured in law at Trinity College Dublin and Maynooth University, during which she compiled the second edition of Biehler on International Law: An Irish Perspective, which continued the work of Gernot Biehler, her thesis supervisor. She also authored academic articles on issues ranging from terrorism to participatory democracy and whistleblowing.

== Writing and views ==
=== Earlier works ===
Fuller wrote ISAK, her first novel, in 2005 while studying for the bar exam in Germany. The novel, which is set in the future, is an allegoric reflection of the issue of international terrorism, in particular questioning what precisely constitutes terrorism and which actions by governments or individuals can be subsumed under the term. In 2007, parts of the novel were adapted as a stage play performed at the Irish Writers' Centre.

In 2008, Fuller co-founded the Irish Writers' Exchange, an organisation of both Irish authors and writers from around the world who have chosen to make Ireland their home away from home. The group contributes book reviews of current and classic fiction for Dublin-based multi-cultural newspaper Metro Éireann. Fuller and her book ISAK were mentioned in the 2009 edition of German travel guide Marco Polo for Dublin.

In 2010, Fuller edited and contributed to Dublin: Ten Journeys, One Destination, a collection of short stories published by the Irish Writers' Exchange.

=== Beasts and Gods: Ancient & Digital Democracy ===
In 2015, Zed Books published Fuller's academic research into democracy as a general trade book: Beasts and Gods: How Democracy Changed its Meaning and Lost its Purpose. The book analyses the origins of democracy, its modern applications and the resulting loss of "people power". A contributor to Forbes called Beasts and Gods "a visionary thought experiment . . . guaranteed to make you think differently about the trillion dollar bureaucracies we call democracy today."

In Beast and Gods, Fuller outlines the shortcomings of modern democracy (statistical skewing, corruption, unaccountable politicians) and contrasts the design of modern western democratic systems with both the original democracy in ancient Athens and the Roman Republic, concluding that much of what we think of as democracy today, has in fact, deeply undemocratic, Roman Republican roots. Fuller traces the effects of this democratic deficit from national parliaments to international organisations such as the IMF, World Bank and the UN Security Council.

Fuller then applies the principles of Athenian democracy to modern systems in order to determine how we could use modern information technology to unlock the participatory potential of direct, digital democracy.

=== In Defence of Democracy ===
In 2019, Fuller followed up on Beasts and Gods with the publication of In Defence of Democracy, which disputes the theories of academics and writers across the political spectrum who believe that voters are either too stupid, too racist or too crazy for democracy. She argues that these ideas are based on questionable empirical research, and that democracy is not about "right" or "wrong" outcomes, but simply a method of mediating conflict. Fuller also demonstrates that one of the commonly proposed political reforms – randomly selecting citizens into citizen assemblies or decision-making bodies (also called sortition) – not only misconstrues the role sortition played in the ancient Athenian democracy but ultimately enhances elite control by limiting decisions to small, externally controllable groups.

In 2020, In Defense of Democracy was selected as a finalist for the Next Generation Indie Book Awards.

=== Principles of Digital Democracy: Theory and Case Studies ===
In 2023, Fuller authored Principles of Digital Democracy: Theory and Case Studies released through German academic publishing house De Gruyter Brill. presenting a unique look at real applications of digital democracy in practice and the theories behind them.

== Election campaign ==
In 2016, Fuller ran as an Independent candidate in the 2016 Irish general election on a platform of digital democracy.

She received 775 votes. Following the election, Roslyn has implemented her election promise of direct people participation by conducting the first Digital Democracy experiment in Ireland, in which she asked people in her electoral area of Dublin Fingal to discuss and decide on a number of local and national policy priorities. She has stated that she intends to take action on the outcome of the initiative as part of her election promise.

== Modeling ==
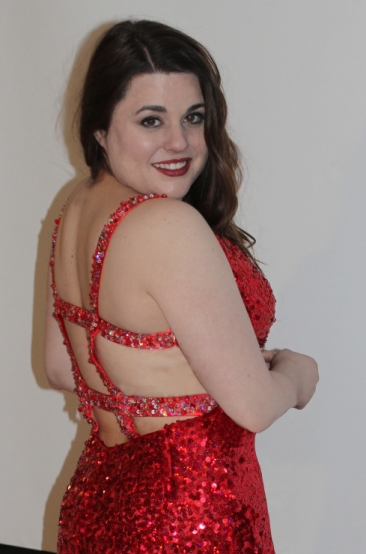
Fuller at the 2013 Irish Bodypainting Competition

Fuller worked as a model between 2005 and 2012, especially in the areas of fine art, glamour and nude art work. She has posed for some of Ireland's best-known photographers (Vincent O'Byrne, Mike Brown - in 2012 nominated for the Black Spider Award for one of his photos of Fuller) and artists (Isobel Henihan, Sahoko Blake, the RHA). She has also worked abroad in Germany, the UK and Canada and has popularised bodypainting in Ireland, having been chosen three times to model at the World Bodypainting Festival in Austria for special effects artist Raquel Guirro (Pan's Labyrinth). She is extremely short: only 4'10".

Articles about her have been published in Hotpress, the Sunday World, Irish News of the World, Irish Daily Star, Irish Daily Star on Sunday among others.

In 2009, she and bodypainter Nina Moore helped publicise the World Bodypainting Festival. From 2012 to 2014, Fuller organised the annual Irish Bodypainting Competition.

In 2013, Fuller set up Wikilicious.net to raise money for organisations supporting whistle-blowers. For the project she combined photos from her modelling career with information on whistle-blowers throughout recent history. The project has been widely covered in media around the world.
