= Saidah Belo-Osagie =

American comedian (born 1996)

- Born: October 12, 1996 (age 30)
- Education: University of Pennsylvania (BA)
- Occupations: Actress; comedian; filmmaker

Saidah Belo-Osagie (born October 12, 1996) is an American actress, comedian, and filmmaker. In September 2026, she joined the cast of Saturday Night Live as a featured player for its 52nd season.

== Early life ==
Belo-Osagie grew up in Elmont, New York, the daughter of Nigerian immigrants of Edo heritage. She has three younger brothers. In 2014, she graduated from the Spence School. She majored in philosophy, politics, and economics at the University of Pennsylvania, graduating in 2018. She also minored in film in college, and later enrolled in clown classes.

== Career ==
Belo-Osagie began her career as a development intern at Tribeca Productions, where she worked on the Netflix miniseries When They See Us. She then worked as an assistant for The Gotham Film & Media Institute, the ABC legal drama For Life, and the Netflix miniseries Kaleidoscope. In 2020, she released the short film Tinge, which she wrote and directed after college. She also created and hosted the event series Afrobeats Futura, a quarterly celebration of emerging Afrobeats music and African diaspora artists.

In August 2024, Belo-Osagie left her previous job to pursue a comedy career. She began posting sketches on social media in which she satirized New York City archetypes, creating characters such as "girl who's secretly happy her neighborhood's gentrifying". She also performed stand-up comedy and was a host for the digital series Are You Okay?. In 2025, she created a solo clown show, Saidah Gets Closure.

In September 2026, Belo-Osagie joined the long-running NBC sketch comedy show Saturday Night Live as a featured player for its 52nd season. She portrayed Nicki Minaj in the Halloween show, referring to her support at a Trump rally.
