= Sydney Topliffe =

Canadian actress

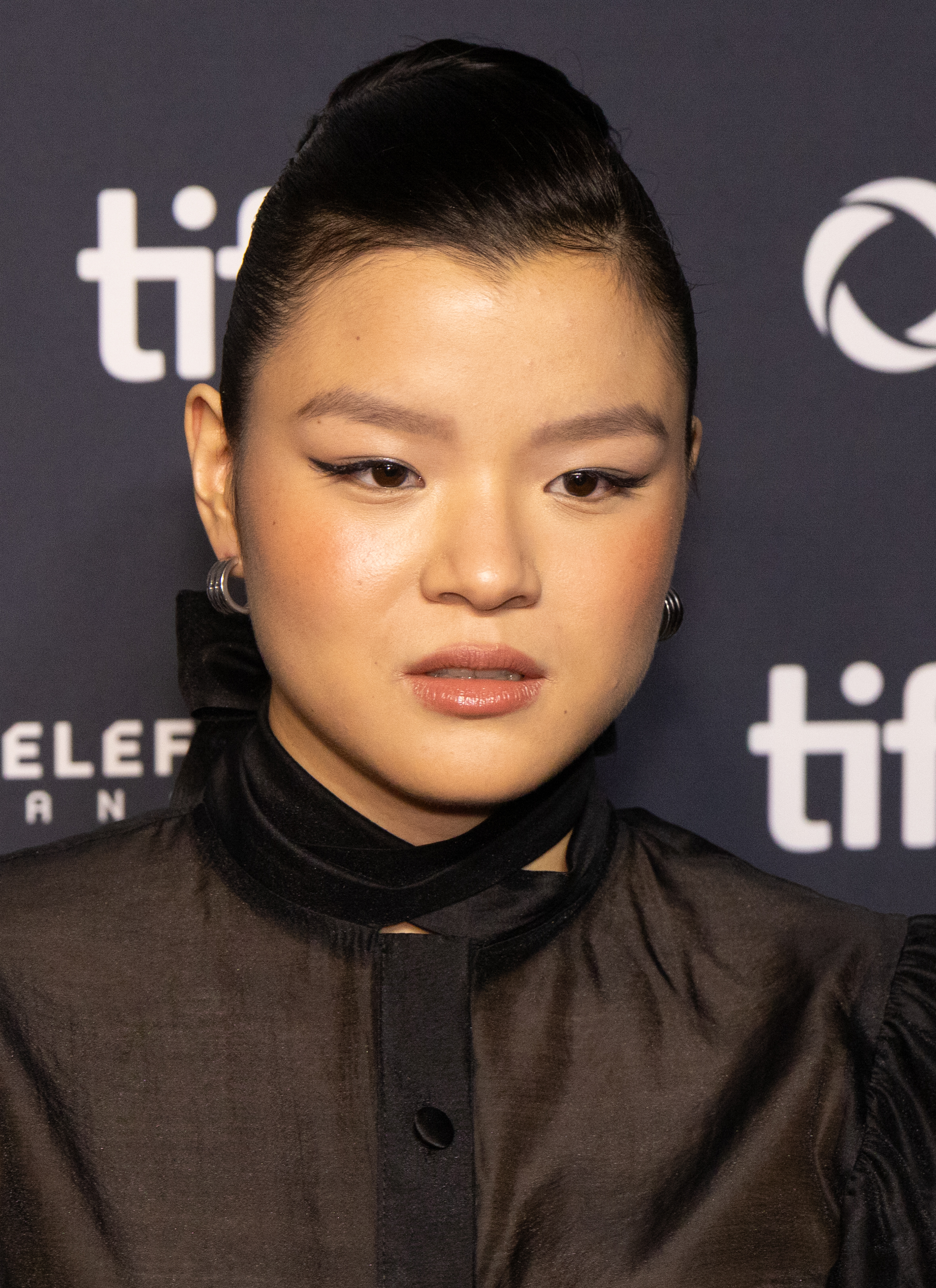
- Topliffe at TIFF 2025
- Education: Randolph College for the Performing Arts
- Occupation: Actress
- Years active: 2023-
- Television: Wayward

Sydney Topliffe is a Canadian television and film actress. Her television roles include Davey & Jonesie's Locker (2024) and Wayward (2025).

== Early life ==
Topliffe grew up in Plympton–Wyoming, Canada and later moved to Toronto. She became involved in the arts community in Lambton County involving herself in dance and music at the Great Lakes Dance Academy, as well as theatre at the Imperial Theatre and Theatre Sarnia and the Lambton County players. She later taught dance between auditions. She attended North Lambton Secondary School, and studied acting at Randolph College for the Performing Arts in Toronto.

== Career ==
Topliffe made her screen debut in the television series Murdoch Mysteries and co-starred in the science-fiction Hulu television series Davey & Jonesie's Locker as well as appearing in the 2024 series Ominous.

She portrayed a high school student in 2024 film Doin’ It with Lilly Singh, which had its world premiere at the SXSW Festival.

In 2025, she could be seen as Abbie, a dyslexic student sent to Tall Pines academy in the Mae Martin television drama series Wayward. After being cast as Abbie, Topliffe discussed the research she did for the show based on the letter Martin wrote to the cast describing Martin's friend's lived experience in one such school.

== Filmography ==
Key
†	Denotes works that have not yet been released

Year	Title	Role	Notes
2023	Murdoch Mysteries	Eunice	1 episode
2024	Doin’ It	Abby	Film
2024	Davey & Jonesie's Locker	Joyce	10 episodes
2024	Ominous	Brea	
2025	Wayward	Abbie	8 episodes
