= Are You Okay? (digital series) =

American comedy interview series

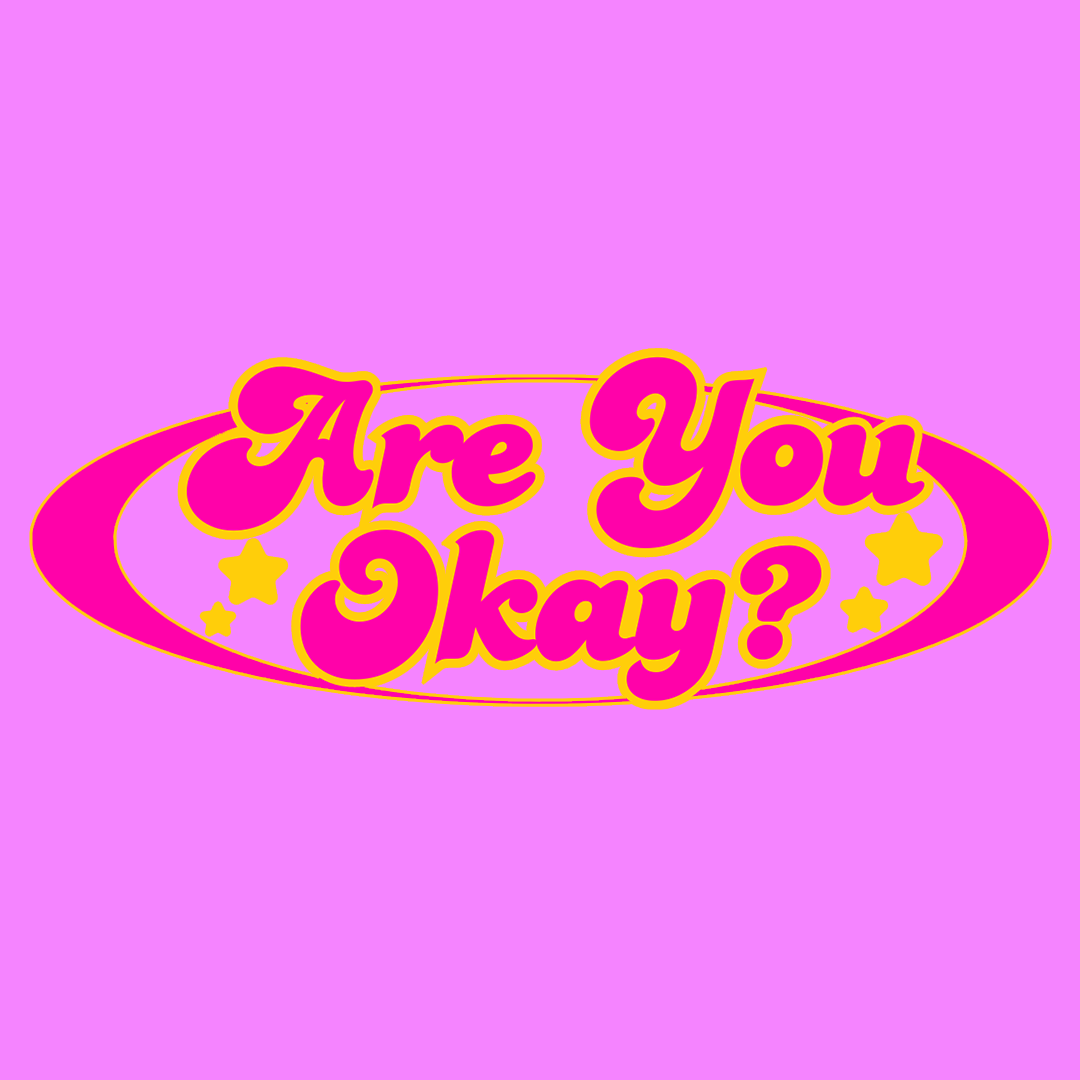
- Are You Okay? Logo
- Owner: NowThis

Are You Okay? is an American digital comedy interview series produced by NowThis. The series features a mix of celebrity interviews and man-on-the-street-style content. The show launched in 2024 under NowThis Editor-in-Chief Michael Vito Valentino as part of the company's rebrand toward Gen Z-focused original programming.

== Production ==
Are You Okay? was created after Michael Vito Valentino became the NowThis Editor-in-Chief in 2024. The show's short and funny style is designed to appeal to Gen Z. Each episode features hosts doing on-street interviews of celebrities, internet personalities, and ordinary people. The series is distributed across NowThis's social media platforms, including TikTok, Instagram, YouTube, Snapchat, and Facebook under the handle @areyouokayshow. As of 2026, the show's TikTok account has over 695,000 followers and 51.9 million likes.

In 2025, NowThis expanded the franchise with Are You Okay? Live!, a limited run live shows, with events in Los Angeles and Chicago

== Episodes ==
Are You Okay? is in an episodic or anthology series. Each episode has new personalities being interviewed. Notable interactions include:

- In a March 2025 episode, reality star Dylan Efron stated that "people shower too much". Some social media users responded negatively to his comments. He later clarified that he supports showering daily.
- In an August 2025 episode, Joe Jonas said that he accidentally high fived a flight attendant after having sex in the bathroom on a private airplane.
- Nick Jonas told the host that he only uses his bed for sleeping, not reading or sitting.
- The following month, Demi Lovato talked about accidentally sharing a nude photo with her friends.

Episodes can be found in short-form episodes or in condensed episodes on Are You Okay?'s platforms.

== Recognition ==
At the 30th Annual Webby Awards, the show won the Webby Award and People’s Voice Award for Interview or Talk Show, Social Content Series.
