= Wayward (miniseries) =

2025 Canadian television series

- Release poster
- Genre: Mystery; Thriller
- Created by: Mae Martin
- Showrunners: Mae Martin; Ryan Scott
- Starring: Mae Martin; Sarah Gadon; Alyvia Alyn Lind; Sydney Topliffe; Brandon Jay McLaren; Tattiawna Jones; Isolde Ardies; Joshua Close; Toni Collette
- Music by: Marie-Hélène L. Delorme
- Country of origin: Canada
- Original language: English
- No. of episodes: 8

Production
- Executive producers: Mae Martin; Ryan Scott; Ben Farrell; Hannah Mackay; Jennifer Kawaja; Bruno Dubé; Euros Lyn
- Producer: Anna Beben
- Cinematography: Catherine Lutes; Craig Wrobleski
- Editors: Dev Singh; D. Gillian Truster; Hugh Elchuk
- Running time: 40-50 minutes
- Production companies: Objective Fiction; Sphere Media

Original release
- Network: Netflix
- Release: September 25, 2025

Wayward is a Canadian mystery thriller limited series created by Mae Martin for Netflix. The series stars Mae Martin, Sarah Gadon, Alyvia Alyn Lind, Sydney Topliffe, Brandon Jay McLaren, and Toni Collette. The story is set in 2003 in the fictional town of Tall Pines, Vermont, and follows a pair of teenagers and a local police officer uncovering the town's dark secrets. It was released on Netflix on 25 September 2025.

== Premise ==
After attempting to escape from an academy for troubled teens, two students, Leila and Abbie, join forces with a newly appointed local police officer named Alex. They work to unearth the town's dark and deeply rooted secrets.

== Cast ==
=== Main ===
- Mae Martin as Alex Dempsey, a transgender man and young police officer, new to Tall Pines
- Sarah Gadon as Laura Redman, Alex's pregnant wife, former Tall Pines Academy student
- Alyvia Alyn Lind as Leila, a troubled teenager admitted to Tall Pines Academy after breaking in to rescue Abbie
- Sydney Topliffe as Abbie, Leila's best friend, sent to Tall Pines Academy by her parents in Toronto
- Brandon Jay McLaren as Dwayne Andrews, Alex's partner on the police force
- Tattiawna Jones as Rabbit, head of the girls at Tall Pines Academy
- Isolde Ardies as Stacey, Abbie's roommate at Tall Pines Academy
- Joshua Close as Duck, head of the boys at Tall Pines Academy
- Toni Collette as Evelyn Wade, head teacher at Tall Pines Academy

=== Recurring ===
- John Daniel as Rory, a Tall Pines Academy student who befriends Abbie
- Elizabeth Adams as Ello Griffen, a Tall Pines student and Leila's roommate
- Milton Torres Lara as Daniel, a Tall Pines student who was Riley's roommate before he fled
- Patrick J. Adams as Wyatt Turner, Leila and Abbie's guidance counsellor
- Gage Munroe as Riley, a student who goes missing from Tall Pines Academy
- Byron Mann as Brian, Abbie's strict father
- Jenny Raven as Carla, Abbie's mother
- Cynthia Ritchie as Claire, Abbie's overachieving sister
- Patrick Gallagher as Bartell, the Tall Pines chief of police
- Donald MacLean Jr. as Kyle, Leila's older boyfriend
- Geena Meszaros as Oatmeal Beth, a Tall Pines student
- Tricia Black as Mule, one of the Tall Pines Academy counselors
- Feaven Abera as Kendall, a Tall Pines student
- Maia Jae as Alexandra, a Tall Pines student
- Charlie Gibbard-McCall as Marty, a Tall Pines student
- Erik Junnola as Tanner, a Tall Pines student
- Devin Cecchetto as Jess, Leila's sister
- Christina Orjalo as Ashley, Jess' best friend
- Michaela Cannon as Harper, a Tall Pines local who befriends Laura
- Melanie Leishman as Ruby, a Tall Pines local who takes part in Laura's therapy group
- Carolyn Taylor as Terry, an officer on the Tall Pines police force
- Mark McKinney as Maurice, father of a former Tall Pines student

== Episodes ==
No.	Title	Directed by	Written by	Original release date
1	"Tall Pines"	Euros Lyn	Mae Martin	September 25, 2025
Leila and Abbie are best friends, spending time together skipping classes and getting high. Having enough of this behaviour and after having a fight with her father and mother when there were guests amongst them, Abbie's parents (when Abbie is asleep after getting back from strolling around with Leila) send her to Tall Pines Academy in Vermont. Across town, Alex and Laura move to Tall Pines to begin their upcoming family life. They find a strange hidden room with a painted door. While on duty, Alex comes across Riley, a student who fled the academy, who follows Alex home. In the ensuing confrontation, Riley is fatally wounded, and tells Alex of written evidence of strange occurrences at the academy before dying.
2	"Burrow"	Euros Lyn	Ryan Scott	September 25, 2025
Abbie meets the residents and staff of Tall Pines Academy, including head teacher Evelyn, head staff Rabbit and Duck, her roommate Stacey, and Riley's alleged best friend Rory, and is introduced to the school's strict rules. Leila, learning of Abbie's location, travels to Tall Pines with her older boyfriend, Kyle, who abandons her once she reveals her intentions. At Tall Pines, she meets Alex. She infiltrates the academy and briefly reunites with Abbie before being taken. At a grocery store, Alex notices odd behaviours from the townspeople. Evelyn dines with Alex and Laura, where she makes strange and cold comments about Laura's dead parents. In the room with the painted door, Alex discovers multiple blood stains on the ceiling, presumably from the floor above. Later that night, he finds Laura sleepwalking, trying to leave the house.
3	"Break"	Renuka Jeyapalan	Evangeline Ordaz	September 25, 2025
Leila and Abbie decide to escape the facility through a meticulous plan. They participate in "Hot Seat," a supposed therapy exercise in which the students criticize each other in hopes of self-improvement. Rory, deemed a pathological liar, is scolded off by the students until he suffers an emotional breakdown and is then comforted by the others. Terrified by the experience, Leila and Abbie speed up their plan, ending up locked in a flooded room with a door containing a fingernail after Oatmeal Beth tricks them. Alex discovers that the police station was previously a school. He visits the school to pick up Riley's possessions in hope of finding the written evidence he had mentioned. He encounters Abbie and Leila, who ask for help escaping. As they are discovered, Alex has Leila hit him, allowing him to secretly give Abbie a walkie-talkie so they can communicate. As punishment for hitting a police officer, Leila is subjected to the "Mirror Room", where she is psychologically tortured for the night. Abbie and Alex talk after Abbie sneaks into the bathroom after lights out.
4	"Mud"	Renuka Jeyapalan	Mohamad El Masri	September 25, 2025
Leila, alongside her roommate Ello, are made to carry rocks across a field as further punishment. She befriends Ello, learning she was a drug addict on her death bed before; Ello warns her to start following the system to get out. Meanwhile, Abbie meets Rory, Riley's roommate, to find the journal. Their search in the kitchen is unsuccessful when Daniel reveals both that the journal was found earlier by Duck, who later burns it, and that Rory lied about his friendship with Riley, leaving Abbie disgusted. Alex helps Laura open a market, where he realizes the town has no children besides the ones from the academy, and that the graduates are assigned to people, not adopted. Stacey reveals she was rewarded with something called a "Leap", which will grant her "total health", something she believes will help her finally get adopted. After telling the truth about his non-relationship to Riley and apologizing, Rory helps Abbie follow Stacey, where she discovers the "Leap" is a drug-induced torturous ritual in the flooded room, and learns Riley is dead. After Alex and Laura fight over the latter not telling him about the lack of children in town, Evelyn visits Laura, expressing her disappointment in the idea of the two leaving the town. Later that night, Alex finds Laura sleepwalking into the local pond.
5	"Build"	John Fawcett	Kim Steele	September 25, 2025
During the "Hot Seat," the students scold Abbie and Leila; their relationship takes a hit when Rabbit exposes Leila's use of cocaine. As revenge Leila reveals Riley's death and Rabbit's lies. An enraged Rory attacks Rabbit, and Daniel helps him by sedating her and then Stacey. It soon turns into a revolt, leaving the staff incapacitated as they are all sedated one by one with "booty juice". Daniel tortures Rabbit. Leila and Ello begin a relationship, but Ello relapses and begins to overdose. To rescue her, Abbie stops the revolt. Alex finds a website about local missing children, written by Maurice Iverson, and interrogates him under the guise of a freelance journalist. Maurice reveals that the school's staff has created misleading clues about the missing children, including Maurice's daughter Hannah. Alex finds a photograph of Laura and is attacked by Maurice, who believes Alex to be a spy. The fight ends with Alex overpowering Maurice and fleeing. Laura kills a toad in hope of ending her hallucinations. She then holds a baby shower, where she requests to Evelyn to cut ties.
6	"Mirror"	John Fawcett	Kayla Lorette	September 25, 2025
As punishment for their revolt, the students are forced to fight for freedom by reaching the summit of the local mount. Soon after beginning, Abbie and Rory are stripped of their resources, including Rory's inhaler. They meet Daniel and Marty, who assist each other in climbing. Abbie, prioritizing her freedom over the well-being of her fellow students, scolds Rory, but rescues him as he suffers an asthma attack. Stacey, supported by Rabbit, stabs Daniel, whose death is disguised as an escape attempt. Marty wins the competition, but his trick reward causes him to join the others. Abbie and Rory embrace. Evelyn uses her techniques to help Leila fight her trauma; after a party gone awry, Leila and Jess go by a pool. Realizing Jess' manipulative actions and insulting comments, Leila pushes Jess into a pool and watches her drown, admitting having never liked her. Alex discovers his house once belonged to a serial-killing cult. Alex is threatened by Dwayne, who killed Maurice and disguised it as suicide, in the cost of his silence. Laura returns to the pond and suffers another hallucination of her past.
7	"Ascend"	Euros Lyn	Alex Eldridge & Ryan Scott	September 25, 2025
In 1974, a young Evelyn is a member of a cult after being abandoned by her parents, later getting pregnant. To accomplish her Leap, she kills her leader and takes her place. In the present, it's revealed Ello was transferred to another school after her overdose and Rabbit is interested in adopting Stacey. Leila begins to appreciate the academy as she takes parts in enjoyable activities. Later, she discovers her mother has remortgaged the house and begun a relationship, not caring about the prospect of Leila returning home. Evelyn offers her the Leap ritual the next day. In a one-to-one "Hot Seat", Leila and Abbie exchange criticism, further straining their relationship. Dwayne watches over Alex and Laura on his birthday, the partners seemingly mend their relationship. After meeting Abbie to escape, Alex is attacked by Dwayne once he discovers Daniel's body. Laura begins a therapy group to overcome their common trauma caused by Evelyn, promising them to never leave.
8	"Leap"	Euros Lyn	Mae Martin & Misha Osherovich	September 25, 2025
Evelyn confronts Laura for her new therapy group, in which she reveals Alex is having the Leap. Stacey is given to an adoptive family, which Rabbit witnesses. The Leap goes wrong when Rabbit, feeling betrayed, uses the drug on Evelyn, causing the chain of events leading her to hallucinate the psychological torture she employed, and subsequently overdose. Before dying, Evelyn reveals that Laura murdered her parents. Alex flees to Laura, killing Dwayne along the way, and arrives as she gives birth. The baby is then passed around the townsfolk, leaving Alex visibly disturbed and upset while Laura is cold. Later that night, he contemplates leaving with the baby and Abbie as planned. Leila and Abbie rekindle their relationship after Leila confesses her feelings about Jess, to which Abbie reassures her on their friendship regardless. Later on, the students help Abbie, Leila, and Rory escape. Realizing her mother abandoned her, and having no future or proper care, Leila decides to go back. Abbie promises to return to her one day and the two separate. Cornered by the townspeople, Rory kisses Abbie and surrenders as a distraction, allowing Abbie to find Alex's car and flee Tall Pines. At the last moment, it seems as if Alex joins Abbie with the baby, but it is soon revealed to be only his fantasy, as he stayed behind with his child.

== Production ==
In April 2023, an eight-part series from Mae Martin was commissioned by Netflix with Martin also set to star. Martin acted as showrunner on the series alongside Ryan Scott, as well as executive producer. Production is through London and Los Angeles–based Objective Fiction and Canada’s Sphere Media. Scott also served as executive producer alongside Ben Farrell for Objective Fiction along with Hannah Mackay, Jennifer Kawaja and Bruno Dubé.

Brandon Jay McLaren joined the cast in May 2024. In June 2024, Sarah Gadon, Toni Collette, Patrick J. Adams, Alyvia Alyn Lind, Patrick Gallagher, Sydney Topliffe and Josh Close joined the cast.

The series was initially called Tall Pines. Filming began in Ontario, Canada, in mid-2024.

=== Themes ===
Martin said this is a story they have "been dying to tell for years." Martin's best friend in high school had been sent to a school for troubled teens, like Tall Pines, for two years, and later told them "insane stories" about the school's "weirdly theatrical aggressive therapy." Their friend's school was later shut down for abuse and neglect, and Martin eventually learned that such schools were largely unregulated and lacked transparency regarding their methods. Martin also learned that much of the troubled teen industry originated in 1970s self-help cults like Synanon, and this served as inspiration for the structure of Tall Pines. Martin's friend from high school served as a consultant for the show, and a writer on the show attended a similar school as well.

Martin says that Abbie and Leila are based on their relationship with their high school best friend, and the show is "like a love letter to that friendship, and to teen friendship." They wanted the show to produce an emotional connection in viewers rather than sharing a specific message.

Martin said that they wrote their character, Alex, as a trans man due to the show's setting in 2003. Martin is nonbinary, but they felt that there was not much public understanding of nonbinary identities at that time, so "who knows where I’ll end up on that spectrum?" They described Alex as a stand-in for audience members: he is an imperfect but earnest newcomer to town, skeptical of his surroundings even as he longs to be accepted.

Martin also wanted the show to explore the themes of acceptance and ignorance of unjust systems. Joining cults is one metaphor for this, as is Alex's hunt for acceptance and a heteronormative family life, and teenage rebellion shows a contrasting approach to injustice.

== Release ==
Wayward premiered in the Primetime program at the 2025 Toronto International Film Festival, in advance of its streaming release on Netflix on 25 September 2025.

== Reception ==
The review aggregator website Rotten Tomatoes reported a 78% approval rating based on 54 critic reviews. The website's critics consensus reads, "An eerie mystery that eschews easy answers, Wayward can occasionally feel as listless as its title, but surprising twists and Toni Collette's committed performance keep this thriller intriguing." Metacritic, which uses a weighted average, gave a score of 71 out of 100 based on 18 critics, indicating "generally favorable".

In September 2026, Euros Lyn received a best director nomination for work on the series at the BAFTA Cymru Awards.
