= Davey & Jonesie's Locker =

Canadian comedy series

- Genre: Teen comedy; Science fiction
- Created by: Evany Rosen
- Starring: Veronika Slowikowska; Jaelynn Thora Brooks
- Countries of origin: Canada; United States
- Original language: English
- No. of seasons: 1
- No. of episodes: 10

Production
- Executive producers: Mark J.W. Bishop; Matt Hornburg; Diane Rankin; Carrie Paupst Shaughnessy; A.J. Trauth; Evany Rosen
- Production company: Marblemedia

Original release
- Network: Amazon Prime Video (Canada); Hulu (United States)
- Release: March 22, 2024

Davey & Jonesie's Locker is a science fiction teen comedy television series created by Evany Rosen and co-commissioned by Amazon Prime Video and Hulu. The series stars Veronika Slowikowska and Jaelynn Thora Brooks as two high school students who discover that their locker is a portal to the multiverse.

== Premise ==
Davey (Slowikowska) and Jonesie (Brooks) are outcast best friends at Schrödinger High School who discover that their locker contains a portal to the multiverse. Built by their science teacher, Mr. Schneider, the portal transports the girls to alternate versions of their high school.

Along the way, Davey and Jonesie are chased by the Delinquent Acquisition Deputy (D.A.D) from the Management Organisation of the Multiverse (M.O.M), which aims to put them in the Detention Dimension and wipe the girls' memories of each other.

== Cast and characters ==
- Veronika Slowikowska as Davey
- Jaelynn Thora Brooks as Jonesie
- Dan Beirne as Mr. Schneider, a high school science teacher
- Emily Piggford as Cheryl
- Evany Rosen as Principal Debbie Neighbors
- Nikko Angelo Hinayo as Emile
- Kevin Lauta Osea as Abbott
- Erika Swayze as Sierra
- Sydney Xiaolang Topliffe as Joyce
- Alexa Yaphe as Alexis
- Parker Lauzon as Mark R. Shirt
- James Hartnett as Andy

== Production ==
=== Filming ===
In June 2023, Variety reported that Marblemedia had wrapped production on the series, which was shot in Toronto.
