= Veronika Slowikowska =

Canadian actress and comedian (born 1995)

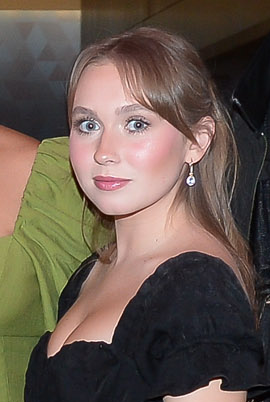
- Slowikowska in 2019
- Born: October 29, 1995 (age 31); Barrie, Ontario, Canada
- Education: Randolph College for the Performing Arts; Canadian Film Centre (PgCert)
- Years active: 2016–present

Veronika Slowikowska (born October 29, 1995) is a Canadian actress and comedian. She gained attention for her Internet sketch comedy and her recurring role as Shanice in the horror comedy series What We Do in the Shadows (2019–2020). Slowikowska went on to appear in the comedy drama film I Like Movies (2022) and the romantic comedy film EXmas (2023). She also had a lead role in the science fiction comedy series Davey & Jonesie's Locker (2024) and a recurring role in season 2 of the Netflix comedy series Tires. In 2025, Slowikowska joined Saturday Night Live as a season 51 cast member.

== Early life ==
Slowikowska was born in Barrie, Ontario, shortly after her parents immigrated to Canada from Poland. She attended St. Joan of Arc Catholic High School and later graduated from the Randolph College for the Performing Arts in 2015. In 2020, she graduated from the Canadian Film Centre's Actor's Conservatory.

== Career ==
Slowikowska began her comedy career in Toronto, performing improv at the Bad Dog Theatre Company. She was a member of the troupes Hilary Duff Fan Club and My Chemical Bromance. She appeared in a recurring role as Shanice in the first two seasons of What We Do in the Shadows.

In 2019, Slowikowska was a part of Bad Dog Theatre Company’s Featured Player.

In 2020, Slowikowska released the single "So Many Lies" to promote the upcoming Heartland series Becoming Alex. The follow-up single, "Homesick", was released in 2021.

Slowikowska starred as Greta Hansen in the 2022 CBC Television comedy series Homeschooled and appeared as Amber Whitelaw in the OutTV horror comedy series EZRA.

In 2023, Slowikowska launched the podcast nevermind. with co-host Kyle Chase and appeared in the Amazon Freevee original Christmas movie EXmas. The following year, she starred as Davey in Davey & Jonesie's Locker, an Amazon Prime Video and Hulu co-production.

On September 2, 2025, it was announced that Slowikowska would be joining season 51 of Saturday Night Live as a featured player. Slowikowska was confirmed to be returning for her second season of SNL, continuing as a featured player for the 52nd season, which premiered on September 26, 2026.

In 2025, Slowikowska began releasing music anonymously under the moniker Me As A Girl. Her first single, titled "When You Had Me You Ran Away", was released on November 21, 2025. Slowikowska revealed herself as Me As A Girl with the release of the 2026 single "I Don't Know Why I Said That".

== Personal life ==
Slowikowska resides in New York City.

== Filmography ==
=== Film ===
Year	Title	Role	Notes
2016	Viable	Violet	Short film
2017	Dawn Hughes and the Rise of Eve Fantastic	Dawn Hughes / Eve Fantastic	Short film
2018	Hector	Anna	Short film
2018	Greta Follows Rivers	Kay	Short film
2022	I Like Movies	Tabitha	
2023	Love Machine	She	Short film
2023	Middle Sized Things	Veronika	Short film
2023	EXmas	Mindy	
2026	One Night Only	P.A.	Cameo
TBA	The Gene Pool †	Addy	Completed
TBA	Stephanie, Bride to Be †	Stephanie	Filming

Key
†	Denotes films that have not yet been released

=== Television ===
Year	Title	Role	Notes
2016	See No Evil	Katie Poirier	Episode: "Snatched on Camera"
2017	Degrassi: Next Class	Marjorie	Episode: "#RollUpToTheClubLike"
2019–2020	What We Do in the Shadows	Shanice	5 episodes
2020	Baroness von Sketch Show	Kayla	Episode: "Don't Call Me Lady"
2021	Murdoch Mysteries	Ms. Roberta Haycroft	Episode: "Shock Value"
2021	Clarice	Raisa	Episode: "Family Is Freedom"
2021	Nurses	Kirsten Whitt	Episode: "Chaos Magnet"
2022	Homeschooled	Greta Hansen	9 episodes
2022	EZRA	Amber Whitelaw	8 episodes
2024	Davey & Jonesie's Locker	Davey	10 episodes
2025	Tires	Kelly	6 episodes
2025	Poker Face	Cliff	Episode: "The Sleazy Georgian"
2025	Ghosting	Herself	Episode: "Case 204: The Mine"
2025	Saturday Night Live	Herself/Various	Featured player (From Season 51)

== Discography ==
=== As Veronika ===
Year	Title	Album
2020	"So Many Lies"	Non-album singles
2021	"Homesick"	Non-album singles

=== As Me As A Girl ===
==== Singles ====
- 'When you had me you ran away" (featuring Helena Gao) (2025)
- "I Don't Know Why I Said That" (2026)

==== EP ====
- Its all possible (2025)
