= Tommy Brennan =

American comedian (born 1994)

- Born: Thomas Brennan Schneeman; June 1, 1994 (age 32); St. Paul, Minnesota, U.S.
- Education: University of Notre Dame (BS)

Comedy career
- Years active: 2018–present
- Medium: Stand-up; television
- Genres: Observational comedy; sketch comedy; political satire; satire
- Subjects: American culture; everyday life; human behavior; family; pop culture; midwestern culture
- Website: somekidtommy.com

Thomas Brennan Schneeman (born June 1, 1994), known professionally as Tommy Brennan, is an American stand-up comedian and actor from St. Paul, Minnesota. In 2025, he joined the cast of Saturday Night Live for season 51 as a featured player.

== Early life ==
Brennan grew up in a family of eight children, six sisters and one brother, and has Irish Catholic ancestry. He enjoyed attention from a young age but was not always "the funny guy", noting that "the comedian isn’t the class clown, it’s the person who puts the class clown up to it."

He was involved in school shows, and played The Little Prince in a theatre production. He graduated from Cretin-Derham Hall High School in 2012. He then attended Mendoza College of Business at the University of Notre Dame, where he was elected Senior Class President, was a highly successful proprietor of Yaz’s (a student run restaurant in Morrissey Manor, where he was also the hall mascot) and studied accounting.

== Career ==
Brennan lived in Chicago and started improv at The Second City. Unable to meet his desire for frequent performances, he switched to standup in order to perform multiple comedy shows in a night. He worked at Cameo and LinkedIn before pursuing stand-up full time in 2023. He has opened for Nikki Glaser, Taylor Tomlinson, and Louie Anderson. Brennan was named "New Face of Comedy" at 2023 at the Just for Laughs festival in Montreal. In June 2025, he made his national television debut performing stand-up comedy on The Tonight Show Starring Jimmy Fallon.

Brennan started a podcast and web series called "Roommates-In-Law" with his friend Tim Smith while they were bored during the COVID-19 pandemic. "I would go over to his house and we would riff, drink and talk for hours and come up with some more ideas," Brennan said in a 2023 interview. Though they only had one suitable sketch after their first few weeks, Brennan said they "had so much free time to make it better." He credits John Mulaney with showing him that comedians don't have to have terrible upbringings to be funny.

In September 2025, Brennan was announced as joining the cast of Saturday Night Live for season 51. Brennan was confirmed to be returning for his second season of SNL, continuing as a featured player for the 52nd season, which premiered on September 26, 2026.

== Filmography ==
=== Television ===
Year	Title	Role	Notes
2020	Roommates-in-Law	Tommy	TV Mini Series; Also writer
2025–present	Saturday Night Live	Various	Featured Player
