= Kam Patterson =

American comedian (born 1999)

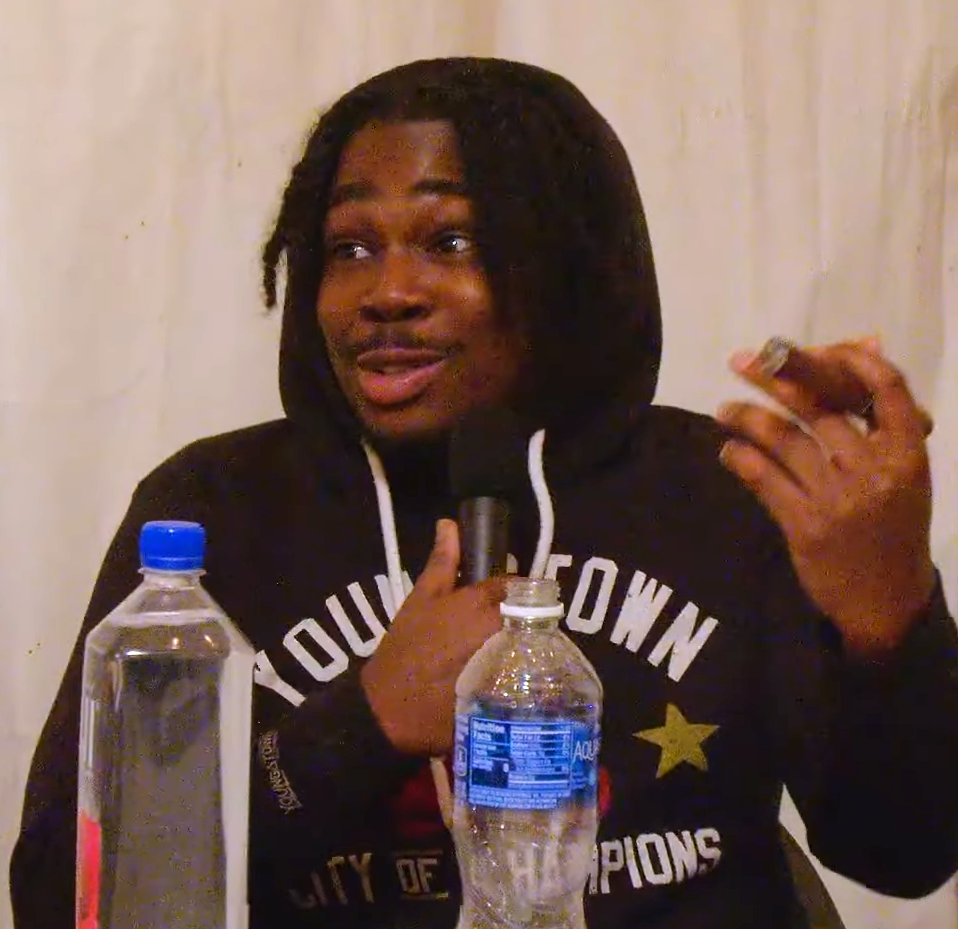
- Patterson in 2024
- Born: Kameron Evan Patterson; April 10, 1999 (age 27); Orlando, Florida, U.S.

Comedy career
- Years active: 2021–present
- Medium: Stand-up; television; film
- Genres: Observational comedy; shock humor; insult comedy; racial humor; satire; blue comedy
- Subjects: African-American culture; Everyday life; pop culture; race relations
- Website: kamsoofunny.com

Kameron Evan "Kam" Patterson (born April 10, 1999) is an American stand-up comedian and actor. In 2025, he made his debut in the cast of Saturday Night Live for season 51 and in 2026 co-starred in the Netflix comedy 72 Hours. Patterson first gained attention for his appearances on the live stand-up comedy podcast Kill Tony.

== Early life and career ==
Patterson grew up in Orlando, Florida. While attending Orlo Vista Elementary, his second grade teacher allowed him to tell jokes in front of class as a reward for finishing his schoolwork.

Before pursuing comedy, Patterson was unsure about his future and considered firefighting. He became inspired to perform while working at Foot Locker and receiving motivation from his co-workers and father. In 2021, he began performing comedy sets at open mics in Orlando.

In 2022, Patterson was invited to open for comedian Jason Banks. He then moved to Austin, Texas, where his appearances on the stand-up comedy podcast Kill Tony dramatically increased his appeal. His "I Like Rocks" joke became a viral fan-favorite moment on the show and a recurring routine during his appearances on the show and in his stand-up. He performed with Kill Tony at the Madison Square Garden arena in 2024, and toured with Kill Tony in 2025 as one of four comedians called "Killers of Kill Tony".

In October 2025, Patterson joined the cast of the 51st season of Saturday Night Live (SNL), where he made his first appearance on Weekend Update during his debut episode. Other memorable Weekend Update appearances by Patterson in his first season included playing "Black Snape" and Michael Irvin.

In 2026, Patterson appeared in the comedy film Busboys and also co-stars alongside SNL castmates and fellow comedians Marcello Hernández and Ben Marshall in the Netflix comedy film 72 Hours starring Kevin Hart, which was released on July 24, 2026.

In August 2026, Patterson was announced to have joined the cast of the upcoming romantic comedy film Love Love from Amazon MGM Studios.

Patterson was confirmed to be returning for his second season of SNL, continuing as a featured player for the 52nd season, which premiered on September 26, 2026.
