= Recurring Saturday Night Live characters and sketches introduced 2017–18 =

The following is a list of recurring Saturday Night Live characters and sketches introduced during the forty-third season of SNL, which began on September 30, 2017.

== Marketing Campaign ==
A woman (Cecily Strong) and her significant other, played by the host, react angrily when they realize that their favorite restaurant is instead just the new campaign for a fast food restaurant.

Season	Episode	Host	Notes
43	September 30, 2017	Ryan Gosling	Terrezano's is revealed to be a set up for the new Pizza Hut campaign.
44	September 29, 2018	Adam Driver	Domenico's is revealed to be a set up for the new Burger King campaign.

== Angel, Every Boxer's Girlfriend from Every Movie About Boxing Ever ==
Heidi Gardner plays Angel, a stereotypical girlfriend of a boxer, who appears on Weekend Update to give their "Good News Report". Angel will tell Michael Che that she is upset her boyfriend is "fighting again" and then expresses frustration with each piece of good news Michael asks her to comment on, such as a rise in holiday spending or the Royal Wedding. Her sketches occasionally make mention of the Boston area, such as her sister's address being "555 Whitey Bulger Way." Angel's catchphrase is "I'm taking the kids to my sisters", said as an ultimatum if her boyfriend fights again or if something else angering her does not go her way.

Season	Episode	Host	Notes
43	November 4, 2017	Larry David	
43	April 7, 2018	Chadwick Boseman	
44	December 15, 2018	Matt Damon	Damon appears as Tommy Ray Donovan, Angel's boyfriend.
48	January 28, 2023	Michael B. Jordan	Jordan appears as Adonis Creed

== Fresh Takes ==
A high school live news show hosted by three students and one teacher, played by the host. The teacher is disturbingly up-to-date on all the teenage gossip.

Season	Episode	Host	Notes
43	November 4, 2017	Larry David	
44	February 16, 2019	Don Cheadle	

== Lazlo Holmes ==
Lazlo Holmes (Chance the Rapper), a basketball correspondent, is forced to cover games that he doesn't have knowledge about.

In addition to the SNL sketches, Chance the Rapper also plays Holmes in web-exclusive interviews of hockey players on the official NHL YouTube channel.

Season	Episode	Host	Notes
43	November 18, 2017	Chance the Rapper	Lazlo covers a hockey game.
45	October 26, 2019	Chance the Rapper	Lazlo covers a League of Legends gaming tournament.

== Sexual Harassment Charlie ==
At an office, a worker (played by the host) is being fired and insulted by their co-workers for allegedly inappropriate remarks, but Charlie (Kenan Thompson) is beloved by office workers, despite consistently saying extremely over-the-top comments.

Season	Episode	Host	Notes
43	December 9, 2017	James Franco	
45	December 14, 2019	Scarlett Johansson	
50	December 14, 2024	Chris Rock	Bowen Yang continues the tradition of twirling to his mark at the top of this sketch. Cecily Strong had twirled to her mark in the previous two renditions.

== Cousin Mandy ==
An off-kilter woman, Mandy (Heidi Gardner), reunites with her famous cousins.

Season	Episode	Host	Notes
43	December 9, 2017	James Franco	Mandy attends a reunion with James and Dave Franco.
45	April 25, 2020	Brad Pitt	Mandy talks to her cousin Paul Rudd over FaceTime.

== Science Room ==
A vintage PBS science show where the host Mr. Science, played every time by the host(s), tries to explain science in front of two unintelligent kids, Lonnie (Cecily Strong) and Josh (Mikey Day), but each time they fail, through a combination of Josh's complete ignorance and Lonnie's naive use of sexual references, mostly coming from her sister.

Season	Episode	Host	Notes
43	January 13, 2018	Sam Rockwell	Rockwell infamously dropped the F-bomb during this sketch.
45	January 25, 2020	Adam Driver	
47	October 23, 2021	Jason Sudeikis	Melissa Villaseñor and Kyle Mooney appear as Lonnie and Josh's parents, respectively.
48	December 10, 2022	Steve Martin and Martin Short	This marked the final sketch appearance, as Strong left the show following the December 17, 2022 episode.

== Dog Head Man ==
A scientist (played by Mikey Day)'s latest cutting-edge project, a dog's head on a human body, confuses investors.

Season	Episode	Host	Notes
43	January 13, 2018	Sam Rockwell	
47	November 20, 2021	Simu Liu	

== Bailey Gismert ==
Teenage film critic Bailey Gismert (Heidi Gardner) reviews movies on Weekend Update. She is extremely ditzy and overemotional, and she tends to harbor nonsensical crushes on inappropriate movie characters (such as Pikachu) under the impression that they are real people.

Season	Episode	Host	Notes
43	January 27, 2018	Will Ferrell	
43	May 12, 2018	Amy Schumer	
44	May 11, 2019	Emma Thompson	
45	October 12, 2019	David Harbour	
45	April 11, 2020	Tom Hanks	
46	December 5, 2020	Jason Bateman	

== Dinner Discussion ==
A group of friends (Kenan Thompson, Kate McKinnon, Aidy Bryant, Beck Bennett and the host) eating at a restaurant overreact when a woman (played by Heidi Gardner) brings up a divisive political topic.

Season	Episode	Host	Notes
43	January 27, 2018	Will Ferrell	
47	February 26, 2022	John Mulaney	

== Big Nick's ==
A man, initially played by Pete Davidson, and later by Andrew Dismukes, while accompanied by his friend (Chris Redd), asks business owner Big Nick (John Mulaney) to do something that is socially frowned upon. As a consequence, an ensemble, including both humans and anthropomorphic objects, join Big Nick in singing versions of songs from musicals.

Season	Episode	Host	Notes
43	April 14, 2018	John Mulaney	Davidson's character asks for lobster in Big Nick's diner. The ensemble, including Kenan Thompson and Kate McKinnon as singing lobsters, perform versions of songs from Les Misérables. This sketch was originally written for Zach Galifianakis' episode in Season 35, but never made it to the air, nor was it cut for time.
44	March 2, 2019	John Mulaney	Davidson's character asks to use the bathroom in Big Nick's bodega. Mulaney plays the bodega's owner. The ensemble, including Kenan Thompson as a cat version of Willy Wonka; Melissa Villaseñor and Cecily Strong as cockroaches; Kate McKinnon as a Virgin Mary prayer candle; Mikey Day, Aidy Bryant, and Kyle Mooney as Sour Patch Kids dressed like Oompa Loompas; and Alex Moffat as a guy watching TV, perform versions of songs from Willy Wonka and the Chocolate Factory, Cats, and Rent. Beck Bennett voices a toilet inspired by Audrey II from Little Shop of Horrors.
45	February 29, 2020	John Mulaney	Davidson's character asks to buy sushi at Big Nick's store at LaGuardia Airport. The ensemble, including Kenan Thompson as a bird version of the Phantom of the Opera; Cecily Strong as a sushi chef; Alex Moffat as a rat; Chloe Fineman as an air-hostess; Kate McKinnon as "Auntie Orphan Annie," Beck Bennett as a baby; Jake Gyllenhaal as "Guy Who Travels in Pajamas"; Mikey Day as a gate agent; Bowen Yang as "profiled Asian"; and David Byrne as a baggage handler, perform versions of songs from The Phantom of the Opera, West Side Story, Annie, Wicked, Little Shop of Horrors, and Talking Heads' "Road to Nowhere".
46	October 31, 2020	John Mulaney	Davidson's character asks to buy a pair of I ❤ NY underpants from Big Nick's Souvenirs shop during the COVID-19 pandemic and the 2020 United States presidential election. The ensemble, including Kenan Thompson, Bowen Yang, Melissa Villaseñor, Lauren Holt, and Alex Moffat as Times Square costumed characters of a Minion, Batman, Minnie Mouse, Elsa, and Elmo; Kate McKinnon as Shrimp Louie; Beck Bennett as the "Diddler on the Roof"; Maya Rudolph as the Statue of Liberty; Chloe Fineman as a "woman from Westchester"; and Mikey Day as a homeless person, perform versions of songs from Guys and Dolls, A Chorus Line, A Little Night Music, Fiddler on the Roof, Follies, Sweet Charity, and Les Misérables.
47	February 26, 2022	John Mulaney	Dismukes's character asks to buy a churro from a random woman (Villaseñor) in an F train subway station. The ensemble, including Kenan Thompson as a mole person; Sarah Sherman, James Austin Johnson, and Aristotle Athari as B&H Photo employees dressed like characters from Fiddler on the Roof; Cecily Strong as a woman on the tracks; Ben Marshall as a "finance bro"; Mikey Day as a guy with a knife; Punkie Johnson as the train operator; Alex Moffat as a public masturbator; Kyle Mooney as Evan Hansen, Kate McKinnon as a "Puddle of Unidentifiable Origin"; LCD Soundsystem as the Guardian Angels; and Aidy Bryant as "Jesus Christ" in a New York Islanders beer helmet, perform versions of songs from South Pacific, Fiddler on the Roof, Little Shop of Horrors, The Music Man, Singin' in the Rain, Dreamgirls, Les Misérables, and Jesus Christ Superstar.
50	November 2, 2024	John Mulaney	Davidson's character asks to buy milk from a Duane Reade inside the Port Authority Bus Terminal. The ensemble, including Kenan Thompson and Ego Nwodim as possums; Sarah Sherman as an elderly lady; James Austin Johnson and Michael Longfellow as bums in taking part in Bumfights; Mikey Day as a soldier; Marcello Hernández as a shampoo bottle; Bowen Yang as the bus driver who is an escaped felon; Chloe Fineman as someone in a Timothée Chalamet lookalike contest; Devon Walker as Mayor Eric Adams; Andy Samberg as "the dead bear that RFK Jr. dumped in Central Park"; Jane Wickline as a "carton of milk that's come to life"; and Emil Wakim as "Jewish Christopher Columbus", perform versions of songs from The Lion King, The Sound of Music, Les Misérables, Cabaret, Aladdin, Hamilton, and Grease.
50	February 16, 2025	50th Anniversary Special	In 1975, David Spade's character announces he's moving to New York City, while Davidson's character asks to buy a hot dog laced with heroin from Big Nick's hot dog cart. The ensemble, including Adam Driver as a hot dog; Maya Rudolph as a needle of heroin, Emil Wakim as a taxi driver; Alex Moffat as a subway rider; Paul Shaffer and G. E. Smith as guitarists; Nathan Lane and Chloe Fineman as Wall Street brokers ingesting cocaine and vodka; Jason Sudeikis, Will Forte, and Kristen Wiig as costumed characters; Kate McKinnon as former Mayor Rudy Giuliani; Lin-Manuel Miranda as Alexander Hamilton; Beck Bennett and Kyle Mooney as Founding Fathers; Sarah Sherman as former Mayor Michael Bloomberg; Devon Walker as former Mayor Eric Adams, Scarlett Johansson and Paul Rudd as skid row residents; James Austin Johnson as a bottle of whiskey; Kenan Thompson as the singing lobster; Rudolph as the Statue of Liberty; Cecily Strong as the sushi chef; Nick Jonas as Marius Pontmercy; Taran Killam as Pizza Rat, and Ana Gasteyer as a pigeon, perform versions of songs from Fame, The Lion King, Les Misérables, Hamilton, and Little Shop of Horrors. Kevin Costner, Billy Crystal, Jenna Ortega, and Ben Stiller cameo as audience members.

== Mattel Instagram Pitch ==
Three interns, played by Pete Davidson, Heidi Gardner, and the host, pitch Instagram captions to Mattel employees, played by Kenan Thompson and Cecily Strong, that escalate in bizarreness.

Season	Episode	Host	Notes
43	May 5, 2018	Donald Glover	The interns pitch Instagram captions for Barbie's account.
44	January 19, 2019	Rachel Brosnahan	The interns pitch for Ken's account.

Preceded by Recurring Saturday Night Live characters and sketches introduced 2016–17	Recurring Saturday Night Live characters and sketches (listed chronologically)	Succeeded by Recurring Saturday Night Live characters and sketches introduced 2018–19
