= Saturday Night Live season 50 =

Saturday Night Live
- Season 50
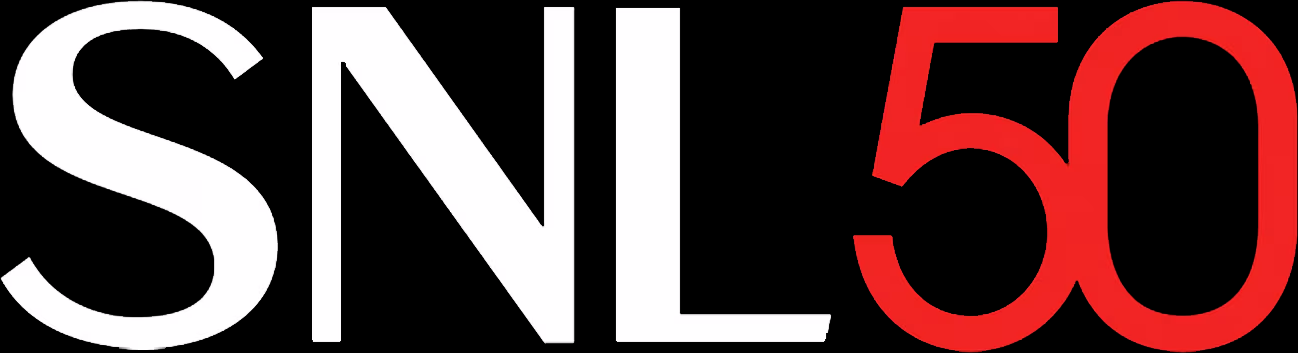
- No. of episodes: 20

Release
- Original network: NBC; Peacock
- Original release: September 28, 2024 – May 17, 2025

Season chronology
- ← Previous season 49 Next → season 51

The fiftieth season of the American sketch comedy late night television program Saturday Night Live (also branded Saturday Night Live 50 and SNL50: The Anniversary Season) premiered on September 28, 2024 on NBC and Peacock, with host Jean Smart and musical guest Jelly Roll, and concluded on May 17, 2025 with host Scarlett Johansson and musical guest Bad Bunny. In addition to the standard episodes hosted by celebrity guests and featuring musical acts, the series also had several months of acknowledgements, leading to a three-hour celebratory 50th anniversary special retrospective, which aired on February 16, 2025.

== Cast ==
Prior to the start of the season, Punkie Johnson, who had been on the show for four seasons since 2020, and featured player Molly Kearney, who had been on the show for two seasons since 2022, made the decision to leave after the conclusion of the previous season. Following Johnson and Kearney's departures, fellow featured player Chloe Troast was let go after only one season on the show. The show subsequently added three new cast members: Ashley Padilla of The Groundlings, stand-up comic Emil Wakim, and TikTok sketch comedian Jane Wickline.

Marcello Hernández, Michael Longfellow and Devon Walker, all of whom joined the cast in 2022, were promoted to repertory status.

In addition, SNL alums Dana Carvey, Maya Rudolph and Andy Samberg and actor/stand-up comic Jim Gaffigan, play Joe Biden, Kamala Harris, Doug Emhoff and Tim Walz, respectively, in the lead-up to the November 5, 2024 presidential election. Carvey and Samberg continued to make brief guest appearances, with Carvey continuing to portray the role of Biden. Another SNL alum Mike Myers also returned to the show to portray Elon Musk for three episodes after Carvey portrayed Musk on the episode following the presidential election.

This was the final season for Heidi Gardner, Ego Nwodim (who voluntarily left after having been a cast member since 2018), Longfellow and Walker (who were also let go, both joined the show in 2022), and the only season for Wakim (who was also let go).

**Repertory players**

- **Michael Che**
- Mikey Day
- Andrew Dismukes
- Chloe Fineman
- Heidi Gardner
- Marcello Hernández
- James Austin Johnson
- **Colin Jost**
- Michael Longfellow
- Ego Nwodim
- Sarah Sherman
- Kenan Thompson
- Devon Walker
- Bowen Yang

**Featured players**

- Ashley Padilla
- Emil Wakim
- Jane Wickline

bold denotes "Weekend Update" anchor

== Writers ==
Prior to the start of the season, Allie Levitan, Moss Perricone and Carl Tart joined the writing staff.

Writers Dan Bulla (who joined the writing staff in 2019) and Auguste White (who joined the writing staff in 2022) have been promoted to writing supervisors, joining current supervisors Celeste Yim and Will Stephen. Rosebud Baker (who joined the writing staff in 2022) is now named as a writer for Weekend Update.

Sudi Green (who was previously a writer on the show from 2015 to 2021) returned as a writer during the first-half of the season.

This was the final season for Yim, (who had been a writer since 2020), White, Baker and Please Don't Destroy's John Higgins, (who had been a writer since 2021). Long-term writer Steven Castillo, who previously wrote for the show from 2017 to 2021, before returning midway through season 49 in 2024, and overall wrote for seven non-consecutive seasons, would leave the show for the second time. He stated that his second run at SNL was never meant to be long-term and that he just wanted to be a part of the 50th season.

== Production ==
In late 2021, show creator and executive producer Lorne Michaels stated that he was committed to continuing with the series through the fiftieth season (at the time, the show was in its forty-seventh) and suggested that he may retire afterward. The subsequent year, Kenan Thompson speculated that the series may end if Michaels left, saying, "He's the one that's had his touch on the whole thing . . . It opens the opportunity for a lot of bullshit to come into the game because he's such a legend that he keeps off those corporate wolves." During season forty-nine, Michaels stated that 2000s-era member Tina Fey could be a capable successor, but insisted that he would finish the next season before any dramatic changes. He reiterated these plans in May, when a fiftieth anniversary special was announced that would celebrate the series' history on February 16, 2025. In an interview with The Hollywood Reporter before the season started, Michaels denied that he would be retiring at the end of the season. Prior to the season start on September 28, NBC began airing retrospectives on the show with their mid-year coverage of the 2024 Summer Olympics. Michaels had previously stated that he intended to bring back everyone from the previous decades, as well as hosts and musical guests who have helped shape the show, for the anniversary special.

On July 31, it was announced that Maya Rudolph would return to portray vice president and presidential nominee Kamala Harris through the 2024 election season. The next day, cast member Punkie Johnson announced that she would be leaving the show after four years. On August 2, cast member Molly Kearney announced their departure after two seasons as a featured player. On September 9, it was announced that Chloe Troast would also be departing after one season as a featured player. On the same day, it was announced that three new cast members would be hired as featured players: Ashley Padilla, Emil Wakim and Jane Wickline. Featured players Marcello Hernández, Michael Longfellow and Devon Walker, who joined the cast along with Kearney prior to season 48, were promoted to repertory status.

Coinciding with the fiftieth season, the biographical film Saturday Night, directed by Jason Reitman, was released in theaters by Columbia Pictures on October 11, 2024, after a limited theatrical release on September 27, depicting the story of the show's tumultuous premiere on NBC.

This was the final season for longtime carpenter Stephen "Demo" DeMaria, who retired at the end of the season, after 50 years, since the show's inception in 1975.

== Episodes ==
No. overall	No. in season	Host	Musical guest(s)	Original release date	U.S. viewers (millions)
969	1	Jean Smart	Jelly Roll	September 28, 2024	5.39
Jelly Roll performs "Liar" and "Winning Streak" and appears in the cut-for-time "Blonde Dragon People" sketch.; Hannah Einbinder, daughter of original Not Ready for Primetime Player Laraine Newman as well as Smart's co-star on Hacks, joins Smart in introducing Jelly Roll for the first song.; Maya Rudolph, Jim Gaffigan, Andy Samberg, and Dana Carvey appear as Kamala Harris, Tim Walz, Doug Emhoff, and Joe Biden, respectively, in the cold open.; Additionally, Samberg appears in the cut-for-time "Blonde Dragon People" sketch.; This episode marks the debut of a new arrangement of the theme song.; Smart sings "I Happen to Like New York" in her opening monologue.; Before the goodnights, a photo of Tom McCarthy, former senior vice president and global chief security officer for NBC, who died July 10, is shown in silence.; Ashley Padilla, Emil Wakim, and Jane Wickline’s first episode as cast members.; In versions distributed online and internationally, the "Textbook Writer" sketch is amended to include a shot from the dress rehearsal version, owing to a props error made by Smart in the live program.; According to NBC, this is the most-watched episode ever on Peacock, "through the first weekend".; Blake Lively was the original intended host of this premiere, but withdrew due to the It Ends with Us fallout.
970	2	Nate Bargatze	Coldplay	October 5, 2024	4.76
Coldplay performs "All My Love" and "We Pray".; Elyanna and Tini accompany Coldplay in the performance of "We Pray".; The performance of "We Pray" was excised from the episode's broadcast in the United Kingdom, but remains intact on streaming platforms.; Maya Rudolph, Andy Samberg, Jim Gaffigan, and Dana Carvey appear as Kamala Harris, Doug Emhoff, Tim Walz and Joe Biden in the cold open.; Rudolph and Samberg also appear in the SNL Digital Short, "Sushi Glory Hole".; Akiva Schaffer appears in the SNL Digital Short, "Sushi Glory Hole".; Before the goodnights, a photo of Kris Kristofferson, who hosted the season finale of the first season, and who died earlier in the week, is shown in silence.
971	3	Ariana Grande	Stevie Nicks	October 12, 2024	5.57
Stevie Nicks performs "The Lighthouse" and "Edge of Seventeen".; Maya Rudolph, Andy Samberg, Jim Gaffigan and Dana Carvey appear as Kamala Harris, Doug Emhoff, Tim Walz and Joe Biden in the cold open.; Rudolph and Samberg also appear in the "Castrati" sketch.; Carvey also appears in the "Maybelline" sketch.; Technical issues afflicted the latter portion of the show. A malfunctioning sound board caused Nicks' second song to be delayed - following another set of commercials - which resulted in one sketch ("Cinema Classics", with Grande due to portray Judy Garland) being dropped and replaced by another ("Hotel Detective", recorded - and initially cut - at dress-rehearsal) with a shorter runtime. Broadcast reruns in the show's late night slot added new bumper footage during the commercials of Stevie and her band getting ready on stage, removing the initial broadcast's extended use of a still photo of Nicks. It also added an ad break between the Maybelline skit and the final skit.; The episode's broadcast was also delayed by six minutes owing to NBC's coverage of Ohio State-Oregon on Big Ten Saturday Night.; Ashley Padilla was credited in the opening montage, but did not appear in the episode, although she appeared on stage during the goodnights.
972	4	Michael Keaton	Billie Eilish	October 19, 2024	4.77
Billie Eilish performs "Birds of a Feather" and "Wildflower", both with Finneas on acoustic guitar, and appears in the pre-recorded "TikTok" sketch.; Alec Baldwin, Maya Rudolph, and Dana Carvey appear as Bret Baier, Kamala Harris, and Joe Biden in the cold open.; Carvey and Rudolph also appear as Biden and Harris in the pre-recorded "TikTok" sketch.; Andy Samberg appears as Beetlejuice in the opening monologue.
973	5	John Mulaney	Chappell Roan	November 2, 2024	6.59
Chappell Roan performs "Pink Pony Club" and "The Giver".; The performance of "Pink Pony Club" was excised from the episode's broadcast in the United Kingdom, but remains intact on streaming platforms.; Maya Rudolph, Andy Samberg, Jim Gaffigan and Dana Carvey appear as Kamala Harris, Doug Emhoff, Tim Walz and Joe Biden, respectively, in the cold open. Harris additionally appears as herself alongside Rudolph's impression and says with Rudolph "Live from New York, it's Saturday Night!".; Samberg also appears in the "Port Authority Duane Reade" sketch.; Tim Kaine appears as himself in the "What's That Name?" sketch.; Pete Davidson appears in the "Port Authority Duane Reade" sketch.; Before the goodnights, a photo of Teri Garr, who hosted three times in the 1980s, and who died earlier in the week, is shown in silence.; Several NBC affiliates filed equal time notices with the FCC due to appearances by Harris and Kaine invoking the equal-time rule.
974	6	Bill Burr	Mk.gee	November 9, 2024	4.42
Mk.gee performs "Rockman" and "Alesis".; Dana Carvey appears as Elon Musk in the cold open.; SNL writer Will Stephen appears in the "Snakeskin" sketch as a drummer.; In versions distributed online and internationally, the "Trauma Support Group" sketch is replaced by a longer version recorded at dress rehearsal.; Before the goodnights, a photo of Quincy Jones, who hosted the twelfth episode of the fifteenth season, and who died earlier in the week, is shown in silence.; Chloe Fineman was credited in the opening montage, but did not appear in the episode, although she appeared on stage during the goodnights.
975	7	Charli XCX	Charli XCX	November 16, 2024	4.29
Charli XCX performs "360" and "Sympathy Is a Knife".; Julia Fox introduces Charli XCX's first performance, with Bowen Yang introducing the second.; Both performances were excised from the episode's broadcast in the United Kingdom, but remain intact in the version available via streaming.; Dana Carvey and Alec Baldwin appear in the cold open as Joe Biden and Robert F. Kennedy Jr., respectively.; Carvey also appears as Al Pacino in the pre-recorded "Wicked Auditions" sketch.; Kyle Mooney appears in the opening monologue and the "Thanksgiving Baking Championship 2024" sketch.; Andy Samberg appears in the SNL Digital Short, "Here I Go"; and during the goodnights.; Akiva Schaffer also cameos in the Digital Short.; Punkie Johnson appears during the goodnights.; Mikey Day was credited in the opening montage, but did not appear in the episode, although he appeared on stage during the goodnights.
976	8	Paul Mescal	Shaboozey	December 7, 2024	3.84
Shaboozey performs "Good News" and "A Bar Song (Tipsy)".; Dana Carvey and David Spade appear as The Church Lady and Hunter Biden, respectively, in the Church Chat cold open.; Writer Carl Tart appears in the "Brilliant Lawyer" sketch.; Trisha Paytas appears in the "Spotify Wrapped" sketch.
977	9	Chris Rock	Gracie Abrams	December 14, 2024	4.22
Gracie Abrams performs "That's So True" and "I Love You, I'm Sorry".; Adam Sandler appears in the "Gallbladder Surgery" sketch.
978	10	Martin Short	Hozier	December 21, 2024	4.79
Hozier performs "Too Sweet" and "Fairytale of New York".; Tom Hanks, Paul Rudd, Tina Fey, Alec Baldwin, Scarlett Johansson, Kristen Wiig, Melissa McCarthy, Emma Stone, John Mulaney and Jimmy Fallon appear in the cold open to induct Short into the Five-Timers Club.; Fallon, Stone and Wiig also appear in the opening monologue.; McCarthy also appears in the "Parking Lot Altercation" sketch.; Wiig, Rudd, McCarthy, and Hanks (reprising his role as Sully Sullenberger from Sully) also appear in the "Airport Parade" sketch.; Johansson appears during Weekend Update backstage.; Rudd also appears in the "Sábado Gigante" sketch.; Lorne Michaels appears in the opening monologue.; Dana Carvey appears in the "Sábado Gigante" sketch.; Lucy Liu appears in the cut-for-time pre-recorded "How the Grinch Stole Christmas" sketch.; With this episode, Short becomes the first Canadian-American and the first Dick Ebersol-era cast member to join the Five-Timers Club.
979	11	Dave Chappelle	GloRilla	January 18, 2025	4.85
GloRilla performs "Yeah Glo!" and a medley of "Whatchu Kno About Me" and "Let Her Cook" and appears in the pre-recorded "Pop the Balloon” sketch.; Neither performance was broadcast in the United Kingdom, with GloRilla's musical guest credit excised from the opening sequence. Such edits were not made to the version of the episode available on streaming.; Chappelle broke his own record for longest monologue in the show's history. His previous record, set when he hosted the show in November 2020, was a monologue of 16 minutes and 9 seconds. The monologue in this episode was "just short of 17 minutes". With Chappelle's monologue being longer than planned (the dress rehearsal monologue reportedly lasted only "nine minutes"), multiple sketches were cut from the live show.; Donnell Rawlings appears in the pre-recorded "Pop the Balloon" sketch.; Before the goodnights, a photo of filmmaker David Lynch, who died two days prior to this episode, is shown in silence.; Emil Wakim was credited in the opening montage, but did not appear in the episode, although he appeared on stage during the goodnights.
980	12	Timothée Chalamet	Timothée Chalamet	January 25, 2025	4.96
Timothée Chalamet, with James Blake, performs a medley of "Outlaw Blues" and "Three Angels" for his first set and "Tomorrow Is a Long Time" for his second set.; Adam Sandler introduces Chalamet's first performance with Kenan Thompson introducing the second performance.; Chalamet's performance of "Outlaw Blues" was excised from broadcast in the United Kingdom.; Chalamet is the first non-musician host to also serve as musical guest since actor Gary Busey in 1979. (Note: Both Chalamet and Busey were also nominated for an Academy Award for portraying a musician in a biopic (Chalamet for portraying Bob Dylan in A Complete Unknown, and Busey for portraying Buddy Holly in The Buddy Holly Story).); Lin-Manuel Miranda appears in the cold open, reprising his role as Alexander Hamilton from the musical Hamilton.; Writer Moss Perricone appears in the opening monologue.; During the goodnights, Chalamet wishes his sister Pauline, who turned 33 the same night as the episode, a happy birthday.; According to Nielsen and internal NBCU data, this episode is the third-most watched Peacock livestream on record, also obtaining 300 million viewers across all social platforms.
981	13	Shane Gillis	Tate McRae	March 1, 2025	4.28
Tate McRae performs "Sports Car" and "Dear God" and appears in the pre-recorded "Please Don't Destroy - The Sound" sketch.; Neither performance was broadcast in the United Kingdom, but were included in the version of the episode available on-demand.; Mike Myers appears in the cold open as Elon Musk.; Before the goodnights, a still photo of David Johansen, in character as "Buster Poindexter", who died the previous day, is shown in silence.; Despite being credited in the opening montage, Chloe Fineman was absent from this episode due to contracting COVID-19 days before the episode was due to air.; Michael Longfellow was credited in the opening montage, but did not appear in the episode, although he appeared on stage during the goodnights.
982	14	Lady Gaga	Lady Gaga	March 8, 2025	4.63
Lady Gaga performs "Abracadabra" and "Killah".; In the latter song, the word "shit" appears in one line of the lyrics. The word is on the list of the “seven dirty words” prohibited from being broadcast. It was not censored for the East Coast, but in the version of the episode distributed online and internationally the sound drops out solely for the word, while in the West Coast broadcast it dropped out less precisely and briefly censored some surrounding vocals. (Note: In the Eastern and Central Time Zones, Saturday Night Live airs within the FCC’s “safe harbor” period, which permits indecent material to air between 10:00 p.m. and 6:00 a.m. local time.); Bowen Yang introduces Gaga's first performance while wearing a shirt advertising her newest album, Mayhem.; Ego Nwodim, Sarah Sherman, and Kenan Thompson introduce Gaga’s second performance.; Mike Myers appears as Elon Musk in the cold open.; Two sketches of this episode were affected by props errors in the live broadcast. Small sections of "Birthday at Friendly's" were replaced with the dress rehearsal version on Peacock and YouTube, while a prop error in "A Long Goodbye" was not rectified upon post-broadcast distribution.
983	15	Mikey Madison	Morgan Wallen	March 29, 2025	4.27
Morgan Wallen performs "I'm the Problem" and "Just in Case".; Madison's twin brother Miles appears in the opening monologue.; Joe Jonas appears in the pre-recorded "Big Dumb Line" sketch. The role was originally intended for Wallen, but he turned it down.; Writer Carl Tart appears in the "Jury Duty" sketch.; Wallen immediately walked off the stage during the goodnights, leading to him being derided online for breaking tradition. The incident was mocked in the following episode by both James Austin Johnson (during his portrayal of Trump in the cold open) as well as by Colin Jost in the Weekend Update segment. (Note: Johnson did not directly mock Wallen's abrupt departure, but rather what Wallen uploaded to his social media following the abrupt departure.)
984	16	Jack Black	Elton John & Brandi Carlile	April 5, 2025	4.53
Elton John & Brandi Carlile, with Chad Smith on drums, Andrew Watt on guitar and Josh Klinghoffer on keyboards perform "Little Richard's Bible" and "Who Believes in Angels?"; Carlile also appears in the "Making Love" sketch.; Mike Myers appears as Elon Musk in the cold open.; Madonna, Bill Burr, Kieran Culkin (along with his wife Jazz Charton), Questlove, Joe Miñoso, Black’s son Sam, and Black's School of Rock co-stars can be seen in the audience during the opening monologue.; During the Weekend Update segment in which Ego Nwodim (in her stand-up persona "Miss Eggy") performs a mock stand-up routine audition for the White House Correspondents' Dinner, the audience responded in unison to a call and response-style joke with the word "shit," to the surprise of Nwodim, Colin Jost and Michael Che on-stage. The word was heard on the live East Coast and Peacock broadcasts, but censored for the West Coast, international airings, and online clips. The incident was mocked in the following episode's cold open by James Austin Johnson as Trump and by Bowen Yang as Chen Biao on Update, as well as in the season finale where Nwodim's stand-up persona returns and Jost claims that earned an FCC fine on Update.; Before the goodnights, a photo of Val Kilmer, who died earlier in the week, is shown in silence.
985	17	Jon Hamm	Lizzo	April 12, 2025	4.29
Lizzo performs a medley of "Love in Real Life" and "Still Bad" for her first set and "Don't Make Me Love You" for her second set and appears in the pre-recorded "The White POTUS" sketch and the "New Parents" sketch.; Kieran Culkin appears in the opening monologue.; Beck Bennett, Jon Gries, Scarlett Johansson, and Alex Moffat appear as Vladimir Putin, Howard Lutnick, Ivanka Trump, and Eric Trump in the pre-recorded "The White POTUS" sketch.; A scene in "The White POTUS" where Sarah Sherman portrays Aimee Lou Wood's character from The White Lotus attracted controversy, for being seen to disparage Wood's appearance. There were conflicting reports as to whether the program apologized to her for the portrayal.
986	18	Quinta Brunson	Benson Boone	May 3, 2025	4.37
Benson Boone performs "Sorry I'm Here for Someone Else" and "Mystical Magical" and appears on Weekend Update.; Sabrina Carpenter and Dwyane Wade appear in the opening monologue.
987	19	Walton Goggins	Arcade Fire	May 10, 2025	4.22
Arcade Fire performs "Pink Elephant" and "Year of the Snake".; The mothers of Kenan Thompson, Bowen Yang and Marcello Hernandez appear in the cold open. Additionally, Cecily Strong appears as Jeanine Pirro.; Goggins' mother, Janet Long, appears in the opening monologue.; Sam Rockwell appears in the pre-recorded "Tiny Baby Shoe" sketch.; Chloe Fineman and Devon Walker were credited in the opening montage, but did not appear in the episode, although both appeared on stage during the goodnights.
988	20	Scarlett Johansson	Bad Bunny	May 17, 2025	4.87
Bad Bunny performs "Nuevayol" and "Perfumito Nuevo" with RaiNao and appears in the pre-recorded "Please Don't Destroy: First Class" sketch and the "Couples at the Bar" sketch.; For "Nuevayol", Bad Bunny recreates the "Lunch atop a Skyscraper" photograph.; Gina Gershon and Emily Ratajkowski appear in the pre-recorded "Bowen's Still Straight" sketch.; Mike Myers appears in the "Mike Myers Elevator Ride" sketch.; With this episode, Johansson becomes SNL's most frequent female host, breaking the tie she previously held with Drew Barrymore and Tina Fey.; Final episode to feature a pre-recorded sketch by Please Don't Destroy, as writer and member John Higgins would leave the show after this season. As a result, this also the final episode to feature the "A Film by Please Don't Destroy" credit in the opening montage.; Heidi Gardner, Michael Longfellow, Ego Nwodim, Emil Wakim, and Devon Walker's final episode as cast members.

== Specials ==
Title	Original release date	U.S. viewers (millions)
"The 2024 SNL Election Special"	November 4, 2024	3.06
Highlights of Saturday Night Live's 2024 election coverage.
"A Saturday Night Live Thanksgiving"	November 27, 2024	2.63
A two-hour highlights collection of SNL’s Thanksgiving-themed sketches.
"A Saturday Night Live Christmas"	December 18, 2024	2.79
A two-hour highlights collection of SNL’s holiday-themed sketches.
"SNL50: Beyond Saturday Night"	January 16, 2025	N/A
A four-part documentary series focusing on the behind the scenes history of the show, including a deep dive into the "More Cowbell" sketch from season 25 and the show's low-rated, critically-despised, but pivotal 11th season which saw the return of Lorne Michaels after his primetime sketch series The New Show flopped.
"Ladies & Gentlemen... 50 Years of SNL Music"	January 27, 2025	3.47
A documentary by Questlove focusing on the musical guests, musical sketches and musical controversies of the series.
"SNL50: The Homecoming Concert"	February 14, 2025	N/A
A special concert livestreamed from Radio City Music Hall on Peacock. Musical guests included Arcade Fire, the B-52s, Backstreet Boys, Bad Bunny, Cher, David Byrne, Brandi Carlile, Miley Cyrus, DEVO, Brittany Howard, Jelly Roll, Lady Gaga, Lauryn Hill, Chris Martin, Mumford & Sons, Nirvana, Post Malone, Preservation Hall Jazz Band, Bonnie Raitt, Robyn, the Roots, St. Vincent, Eddie Vedder, and Jack White.
"Saturday Night Live 50th Anniversary Special"	February 16, 2025	13.92
A three hour prime-time special celebrating SNL's 50th season. This special assembled together a large list of current and former cast members, hosts, and musical acts from throughout the show's fifty seasons.

== Ratings ==
Through the seventh episode, this season of Saturday Night Live was the "highest rated entertainment program across ad-supported broadcast and cable TV among viewers aged 18-49", and—-with seven days of on-demand viewing included—-the season so far averaged a 1.28 demo rating, and an average viewership of 7.3 million.

Viewership and ratings per episode of Saturday Night Live season 50
No.	Title	Air date	Rating (18–49)	Viewers (millions)	Ref.
1	"Jean Smart / Jelly Roll"	September 28, 2024	0.84	5.388	
2	"Nate Bargatze / Coldplay"	October 5, 2024	0.73	4.762	
3	"Ariana Grande / Stevie Nicks"	October 12, 2024	0.94	5.572	
4	"Michael Keaton / Billie Eilish"	October 19, 2024	0.71	4.777	
5	"John Mulaney / Chappell Roan"	November 2, 2024	1.24	6.586	
6	"Bill Burr / Mk.gee"	November 9, 2024	0.72	4.424	
7	"Charli XCX"	November 16, 2024	0.64	4.286	
8	"Paul Mescal / Shaboozey"	December 7, 2024	0.55	3.839	
9	"Chris Rock / Gracie Abrams"	December 14, 2024	0.61	4.200	
10	"Martin Short / Hozier"	December 21, 2024	0.70	4.793	
11	"Dave Chappelle / GloRilla"	January 18, 2025	0.76	4.848	
12	"Timothée Chalamet"	January 25, 2025	0.77	4.958	
13	"Shane Gillis / Tate McRae"	March 1, 2025	0.67	4.275	
14	"Lady Gaga"	March 8, 2025	0.60	4.625	
15	"Mikey Madison / Morgan Wallen"	March 29, 2025	0.52	4.268	
16	"Jack Black / Elton John & Brandi Carlile"	April 5, 2025	0.59	4.525	
17	"Jon Hamm / Lizzo"	April 12, 2025	0.58	4.293	
18	"Quinta Brunson / Benson Boone"	May 3, 2025	0.56	4.369	
19	"Walton Goggins / Arcade Fire"	May 10, 2025	0.62	4.215	
20	"Scarlett Johansson / Bad Bunny"	May 17, 2025	0.66	4.874	

=== Specials ===
Viewership and ratings per episode of Saturday Night Live season 50
No.	Title	Air date	Rating (18–49)	Viewers (millions)	DVR (18–49)	DVR viewers (millions)	Total (18–49)	Total viewers (millions)	Ref.
1	"The 2024 SNL Election Special"	November 4, 2024	0.34	3.060	0.05	0.679	0.39	3.739	
2	"A Saturday Night Live Thanksgiving"	November 27, 2024	0.43	2.634	0.04	0.314	0.47	2.948	
3	"A Saturday Night Live Christmas"	December 18, 2024	0.33	2.785	0.09	0.656	0.42	3.441	
4	"Ladies & Gentlemen... 50 Years of SNL Music"	January 27, 2025	0.42	3.474	0.05	0.516	0.47	4.002	
5	"Saturday Night Live 50th Anniversary Special"	February 16, 2025	2.17	13.921	0.43	2.573	2.59	16.495	
