= Saturday Night Live 50th Anniversary Special =

2025 American television special

- Saturday Night Live episode
- Directed by: Liz Patrick
- Written by: James Anderson; Dan Bulla; Megan Callahan-Shah; Michael Che; Mikey Day; Mike DiCenzo; Jim Downey; Tina Fey; Jimmy Fowlie; Alison Gates; Sudi Green; Jack Handey; Steve Higgins; Colin Jost; Erik Kenward; Dennis McNicholas; Seth Meyers; Lorne Michaels; John Mulaney; Jake Nordwind; Ceara O'Sullivan; Josh Patten; Paula Pell; Simon Rich; Pete Schultz; Streeter Seidell; Emily Spivey; Kent Sublette; Bryan H. Tucker; Auguste White
- Narrated by: Darrell Hammond
- Original air date: February 16, 2025
- Running time: 209 minutes (with commercials); 152 minutes (without commercials)

"Saturday Night Live 50th Anniversary Special" (also billed as "SNL50: The Anniversary Special") is a three-hour television special to commemorate the 50th anniversary season of Saturday Night Live. It aired on February 16, 2025, on NBC and Peacock. The special was watched by nearly 15 million viewers.

== Synopsis ==
The special followed the format of a typical Saturday Night Live episode, extended to 3½ hours instead of the usual 1½, and included a cold open, a monologue, sketches, a short film, commercial parodies, and musical performances.

=== Sketches ===
Sketch	Notes
Opening Monologue	Steve Martin hosts with featured cameos from John Mulaney and Martin Short, with David Letterman appearing in the audience. Mikey Day and Devon Walker appear as ICE agents escorting Short off the stage.
The Lawrence Welk Show & The Maharelle Sisters	Fred Armisen as Lawrence Welk, Will Ferrell as Robert Goulet, Kristen Wiig as Dooneese, Ana Gasteyer as Margaret, Kim Kardashian as Holly, and Scarlett Johansson as Janice. Kenan Thompson briefly appears as Florian Trent, a body contortionist.
Black Jeopardy!	Kenan Thompson reprises his role as Black Jeopardy! host Darnell Hayes with Leslie Jones as Shanice, Tracy Morgan as Darius, Eddie Murphy as Tracy Morgan, Chris Rock as a Special Guest Clue, and Tom Hanks reprising his role as Doug.
Physical Comedy clip montage	Emma Stone and Molly Shannon as Sally O'Malley present a montage dedicated to physical comedy on SNL.
Domingo: Vow Renewal	Martin Short and Molly Shannon as parents of the bride, Chloe Fineman and Andrew Dismukes as the couple, Sabrina Carpenter, Heidi Gardner, Sarah Sherman, and Ego Nwodim as bridesmaids, Andy Samberg, Bowen Yang, Beck Bennett, Kyle Mooney as the Groomsmen, Marcello Hernández as Domingo, Pedro Pascal as Renaldo, and Bad Bunny as Santiago.
Deep Thoughts by Jack Handey	Handey's voice reminisces about 50 years of SNL, but values his salary above anything.
Q&A Segment	Tina Fey and Amy Poehler answer questions from audience members Quinta Brunson, Tim Meadows, Ryan Reynolds, Nate Bargatze, Donna Richards (host dresser), Jon Lovitz, Julia Louis-Dreyfus, Adam Driver, Cher, Keith Richards, Zach Galifianakis, Jon Hamm, Bad Bunny, Seth Meyers, Al Sharpton, Ray Romano, Jason Momoa, Fred Armisen, and Peyton Manning.
SNL Digital Short	Bowen Yang, Andy Samberg, Sarah Sherman, Chris Parnell, Ana Gasteyer, Molly Shannon, Will Forte, Taran Killam, James Austin Johnson, Kenan Thompson, Beck Bennett and Kyle Mooney appear in a musical pre-taped digital short about anxiety at SNL.
Weekend Update	Colin Jost and Michael Che host Weekend Update. Che pays tribute to both Norm Macdonald and O. J. Simpson. (Note: Che explains that Norm Macdonald lost his job due to too many jokes about O.J. Simpson and then facetiously salutes Simpson.) Cecily Strong plays The Girl You Wish You Hadn't Started a Conversation with at a Party alongside Bobby Moynihan as Drunk Uncle. Seth Meyers introduces "Lorne's Best Friends from Growing Up" (Vanessa Bayer, Fred Armisen). Bill Murray ranks his favorite Weekend Update anchors. He makes a callback to earlier material in the sketch by ranking Norm Macdonald a favorite anchor and referring to his jokes about O.J. Simpson.
"Close Encounters" sketch	Aidy Bryant and Jon Hamm play officials investigating an alien abduction. Kate McKinnon reprises her role as Colleen Rafferty with Pedro Pascal and Woody Harrelson playing other abductees and Meryl Streep playing Colleen Sr., Rafferty's mother.
"The Stagehand" pre-taped sketch	Laraine Newman reminiscences being around Studio 8H and meets Chad (Pete Davidson). Cameo from Mikey Day.
"Moving to New York" musical sketch	Musical sketch featuring John Mulaney as Big Nick, Pete Davidson, David Spade, Adam Driver, Maya Rudolph, Emil Wakim, Alex Moffat, Paul Shaffer, G. E. Smith, Nathan Lane, Chloe Fineman, Jason Sudeikis, Will Forte, Kristen Wiig, Beck Bennett, Kyle Mooney, Scarlett Johansson, Paul Rudd, James Austin Johnson, Kenan Thompson, Cecily Strong, Nick Jonas, Taran Killam, and Ana Gasteyer with Kate McKinnon reprising her role as Rudy Giuliani, Lin-Manuel Miranda reprising his role as Alexander Hamilton, Sarah Sherman as Michael Bloomberg, and Devon Walker as Eric Adams. Audience members Jenna Ortega and Kevin Costner also take part, perhaps unintentionally, sitting between two of the singers. Natasha Lyonne played the role of a Guardian Angel in the final scene, but was obscured by Driver’s hot dog costume and not visible on camera.
Commercial parody clip montage	Alec Baldwin introduces a montage of commercial parodies (with Sarah Sherman).
"Bronx Beat with Betty & Jodi" Sketch	Amy Poehler and Maya Rudolph as Betty and Jodi with Miles Teller and Mike Myers who reprises his role as Linda Richman.
In Memoriam to cancelled sketches	Tom Hanks presents an In Memoriam to cancelled characters, stereotypes, jokes in poor taste, or "sketches that have aged horribly."
"Debbie Downer" sketch	Jimmy Fallon, Ayo Edebiri, Drew Barrymore, and Robert De Niro appear with Rachel Dratch reprising her role as Debbie Downer working as a bartender.
"Scared Straight" sketch	Sketch featuring Eddie Murphy, Kenan Thompson reprising his role as Lorenzo McIntosh, Will Ferrell, Jason Sudeikis reprising his role as Officer Sikorski, Mikey Day, Michael Longfellow, and Marcello Hernández.
"Don't Look Back in Anger" short	Garrett Morris introduces the Schiller's Reel short "Don't Look Back in Anger" starring John Belushi.
SNL goodnights	Martin Short salutes the original cast and thanks Lorne Michaels on-stage as they began the famous SNL goodnights.

=== Musical performances ===
Presenter	Musicians	Notes
The cold open	Paul Simon and Sabrina Carpenter	"Homeward Bound" (Note: previously performed by Simon and George Harrison on the November 20, 1976 episode)
Aubrey Plaza	Miley Cyrus and Brittany Howard	"Nothing Compares 2 U"
Jack Nicholson	Adam Sandler	"50 Years", a tribute song to SNL written by Sandler
Dave Chappelle	Lil Wayne and The Roots	Medley of "Uproar", "Lollipop", "6 Foot 7 Foot", "Mrs. Officer", and "A Milli"
Martin Short	Paul McCartney	"Golden Slumbers"/"Carry That Weight"/"The End"

== Cast and crew ==
=== Appearances ===
The initial headliners for the 50th anniversary special were announced on February 6, 2025, 10 days before the broadcast. Several more headliners were spoiled, in a picture The New York Times used, during an interview with executive producer Lorne Michaels. On February 14, it was confirmed that cast alumni Dan Aykroyd and Bill Hader would not be present at the event; Aykroyd preferred to watch the event at home with his children, while Hader declined the invitation due to a schedule conflict. Aykroyd later gave his blessing to the special, stating in a social media post that he "smile(d) from start to finish" watching from home. Other alumni who were absent included Dana Carvey (who was suffering from a severe case of influenza), Colin Quinn (who had an engagement booked in North Carolina that night), Dennis Miller and Dick Ebersol. Former notable hosts Elliott Gould, John Goodman, Jim Carrey, Louis C.K., Justin Timberlake, Danny DeVito, Melissa McCarthy, Ariana Grande, Dwayne Johnson, Charles Barkley, Jonah Hill, Candice Bergen, Ben Affleck and Christopher Walken were also absent.

- Fred Armisen
- Alec Baldwin
- Nate Bargatze
- Drew Barrymore
- Vanessa Bayer
- Beck Bennett
- Quinta Brunson
- Aidy Bryant
- Dan Bulla
- Bad Bunny
- Sabrina Carpenter
- Dave Chappelle
- Michael Che
- Cher
- Miley Cyrus
- Pete Davidson
- Mikey Day
- Robert De Niro
- Andrew Dismukes
- Rachel Dratch
- Adam Driver
- Ayo Edebiri
- Jimmy Fallon
- Wally Feresten
- Will Ferrell
- Tina Fey
- Chloe Fineman
- Will Forte
- Zach Galifianakis
- Heidi Gardner
- Ana Gasteyer
- Jon Hamm
- Tom Hanks
- Woody Harrelson
- Marcello Hernández
- Brittany Howard
- Scarlett Johansson
- James Austin Johnson
- Nick Jonas
- Leslie Jones
- Colin Jost
- Kim Kardashian
- Taran Killam
- Nathan Lane
- Julia Louis-Dreyfus
- Michael Longfellow
- Jon Lovitz
- Natasha Lyonne
- Lil Wayne
- Peyton Manning
- Steve Martin
- Paul McCartney
- Kate McKinnon
- Tim Meadows
- Seth Meyers
- Lin-Manuel Miranda
- Alex Moffat
- Jason Momoa
- Kyle Mooney
- Garrett Morris
- Tracy Morgan
- Bobby Moynihan
- John Mulaney
- Eddie Murphy
- Bill Murray
- Mike Myers
- Laraine Newman
- Jack Nicholson
- Ego Nwodim
- Ashley Padilla
- Chris Parnell
- Pedro Pascal
- Aubrey Plaza
- Amy Poehler
- Ryan Reynolds
- Donna Richards
- Keith Richards
- Chris Rock
- Ray Romano
- The Roots
- Gena Rositano
- Paul Rudd
- Maya Rudolph
- Andy Samberg
- Adam Sandler
- Akiva Schaffer
- Paul Shaffer
- Molly Shannon
- Al Sharpton
- Sarah Sherman
- Martin Short
- Paul Simon
- G. E. Smith
- David Spade
- Meryl Streep
- Emma Stone
- Cecily Strong
- Jason Sudeikis
- Jorma Taccone
- Miles Teller
- Kenan Thompson
- Emil Wakim
- Devon Walker
- Jane Wickline
- Kristen Wiig
- Bowen Yang

=== Writers ===
Several past writers for the show returned to become "staff writers" for the special, including Tina Fey, Seth Meyers, Paula Pell, Emily Spivey, and John Mulaney.

== Audience members ==
Also in attendance were numerous actors, musicians, comedians, media figures, and celebrities, many of whom had appeared on or hosted SNL in the past, with some seen prominently during some sketches. Confirmed as attending (some with partner/spouse) were:

- J. J. Abrams
- Adria Arjona
- Aziz Ansari
- Awkwafina
- Judd Apatow
- Kevin Bacon
- Hilaria Baldwin
- Lake Bell
- Jim Belushi
- Jim Breuer
- Matthew Broderick
- Bill Burr
- Steve Buscemi
- David Byrne
- Brandi Carlile
- Steve Carell
- Chevy Chase
- Ellen Cleghorne
- Sacha Baron Cohen
- Stephen Colbert
- Kevin Costner
- Billy Crystal
- Jane Curtin
- Tish Cyrus
- Claire Danes
- Larry David
- Laura Dern
- Zooey Deschanel
- Denny Dillon
- Amelia Dimoldenberg
- Peter Dinklage
- Robin Duke
- Nora Dunn
- Alexander 'A.E' Edwards
- Dean Edwards
- Abby Elliott
- Ari Emanuel
- Paul Feig
- Arcade Fire
- Chris Fischer
- Al Franken
- James Franco
- Jim Gaffigan
- Lady Gaga
- Whoopi Goldberg
- Grace Gummer
- Anthony Michael Hall
- Brad Hall
- Halsey
- Darrell Hammond
- David Harbour
- Jack Harlow
- Marielle Heller
- Ed Helms
- Siobhan Fallon Hogan
- Melanie Hutsell
- Victoria Jackson
- Olivia Jean
- Dakota Johnson
- Nancy Juvonen
- Anya Taylor-Joy
- Chris Kattan
- Tim Kazurinsky
- Caroline Kennedy
- Anthony Kiedis
- David Koechner
- Gary Kroeger
- Donna Langley
- David Letterman
- Dan Levy
- Riki Lindhome
- Lucy Liu
- Blake Lively
- Natasha Lyonne
- Chris Martin
- Gail Matthius
- John McEnroe
- Malcolm McRae
- Camryn Manheim
- Dennis Miller
- Finesse Mitchell
- Jay Mohr
- Marcus Mumford
- Olivia Munn
- Kevin Nealon
- Joanna Newsom
- Don Novello
- Conan O'Brien
- Mike O'Brien
- Bob Odenkirk
- Catherine O'Hara
- Sandra Oh
- Jenna Ortega
- Guy Oseary
- Cheri Oteri
- Ashley Padilla
- Keke Palmer
- Sarah Jessica Parker
- Jay Pharoah
- Nasim Pedrad
- Paula Pell
- Chris Pine
- Joe Piscopo
- Questlove
- Bonnie Raitt
- Judge Reinhold
- Jeff Richards
- Rob Riggle
- Tim Robinson
- Robyn
- Mark Ronson
- Seth Rogen
- Lauren Miller Rogen
- Jonathan Roumie
- Susan Saint James
- Horatio Sanz
- Diane Sawyer
- Rob Schneider
- Amy Schumer
- Liev Schreiber
- Jonathan Scott
- Kyra Sedgwick
- Jerry Seinfeld
- Jessica Seinfeld
- Mike Shoemaker
- Sarah Silverman
- Robert Smigel
- J. B. Smoove
- Steven Spielberg
- Harper Steele
- Ben Stiller
- St. Vincent
- Julia Stiles
- Julia Sweeney
- Terry Sweeney
- Jorma Taccone
- Christine Taylor
- Tyga
- Eddie Vedder
- Melissa Villaseñor
- Jack White
- Casey Wilson
- Rita Wilson
- Susan Yeagley
- Ramy Youssef
- Sasheer Zamata
- Alan Zweibel

Note: former cast members Patrick Weathers and John Milhiser attended the Friday anniversary concert but not the Sunday live show.

== Preceding specials ==
Before the main event, NBC aired three other specials: SNL50: Beyond Saturday Night, a four-part documentary debuting on Peacock on January 16; Ladies & Gentlemen... 50 Years of SNL Music airing on NBC on January 27; and SNL50: The Homecoming Concert on February 14 live on Peacock. NBC also aired the first episode of the show the night before the anniversary special. The main special was preceded by a one-hour "red carpet special" featuring interviews with celebrities and past and current cast members (including many participating in that night's show). and, like the 40th Anniversary Special, was preceded by two hour-long live red carpet specials: one was hosted by Amelia Dimoldenberg for SNL's social media such as YouTube; Willie Geist, Leslie Jones, and Matt Rogers hosted the pre-show on NBC. However, the carpet at the 50th anniversary started only one hour before the show began at 7 p.m. before the 8 to 11:30 p.m. show.

== Reception ==
On the review aggregator website Rotten Tomatoes, 71% of 17 critics' reviews are positive, with an average rating of 6.3/10. Metacritic, which uses a weighted average, assigned the episode a score of 66 out of 100, based on 8 critics, indicating "generally favorable" reviews.

Joe Berkowitz of Vulture wrote, "SNL50 had three jobs: capture the significance of the milestone, pay respect to those who made it possible, and be funny. It handily managed all three, often at once." At Entertainment Weekly, Andy Hoglund critiqued the show's cozy relationship with corporate "brand synergy" - as well as its "hypocritical" tribute to Sinéad O'Connor - while recognizing its effective use of lore and returning cast members, particularly Eddie Murphy.

=== Accolades ===
Year	Award	Category	Nominee(s)	Result	Ref.
2025	Art Directors Guild Awards	Excellence in Production Design for a Variety Special	Production Designers of SNL50 (Note: Akira Yoshimura, N. Joseph DeTullio, Keith Ian Raywood, Melissa Shakun, Patrick Lynch, Sabrina Lederer, Charlotte Harrison, Diana Shaller, and Tara Donnelly)	Won	
2025	Astra TV Awards	Best Variety Series or Special	Saturday Night Live 50th Anniversary Special	Nominated	
2025	Astra Creative Arts Awards	Best Original Song	"Adam Sandler's Song: 50 Years"	Won	
2025	Costume Designers Guild Awards	Excellence in Variety, Reality-Competition or Live Television	Tom Broecker, Christina Natividad, and Ashley Dudek	Won	
2025	Critics' Choice Television Awards	Best Comedy Special	Saturday Night Live 50th Anniversary Special	Won	
2025	Directors Guild of America Awards	Outstanding Directing – Variety	Liz Patrick	Won	
2025	Make-Up Artists & Hair Stylists Guild Awards	Best Period and/or Character Hair Styling in a Television Special, One Hour or More Live Program Series	Hairstylists of SNL50 (Note: Jodi Mancuso, Cara Hannah, Amanda Duffy Evans, Gina Ferrucci, and Brittany Hartman)	Won	
2025	Primetime Emmy Awards	Outstanding Variety Special (Live)	Producers of SNL50 (Note: Lorne Michaels, Javier Winnik, Erin Doyle, Tom Broecker, Caroline Maroney, Colin Jost, Michael Che, Steve Higgins, and Erik Kenward)	Won	
2025	Primetime Creative Arts Emmy Awards	Outstanding Directing for a Variety Special	Liz Patrick	Won	
2025	Primetime Creative Arts Emmy Awards	Outstanding Writing for a Variety Special	Writers of SNL50 (Note: James Anderson, Dan Bulla, Megan Callahan-Shah, Michael Che, Mikey Day, Mike DiCenzo, James Downey, Tina Fey, Jimmy Fowlie, Alison Gates, Sudi Green, Jack Handey, Steve Higgins, Colin Jost, Erik Kenward, Dennis McNicholas, Seth Meyers, Lorne Michaels, John Mulaney, Jake Nordwind, Ceara O'Sullivan, Josh Patten, Paula Pell, Simon Rich, Pete Schultz, Streeter Seidell, Emily Spivey, Kent Sublette, Bryan H. Tucker, and Auguste White)	Won	
2025	Primetime Creative Arts Emmy Awards	Outstanding Hairstyling for a Variety, Nonfiction or Reality Program	Hairstylists of SNL50 (Note: Jodi Mancuso, Cara Hannah, Inga Thrasher, Amanda Duffy Evans, Chad Harlow, Gina Ferrucci, Brittany Hartman, and Katie Beatty)	Won	
2025	Primetime Creative Arts Emmy Awards	Outstanding Lighting Design / Lighting Direction for a Variety Special	Lighting technicians of SNL50 (Note: Geoffrey Amoral, Rick McGuinness, William McGuinness, Trevor Brown, Tim Stasse, Frank Grisanti, and Reginald Campbell)	Nominated	
2025	Primetime Creative Arts Emmy Awards	Outstanding Makeup for a Variety, Nonfiction or Reality Program	Makeup artists for SNL50 (Note: Louie Zakarian, Jason Milani, Amy Tagliamonti, Rachel Pagani, Young Bek, Stephen Kelley, and Joanna Pisani)	Won	
2025	Primetime Creative Arts Emmy Awards	Outstanding Music Direction	Lenny Pickett, Leon Pendarvis, and Eli Brueggemann	Nominated	
2025	Primetime Creative Arts Emmy Awards	Outstanding Original Music and Lyrics	"50 Years" – Adam Sandler and Dan Bulla	Nominated	
2025	Primetime Creative Arts Emmy Awards	Outstanding Picture Editing for Variety Programming (Segment)	Editors of SNL50 (Note: "Physical Comedy" – Ryan Spears, Paul Del Gesso, Christopher Salerno, Daniel Garcia, Sean McIlraith, and Ryan McIlraith)	Won	
2025	Primetime Creative Arts Emmy Awards	Outstanding Production Design for a Variety Special	Production Designers of SNL50 (Note: Akira Yoshimura, N. Joseph DeTullio, Patrick Lynch, Melissa Shakun, Charlotte Hayes Harrison, and Sabrina Lederer)	Nominated	
2025	Primetime Creative Arts Emmy Awards	Outstanding Sound Mixing for a Variety Series or Special	Sound Mixers of SNL50 (Note: Robert Palladino, Ezra Matychak, Frank Duca, Doug Nightwine, Christopher Costello, Caroline Sanchez, Josiah Gluck, Jay Vicari, Tyler McDiarmid, Geoff Countryman, Devin Emke, and Teng Chen)	Won	
2025	Primetime Creative Arts Emmy Awards	Outstanding Technical Direction and Camerawork for a Special	Technical team for SNL50 (Note: Bill DiGiovanni, John Pinto, Paul Cangialosi, Anthony Tarantino, Dave Driscoll, Brian Phraner, Daniel Erbeck, Michael Knarre, Anthony Lenzo, Ansel Nunez, and Rick Fox)	Won	
2025	Producers Guild of America Awards	Outstanding Producer of Live Entertainment, Variety, Sketch, Standup & Talk Television	Producers of SNL50	Nominated	
2025	Television Critics Association Awards	Outstanding Achievement in Sketch/Variety Shows	Saturday Night Live 50th Anniversary Special	Won	
2025	Writers Guild of America Awards	Comedy/Variety – Specials	Writers of SNL50	Nominated	
