= Saturday Night Live season 49 =

Saturday Night Live
- Season 49
- No. of episodes: 20

Release
- Original network: NBC
- Original release: October 14, 2023 – May 18, 2024

Season chronology
- ← Previous season 48 Next → season 50

The forty-ninth season of the NBC sketch comedy series Saturday Night Live premiered on October 14, 2023, during the 2023–24 television season, with host Pete Davidson and musical guest Ice Spice, and concluded on May 18, 2024 with host Jake Gyllenhaal and musical guest Sabrina Carpenter. The premiere was delayed due to the 2023 Writers Guild of America strike.

== Cast ==
After the departures of eleven cast members between seasons 46 and 48, the entire cast from the previous season returned. James Austin Johnson and Sarah Sherman, who both joined as featured players prior to season 47, were promoted to repertory status, while Marcello Hernandez, Molly Kearney, Michael Longfellow and Devon Walker, all of whom joined the previous season, remained as featured players. On October 4, 2023, New York City-based comedian Chloe Troast was announced as a new cast member.

While not credited as cast members, the comedy group and SNL staff writers Please Don't Destroy (Martin Herlihy, Ben Marshall, and John Higgins) continue to appear in digital videos. In some episodes, starting with this season's premiere, they received the credit "A Film by Please Don't Destroy" in the opening montage, marking the first time since Robert Smigel's "TV Funhouse" cartoons that a recurring segment has its own credit in the opening.

On August 1, 2024, it was announced that cast member Punkie Johnson would be departing the series, after four years. The next day, on August 2, fellow castmate and featured player Molly Kearney announced that they were leaving the show, after just two years. Chloe Troast was let go after this season.

=== Cast roster ===
**Repertory players**

- **Michael Che**
- Mikey Day
- Andrew Dismukes
- Chloe Fineman
- Heidi Gardner
- James Austin Johnson
- Punkie Johnson
- **Colin Jost**
- Ego Nwodim
- Sarah Sherman
- Kenan Thompson
- Bowen Yang

**Featured players**

- Marcello Hernandez
- Molly Kearney
- Michael Longfellow
- Chloe Troast
- Devon Walker

bold denotes "Weekend Update" anchor

== Writers ==
The entire writing staff from the previous season returned with no changes. Following the conclusion of the first half of the season, writer Ben Silva (who joined the writing staff in 2021) left the show. Beginning with the second half of the season, writer Steven Castillo (who previously wrote for the show from 2017 to 2021) rejoined the writing staff.

This would be the final season for writers Alex English, Vannessa Jackson (who both joined the writing staff in 2021 three seasons prior), and long time writer Gary Richardson (who had been in the writing staff for seven non-consecutive years since 2017 with the exception of the 2021-22 season and had been writing supervisor the previous two years).

== Episodes ==
No. overall	No. in season	Host	Musical guest	Original release date	U.S. viewers (millions)
949	1	Pete Davidson	Ice Spice	October 14, 2023	4.80
Ice Spice performs "In Ha Mood" and "Pretty Girl" with Rema, with Taylor Swift introducing the latter.; Davidson was an announced host for the previous season with musical guest Lil Uzi Vert, but both of their appearances were cancelled due to the 2023 Writers Guild of America strike.; In lieu of a cold open, Davidson shares some reflections on the 2023 Hamas attack on Israel.; For the first time in the series, "A Film by Please Don't Destroy" is announced in the opening credits.; Travis Kelce appears in the "Fox NFL Sunday" sketch.; John Mulaney appears in the pre-recorded "Please Don't Destroy – The Original Princes of Comedy" sketch, along with writers Ben Silva and Auguste White.; After Weekend Update, a title card encourages viewers to donate to the American Red Cross and the International Rescue Committee in light of the 2023 Hamas attack on Israel.; Chloe Troast's first episode as a cast member.
950	2	Bad Bunny	Bad Bunny	October 21, 2023	4.04
Bad Bunny performs "Un Preview" and "Monaco".; Pedro Pascal appears in the opening monologue, the "Protective Mom 2" sketch, and introduces Bad Bunny's second performance.; Fred Armisen appears in the pre-recorded "The Age of Discovery" sketch.; Mick Jagger appears in the "Telenovela" sketch and the "Convent Meeting" sketch.; Lady Gaga introduces Bad Bunny's first performance in Spanish.
951	3	Nate Bargatze	Foo Fighters	October 28, 2023	4.85
Foo Fighters perform "Rescued" and "The Glass" with H.E.R. Additionally, Dave Grohl appears in the pre-recorded "Lake Beach" sketch and the "Airplane" sketch.; This episode marks the group's first televised appearance since the death of drummer Taylor Hawkins in 2022.; Foo Fighters were initially scheduled to appear as a musical guest the previous season with host Jennifer Coolidge, but the appearance was cancelled due to the writers strike.; Beginning with this episode, Mikey Day takes over portraying President Joe Biden from James Austin Johnson.; Christopher Walken appears in the cold open and introduces Foo Fighters' first performance.; Padma Lakshmi appears in the "Chef Showdown" sketch.; Before the goodnights, a photo of actor Matthew Perry, who died hours before the episode aired, is shown in silence.
952	4	Timothée Chalamet	Boygenius	November 11, 2023	3.68
Boygenius performs "Not Strong Enough" and "Satanist" and appear in the "Troye Sivan Sleep Demon" sketch. For both of their performances, they dressed as The Beatles on The Ed Sullivan Show.; Writer John Higgins of Please Don't Destroy appears in the cold open as Ron DeSantis.; Alec Baldwin appears in the "Calm Sleep Story" sketch. This episode marks his first televised appearance since his shooting incident while filming Rust.
953	5	Jason Momoa	Tate McRae	November 18, 2023	N/A (<4.67)
Tate McRae performs "Greedy" and "Grave".; During the goodnights, Colin Jost holds up a sign reading "We love you, Dana and Paula", referring to the death of Dana Carvey's son Dex earlier in the week.
954	6	Emma Stone	Noah Kahan	December 2, 2023	3.89
Noah Kahan performs "Dial Drunk" and "Stick Season".; Lorne Michaels, Tina Fey, and Candice Bergen appear in the opening monologue. Fey and Bergen induct Stone into the Five-Timers Club.
955	7	Adam Driver	Olivia Rodrigo	December 9, 2023	4.22
Olivia Rodrigo performs "Vampire" and "All-American Bitch" and appears in the "Tiny-Ass Bag" sketch.; Julia Stiles appears on Weekend Update.; Before the goodnights, a photo of Norman Lear, who died earlier in the week, is shown in silence.; Former cast member Cecily Strong was invited to portray Elise Stefanik in the cold open parody of a congressional hearing about antisemitism on American college campuses. At the last minute, the role went to Chloe Troast after Strong felt uncomfortable with the portrayal.
956	8	Kate McKinnon	Billie Eilish	December 16, 2023	N/A (<4.67)
Billie Eilish performs "What Was I Made For?" and "Have Yourself a Merry Little Christmas", both with Finneas on piano and Christian McBride on bass for the latter, and appears in the "Whiskers R We" sketch and the pre-recorded "Tampon Farm" sketch.; Greta Gerwig joins McKinnon in introducing Eilish's first performance, "What Was I Made For?", which features a photo and video montage of various former and current SNL female cast members. Gerwig also appears in the prerecorded "Tampon Farm" sketch.; Maya Rudolph and Kristen Wiig appear in the opening monologue, the "ABBA Christmas" sketch, and the pre-recorded "Tampon Farm" sketch, in which Paula Pell also appears.
957	9	Jacob Elordi	Reneé Rapp	January 20, 2024	4.34
Reneé Rapp performs "Snow Angel" and "Not My Fault" with Megan Thee Stallion and appears in the "Lip Reader" sketch.; Rachel McAdams introduces Rapp's second performance and appears in the "Acting School" sketch.; Writers Alex English and Rosebud Baker appear in the monologue.; Xzibit appears in the cut-for-time pre-recorded "Please Don't Destroy – Pimp My Ride" sketch.
958	10	Dakota Johnson	Justin Timberlake	January 27, 2024	4.50
Justin Timberlake performs "Sanctified" with Tobe Nwigwe and "Selfish" and appears in the opening monologue and in "The Barry Gibb Talk Show" sketch.; Jimmy Fallon appears in the opening monologue, in "The Barry Gibb Talk Show" sketch, and introduces Timberlake's second performance.; Barbara Corcoran and Mark Cuban appear in the "Book Club" sketch.; Dave Chappelle appeared in the goodnights.
959	11	Ayo Edebiri	Jennifer Lopez	February 3, 2024	4.57
Jennifer Lopez performs "Can't Get Enough" with Latto and Redman and "This Is Me... Now".; Nikki Haley appears in the cold open and says "Live from New York, it's Saturday Night!"; Writer Martin Herlihy of Please Don't Destroy appears in the "Bad Couples" sketch.
960	12	Shane Gillis	21 Savage	February 24, 2024	3.99
21 Savage performs "Redrum" and a medley of "Should've Wore a Bonnet" with Brent Faiyaz and "Prove It" with Summer Walker.; Gillis was originally announced to be a cast member for season 45 in September 2019; he was fired within days, following backlash that resulted when clips of him using racist and homophobic language surfaced, beginning with one of him using an anti-Asian slur on his podcast that went viral on Twitter.
961	13	Sydney Sweeney	Kacey Musgraves	March 2, 2024	4.03
Kacey Musgraves performs "Deeper Well" and "Too Good to be True".; Glen Powell appears in the opening monologue and in the "Restaurant" sketch.; Gina Gershon appears in the pre-recorded "Bowen's Straight" sketch.
962	14	Josh Brolin	Ariana Grande	March 9, 2024	4.67
Ariana Grande performs "We Can't Be Friends (Wait for Your Love)" and "Imperfect For You" and appears in the "People Pleaser" sketch and the Moulin Rouge! sketch.; Scarlett Johansson appears as Katie Britt in the cold open.; Grande's mother Joan Grande introduces her second performance.; Following broadcast, elements during the "Bank Robbery" sketch that identified a Chase Bank as the setting were removed and replaced with signage for a fictional bank named Metro Capital.
963	15	Ramy Youssef	Travis Scott	March 30, 2024	3.89
Travis Scott performs "My Eyes" and "Fe!n" with Playboi Carti, and appears in the pre-recorded "Please Don't Destroy" film.; Both performances were excised from the episode's broadcast in the United Kingdom, but remained intact on streaming platforms.; Molly Kearney was credited in the opening montage but did not appear in the episode, although they was on stage during the goodnights.
964	16	Kristen Wiig	Raye	April 6, 2024	4.58
Raye performs "Escapism" and "Worth It".; Paul Rudd, Paula Pell, Matt Damon, Fred Armisen, Jon Hamm, Will Forte, Lorne Michaels, Martin Short, and Ryan Gosling appear in the opening monologue to induct Wiig into the Five-Timers Club.; Forte also appears in the "Jumanji" and "Retirement Party" sketches.; Hamm also appears in the "Secretaries" sketch.; Rudd, Armisen, and Damon also appear in the "Retirement Party" sketch.; Kaia Gerber appears in the pre-recorded "Pilates" sketch.; Wiig reprises her Aunt Linda character on Weekend Update.; Michael Longfellow was credited in the opening montage but did not appear in the episode, although he was on stage during the goodnights.
965	17	Ryan Gosling	Chris Stapleton	April 13, 2024	4.70
Chris Stapleton performs "White Horse" with his wife Morgane Stapleton and "Mountains of My Mind" and appears in the pre-recorded "Get That Boy Back" sketch.; Kate McKinnon appears in the cold open, reprising her character Colleen Rafferty, introduced alongside Gosling in a season 41 episode.; Emily Blunt appears in the opening monologue.; Caitlin Clark appears on Weekend Update.; Kyle Mooney appears in the cut-for-time "Papyrus 2" sketch.; Following seven days of catch-up viewing, this episode reached 7.51 million viewers (the highest linear audience since December 10, 2022); with additional viewing across digital platforms, this increased to 8.9 million (the largest cross-platform audience since December 11, 2021). This episode was also the show's "most watched ever" on Peacock.; With seven days of cross-platform catch-up viewing, this episode scored a 2.0 demo rating, the highest in that metric since November 12, 2022.; The episode also recorded the highest number of YouTube users who had "viewed a portion of the episode" since 2020 (46 million).
966	18	Dua Lipa	Dua Lipa	May 4, 2024	4.74
Dua Lipa performs "Illusion" and "Happy for You".; Both performances were excised from the episode's broadcast in the United Kingdom, but remained intact on streaming platforms.; Troye Sivan introduces Lipa's first performance.; Jerry Seinfeld appears on Weekend Update and introduces Lipa's second performance.; Chloe Troast was credited in the opening montage but did not appear in the episode, although she appeared on stage during the goodnights.
967	19	Maya Rudolph	Vampire Weekend	May 11, 2024	4.25
Vampire Weekend performs "Gen-X Cops" and "Capricorn", both with Ariel Rechtshaid.; Both performances were excised from the episode's broadcast in the United Kingdom, but remained intact on streaming platforms.; Most of the cast appeared alongside their mothers to start the show in lieu of a standard cold open, with the exception of Please Don't Destroy, who appear with actors playing their fathers.
968	20	Jake Gyllenhaal	Sabrina Carpenter	May 18, 2024	4.21
Sabrina Carpenter performs "Espresso" for her first set and a medley of "Feather" and "Nonsense" for her second. Additionally, Carpenter appears as Daphne Blake in the pre-recorded "Scooby-Doo" sketch.; Jon Hamm appears in the "Character Actor" sketch.; Before the goodnights, a still photo of Dabney Coleman, who died two days earlier, is shown in silence.; Punkie Johnson, Molly Kearney and Chloe Troast's final episode as cast members.

== Ratings ==
Viewership and ratings per episode of Saturday Night Live season 49
No.	Title	Air date	Rating (18–49)	Viewers (millions)	Total (18–49)	Total viewers (millions)	Ref.
1	"Pete Davidson / Ice Spice"	October 14, 2023	0.96	4.80	N/A	N/A	
2	"Bad Bunny"	October 21, 2023	0.74	4.04	N/A	N/A	
3	"Nate Bargatze / Foo Fighters"	October 28, 2023	0.78	4.85	N/A	N/A	
4	"Timothée Chalamet / Boygenius"	November 11, 2023	0.60	3.68	N/A	n/a / 6.0 (Note: Includes cross-platform viewing, such as on Peacock.)	
5	"Jason Momoa / Tate McRae"	November 18, 2023	N/A	N/A	N/A	N/A	—N/a
6	"Emma Stone / Noah Kahan"	December 2, 2023	0.57	3.89	N/A	n/a / 6.4	
7	"Adam Driver / Olivia Rodrigo"	December 9, 2023	0.70	4.22	N/A	N/A	
8	"Kate McKinnon / Billie Eilish"	December 16, 2023	N/A	N/A	N/A	N/A	—N/a
9	"Jacob Elordi / Reneé Rapp"	January 20, 2024	0.75	4.34	N/A	N/A	
10	"Dakota Johnson / Justin Timberlake"	January 27, 2024	0.74	4.50	N/A	N/A	
11	"Ayo Edebiri / Jennifer Lopez"	February 3, 2024	0.65	4.57	N/A	N/A	
12	"Shane Gillis / 21 Savage"	February 24, 2024	0.76	3.99	N/A	N/A	
13	"Sydney Sweeney / Kacey Musgraves"	March 2, 2024	0.64	4.025	N/A	N/A	
14	"Josh Brolin / Ariana Grande"	March 9, 2024	0.71	4.670	N/A	N/A	
15	"Ramy Youssef / Travis Scott"	March 30, 2024	0.61	3.892	N/A	N/A	
16	"Kristen Wiig / Raye"	April 6, 2024	0.82	4.575	N/A	N/A	
17	"Ryan Gosling / Chris Stapleton"	April 13, 2024	0.75	4.704	n/a / 2.0	7.51 / 8.9	
18	"Dua Lipa"	May 4, 2024	0.77	4.741	N/A	N/A	
19	"Maya Rudolph / Vampire Weekend"	May 11, 2024	0.68	4.251	N/A	N/A	
20	"Jake Gyllenhaal / Sabrina Carpenter"	May 18, 2024	0.66	4.205	N/A	N/A	
