= Molly Kearney =

American actor and comedian (born 1992)

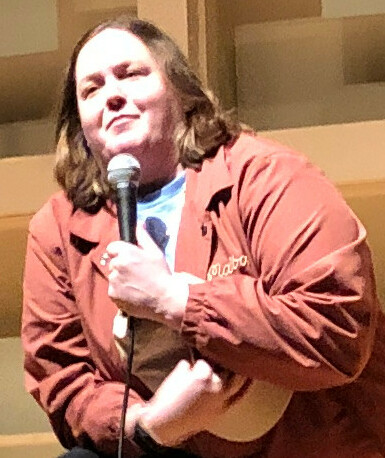
- Kearney in 2023
- Born: May 2, 1992 (age 34); Cleveland, Ohio, U.S.
- Education: University of Dayton (BA)

Comedy career
- Medium: Stand-up; television; digital

Molly Kearney (/ˈkɑːrni/; born May 2, 1992) is an American stand-up comedian and actor. They^{a} are best known for their work on Saturday Night Live and as Barbara in DMV.

== Life and career ==
Born and raised in Cleveland, they are a 2008 graduate of Magnificat High School and received a bachelor's in theatre from the University of Dayton. They frequently performed stand-up comedy in Chicago, later moving to Los Angeles.

In 2019, Kearney was one of the comedians selected for Comedy Central's "Up Next" showcase after a nationwide search.

Kearney's screen credits include the Amazon series A League of Their Own and the Disney+ series The Mighty Ducks: Game Changers.

In 2022, Kearney was hired to join the cast of the NBC sketch comedy series Saturday Night Live as a featured player for the show's 48th season, making their debut alongside Marcello Hernández, Michael Longfellow, and Devon Walker. They were the first openly non-binary cast member of Saturday Night Live. Kearney left the show in 2024 after its 49th season.

In 2025, they joined the main cast of the CBS's workplace comedy show DMV, starring alongside Harriet Dyer, Tony Cavalero, Alex Tarrant, Gigi Zumbado, and Tim Meadows. The show was canceled after just one season.

== Filmography ==
=== Television ===
Year	Title	Role	Notes
2022	A League of Their Own	Fern Dannely	Episode: "Find the Gap"
2022	The Mighty Ducks: Game Changers	Coach Dawn	4 episodes
2022 - 2024	Saturday Night Live	Various Roles	Seasons 48 & 49
2025 - 2026	DMV	Barbara	Main cast

=== Film ===
Year	Title	Role	Notes
2023	Good Burger 2	Alex the Security Guard	
2024	Riis	Marlee	Short film
2025	We Are Pat	Self	Documentary
2026	Dead End	Scout	Short film

== Notes ==
- ^a Kearney uses they/them pronouns.
