= Saturday Night Live season 48 =

Season of American television series

Saturday Night Live
- Season 48
- No. of episodes: 18

Release
- Original network: NBC/Peacock (select episodes)
- Original release: October 1, 2022 – April 15, 2023

Season chronology
- ← Previous season 47 Next → season 49

The forty-eighth season of the NBC sketch comedy series Saturday Night Live premiered on October 1, 2022, during the 2022–23 television season with host Miles Teller and musical guest Kendrick Lamar, and concluded on April 15, 2023, with host Ana de Armas and musical guest Karol G. The season was originally scheduled to air 21 episodes and conclude on May 20, 2023. However, due to the 2023 Writers Guild of America strike, the last three planned episodes were cancelled.

== Cast ==
Eight cast members from season 47 left the show prior to the beginning of this season, making it the biggest cast exodus since 1995. The departures of longtime cast members Aidy Bryant, Pete Davidson, Kate McKinnon, and Kyle Mooney were announced at the time of the season 47 finale, and in September 2022, several weeks prior to the start of this season, the departures of Alex Moffat, Chris Redd, Melissa Villaseñor, and featured player Aristotle Athari were announced. In response to all these changes, executive producer Lorne Michaels called this season a "transition year".

Michaels also stated that the COVID-19 pandemic was the reason why all those cast members stayed on longer than usual, compared to previous casts, and that they would've left earlier had it not happened, saying most cast "had nowhere to go" during the pandemic. Bryant and McKinnon separately confirmed this was the case for themselves.

Returning cast member Cecily Strong took a temporary leave of absence early in the season due to her commitments to perform in the Los Angeles revival of the one-woman stage play The Search for Signs of Intelligent Life in the Universe, returning to SNL for the October 29, 2022, episode. Strong then departed several weeks later on December 17 after being on the show for 10½ seasons since 2012, making her the longest-tenured female cast member in the show's history.

On September 12, 2022, Michaels announced that four new cast members would be joining the show: stand-up comedians Marcello Hernández, Molly Kearney (the show's first non-binary cast member), Michael Longfellow, and Devon Walker.

A few years later (ahead of the show's 50th season), he also stated that the reason why he had been hiring so many stand-ups (over the course of seasons 46–48) is because many of their go-to improv clubs like The Groundlings, Second City, and Upright Citizens Brigade were shut down during the pandemic. Stating in part that "a whole generation" of improv comedians weren't auditioning, but stand-ups were.

Andrew Dismukes and Punkie Johnson, who were both hired as featured players for season 46, were promoted to repertory status this season, while James Austin Johnson and Sarah Sherman, both of whom were hired for season 47, remained as featured players.

This season saw the death of longtime production designer Eugene Lee, who died on February 6, 2023, and had worked on the show since the show's premiere on October 11, 1975, with the exception of seasons 6–10 (1980–1985).

=== Cast roster ===
**Repertory players**

- **Michael Che**
- Mikey Day
- Andrew Dismukes
- Chloe Fineman
- Heidi Gardner
- Punkie Johnson
- **Colin Jost**
- Ego Nwodim
- Cecily Strong (final episode: December 17, 2022)
- Kenan Thompson
- Bowen Yang

**Featured players**

- Marcello Hernández
- James Austin Johnson
- Molly Kearney
- Michael Longfellow
- Sarah Sherman
- Devon Walker

bold denotes "Weekend Update" anchor

== Writers ==
Prior to the start of the season, Colin Jost and Michael Che (who had been head writers since 2017), stepped down from their positions, though remained on the writing staff for the season. Writers Jimmy Fowlie, Ceara O'Sullivan, Auguste White, and KC Shornima were all hired as new writers (with Shornima specifically writing for Weekend Update). Asha Ward joined the writing staff starting with the December 3, 2022 episode.

Beginning with the February 4, 2023 episode, writers Gary Richardson (who had been a writer since 2017 with the exception of the previous 2021-22 season), Will Stephen (who's been a writer on the show since 2015), and Celeste Yim (who joined the writing staff in 2020) were promoted to writing supervisors.

== Episodes ==
No. overall	No. in season	Host(s)	Musical guest	Original release date	U.S. viewers (millions)
931	1	Miles Teller	Kendrick Lamar	October 1, 2022	4.02
Kendrick Lamar performs a medley of "Rich Spirit" and "N95" for his first set and "Father Time" with Sampha for his second.; Jon Hamm and Shaun White appear in the cold open.; Cecily Strong was not featured in the opening credits due to her being temporarily unavailable because of her performance in the Los Angeles production of The Search for Signs of Intelligent Life in the Universe.; This episode aired concurrently on Peacock, with future episodes available one day after broadcast. It is the first episode to stream exclusively on Peacock since NBC's prior next-day streaming rights deal with Hulu ended in mid-September.; Marcello Hernández, Molly Kearney, Michael Longfellow, and Devon Walker's first episode as cast members.
932	2	Brendan Gleeson	Willow	October 8, 2022	3.76
Willow performs "Curious/Furious" and "Ur a Stranger".; Colin Farrell appears in the opening monologue and the "Headshots" sketch.; Writers Martin Herlihy, John Higgins, and Ben Marshall appear in the pre-recorded "Please Don't Destroy – Tommy" sketch.
933	3	Megan Thee Stallion	Megan Thee Stallion	October 15, 2022	3.72
Megan Thee Stallion performs "Anxiety" for her first set and a medley of "NDA" and "Plan B" for her second.; Writers Martin Herlihy, John Higgins, and Ben Marshall appear in the pre-recorded "Please Don't Destroy – Wellness" sketch.; Bowen Yang introduces Megan Thee Stallion's first performance.; Kenan Thompson introduces Megan Thee Stallion's second performance.
934	4	Jack Harlow	Jack Harlow	October 29, 2022	4.12
Jack Harlow performs a medley of "Lil Secret" and "First Class" for his first set and "State Fair" for his second.; Jeff Probst appears in the "Joker Wedding" sketch.; Tom Hanks appears in the "AA Meeting" sketch, introduces Harlow's first performance, and appears as David S. Pumpkins in the "David Pumpkins Returns" sketch.; Bobby Moynihan appears as Drunk Uncle on Weekend Update and appears in the "David Pumpkins Returns" sketch.; Cecily Strong returns after being absent for the first three episodes of the season. She also introduces Harlow's second performance.
935	5	Amy Schumer	Steve Lacy	November 5, 2022	4.32
Steve Lacy performs "Bad Habit" and "Helmet".; After Weekend Update, a photo of rapper Takeoff, who died earlier in the week, is shown in silence.
936	6	Dave Chappelle	Black Star	November 12, 2022	4.75
Black Star with Madlib perform "So Be It" and "The Main Thing Is to Keep the Main Thing the Main Thing" and appear in the "Heaven Scene" sketch.; Donnell Rawlings and Ice-T appear in the pre-recorded House of the Dragon sketch. Rawlings also appears in the "Heaven Scene" sketch.; Writers Martin Herlihy, John Higgins, and Ben Marshall, as well as Steve Kornacki, appear in the pre-recorded "Please Don't Destroy – Election Night" sketch.; Chappelle's monologue was criticized as being antisemitic by Anti-Defamation League CEO Jonathan Greenblatt.
937	7	Keke Palmer	SZA	December 3, 2022	3.99
SZA performs "Shirt" and "Blind" and appears in the pre-recorded "Big Boys" sketch.; During her monologue, Keke Palmer confirmed rumors that she is pregnant.; Natasha Lyonne appears in the "Hello Kitty" sketch.; Kel Mitchell appears in the pre-recorded "Kenan & Kelly" sketch and in the goodnights.
938	8	Steve Martin & Martin Short	Brandi Carlile	December 10, 2022 (Note: During the episode's original airing, the audio in some markets was out of sync during the cold open and part of the opening monologue. This issue was fixed partway through the monologue, and the rerun later that night had the audio synced with the video.)	5.06
Brandi Carlile performs "The Story" for her first set and "You and Me on the Rock" with Lucius for her second.; Short introduces Carlile's first performance while Martin introduces Carlile's second performance.; Selena Gomez appears in the opening monologue and in the Father of the Bride – Part 8 sketch.; Writers Martin Herlihy, John Higgins, and Ben Marshall, as well as Sarah Sherman's father, Mike Sherman, appear in the pre-recorded "Please Don't Destroy – Chelsea" sketch.; Kieran Culkin appears in the Father of the Bride – Part 8 sketch.
939	9	Austin Butler	Lizzo (Note: Yeah Yeah Yeahs were originally booked as this episode's musical guest, but had to cancel the week prior due to guitarist Nick Zinner's hospitalization for pneumonia.)	December 17, 2022	4.36
Lizzo performs "Break Up Twice" and "Someday at Christmas" and appears in the pre-recorded "Please Don't Destroy – Plirts" sketch.; During her first performance, Lizzo honored deceased artist Annie Lee's painting, Blue Monday, by appearing in a white dress in front of a blue background.; Writers Martin Herlihy, John Higgins, and Ben Marshall appear in the pre-recorded "Please Don't Destroy – Plirts" sketch.; Cecily Strong’s final episode as a cast member; to mark her departure, Butler and the cast perform "Blue Christmas".
940	10	Aubrey Plaza	Sam Smith	January 21, 2023	4.81
Sam Smith performs "Unholy" with Kim Petras and "Gloria" with Sharon Stone appearing during the performance.; Petras makes history as the first transgender woman to perform on the show.; Stone also appears in the "Film Noir" sketch.; President Joe Biden makes a pre-recorded appearance in the opening monologue.; Amy Poehler appears in the opening monologue and reprises her Parks and Recreation role as Leslie Knope on Weekend Update (alongside Plaza's reprisal of April Ludgate).; Longtime production designer Akira Yoshimura appears in the opening monologue.; Drew Scott, Jonathan Scott, and Tony Hawk appear in the "Miss Universe" sketch.; Allison Williams appears in the pre-recorded "M3GAN 2.0" sketch.
941	11	Michael B. Jordan	Lil Baby	January 28, 2023	4.17
Lil Baby performs "California Breeze" and "Forever" with Chloe Flower on piano and Fridayy appearing on the screen singing the chorus.; Writers Alex English and Ceara O'Sullivan appear in the pre-recorded “Falling Down” sketch.; Molly Kearney was credited in the opening montage but did not appear in the episode, although they were on stage during the goodnights.
942	12	Pedro Pascal	Coldplay	February 4, 2023	4.30
Coldplay performs "The Astronaut" and a medley of "Human Heart" and "Fix You" with Jacob Collier and the Jason Max Ferdinand Singers.; Actress Natasha Ofili appears in the first performance, performing ASL interpretation while wearing a blue Alien mask.; Sarah Paulson appears in the "Fancam Assembly" sketch.; The "Fancam Assembly" sketch features the song "Big Boys" from this season's Keke Palmer episode.; Andrew Dismukes was credited in the opening montage but did not appear in this episode, although he was on stage during the goodnights.
943	13	Woody Harrelson	Jack White	February 25, 2023	4.16
Jack White performs a medley of "Taking Me Back" and "Fear of the Dawn" for his first set and "A Tip from You to Me" for his second.; Writers Martin Herlihy, John Higgins, and Ben Marshall appear in the pre-recorded "Please Don't Destroy – Stakeout" sketch.; After Weekend Update, a tribute to longtime production designer Eugene Lee, who died February 6, is shown in silence.; Before the goodnights, a photo of Richard Belzer, who died earlier in the week, is shown in silence.; Scarlett Johansson appears in the goodnights to induct Harrelson into the Five-Timers Club. A jacket was also given to White, a five-time musical guest by Kenan Thompson.; Punkie Johnson was credited in the opening montage but did not appear in the episode, although she was on stage during the goodnights.
944	14	Travis Kelce	Kelsea Ballerini	March 4, 2023	4.52
Kelsea Ballerini performs "Blindsided" and "Penthouse".; Writers Martin Herlihy, John Higgins, and Ben Marshall appear in the pre-recorded "Please Don't Destroy – Self-Defense" sketch.; Kelce's parents, Ed and Donna, and his brother, Jason, appear in the opening monologue. Jason also appears in the "Abby the Ex-Girlfriend" sketch.; After Weekend Update, a photograph of John Head, one of the show's original editors, is shown in silence.; Andrew Dismukes and Molly Kearney were credited in the opening montage but did not appear in the episode, although both were on stage during the goodnights.
945	15	Jenna Ortega	The 1975	March 11, 2023	4.24
The 1975 performs "I'm in Love with You" and "Oh Caroline".; Fred Armisen appears in the opening monologue and in the "Parent Trap" sketch.; Writers Martin Herlihy, John Higgins, and Ben Marshall appear in the pre-recorded "Please Don't Destroy – Road Trip" sketch.; Before the goodnights, a photo of Erin Maroney Fraser, an assistant who worked on the show for several years, and who died March 3, is shown in silence.
946	16	Quinta Brunson	Lil Yachty	April 1, 2023	4.21
Lil Yachty, with Diana Gordon, performs "the BLACK seminole." and "drive ME crazy!".; Writers Martin Herlihy, John Higgins, and Ben Marshall appear in the pre-recorded "Please Don't Destroy – Street Eats" sketch.
947	17	Molly Shannon	Jonas Brothers	April 8, 2023	4.14
Jonas Brothers perform "Waffle House" for their first set and "Walls" with Jon Bellion and Kirk Franklin for their second.; Nick Jonas appears in "The Play" sketch, and Nick, Joe and Kevin appear in the "New Choreographer" sketch.; Martin Short and Lorne Michaels appear in the opening monologue.; Writers Martin Herlihy, John Higgins, and Ben Marshall appear in the pre-recorded "Please Don't Destroy – Molly Shannon 2K23" sketch.; Shannon reprises her roles as Jeannie Darcy in the pre-recorded "Jeannie Darcy: Selective Startage" sketch and Sally O'Malley in the "New Choreographer" sketch.; During the goodnights, James Austin Johnson and Devon Walker jointly hold and Punkie Johnson wears a shirt with Justin Jones and Justin J. Pearson's names on them.
948	18	Ana de Armas	Karol G	April 15, 2023	3.80
Karol G performs "Mientras Me Curo del Cora" and "Tus Gafitas" and appears in the "Spanish Class" sketch.; This is the first time in the show's history both the host and musical guest are Latina.; Writers Martin Herlihy, John Higgins, and Ben Marshall appear in the pre-recorded "Please Don't Destroy – Hangxiety" sketch.

=== Episodes canceled due to writers strike ===
The following episodes were publicly announced, but cancelled due to the 2023 Writers Guild of America strike.

Scheduled airdate	Booked host	Booked musical guest	Ref.
May 6, 2023	Pete Davidson (Note: Davidson hosted the next season's premiere episode, on October 14, 2023.)	Lil Uzi Vert	
May 13, 2023	Kieran Culkin	Labrinth	
May 20, 2023	Jennifer Coolidge	Foo Fighters (Note: Foo Fighters performed as the musical guest on October 28, 2023, the third episode of the next season.)	
