= Lorne (film) =

2026 film by Morgan Neville

- Theatrical release poster
- Directed by: Morgan Neville
- Written by: Morgan Neville; Alan Lowe; Jake Hostetter
- Produced by: Morgan Neville; Lauren Belfer
- Narrated by: Chris Parnell
- Cinematography: Graham Willoughby
- Edited by: Alan Lowe; Jake Hostetter
- Music by: Darian Sahanaja
- Production company: Tremolo Productions
- Distributed by: Focus Features
- Release date: April 17, 2026
- Running time: 102 minutes
- Country: United States
- Language: English
- Box office: $449,135

Lorne is a 2026 American documentary film co-written, produced, and directed by Morgan Neville. It was released theatrically in the United States on April 17, 2026, by Focus Features.

== Premise ==
The film is about the Canadian film and television producer Lorne Michaels. It touches upon his early work on Canadian television in The Hart and Lorne Terrific Hour, the early days of Saturday Night Live, his departure, the failure of The New Show, and his eventual return to Saturday Night Live.

The film additionally focuses on his present role at the show, featuring interviews with past hosts, writers, and cast members.

The film also includes exclusive behind-the-scenes footage of Season 49 episodes from hosted by:

- Timothée Chalamet
- Emma Stone
- Kate McKinnon
- Ayo Edebiri
- Shane Gillis
- Ryan Gosling
- Jake Gyllenhaal

== Appearances ==
- Fred Armisen
- Alec Baldwin
- Candice Bergen
- Dana Carvey
- Chevy Chase
- Michael Che
- Mikey Day
- James Downey
- Jimmy Fallon
- Tina Fey
- Al Franken
- Bill Hader
- Steve Higgins
- Colin Jost
- Michael Longfellow
- Steve Martin
- Bruce McCulloch
- Kate McKinnon
- Seth Meyers
- Lorne Michaels
- John Mulaney
- Mike Myers
- Laraine Newman
- Conan O'Brien
- Chris Parnell – Narrator
- Paula Pell
- Chris Rock
- Maya Rudolph
- Andy Samberg
- Adam Sandler
- Sarah Sherman
- Howard Shore
- Rosie Shuster
- Paul Simon
- Robert Smigel
- David Spade
- Kenan Thompson
- Lily Tomlin
- Kristen Wiig
- Bowen Yang

== Production ==
The film features both newly filmed as well as archival behind the scenes footage of Saturday Night Live, in addition to interviews with various current and former cast members, writers and hosts. Featured alumni include Tina Fey, Chris Rock, Conan O'Brien, Maya Rudolph, Andy Samberg, John Mulaney, as well as Jimmy Fallon, Seth Meyers, Kristen Wiig, Mike Myers, and Paul Simon. Alan Lowe edited the film, lasting from 2024 to 2025. Darian Sahanaja composed the score for the film. Robert Smigel also penned and voiced several new TV Funhouse shorts for the film, filling in narrative gaps.

== Release ==
The film was released theatrically in the United States on April 17, 2026, by Focus Features.

== Reception ==
=== Box office ===
As of April 19, 2026, Lorne grossed $270,000 at 415 theaters.

=== Critical response ===
On the review aggregator website Rotten Tomatoes, 73% of 49 critics' reviews are positive, with an average rating of 6.9/10. The website's consensus reads: "While the famously tight-lipped Lorne Michaels escapes closer scrutiny yet again in Morgan Neville's affectionate documentary, this tour through the SNL maestro's career is packed with plenty of amusing and worthwhile anecdotes." Metacritic, which uses a weighted average, assigned the film a score of 57 out of 100, based on 14 critics, indicating "mixed or average" reviews.

John Serba of Decider described Lorne as "shallow but enjoyable," praising the documentary's entertaining behind-the-scenes look at Saturday Night Live while criticizing its lack of substantive biography. M.N. Miller of FandomWire described Lorne as "a rare documentary about a comedy legend that leaves audiences knowing less when they leave the theater than when they walked in."
