= Celeste Yim =

Korean-Canadian writer

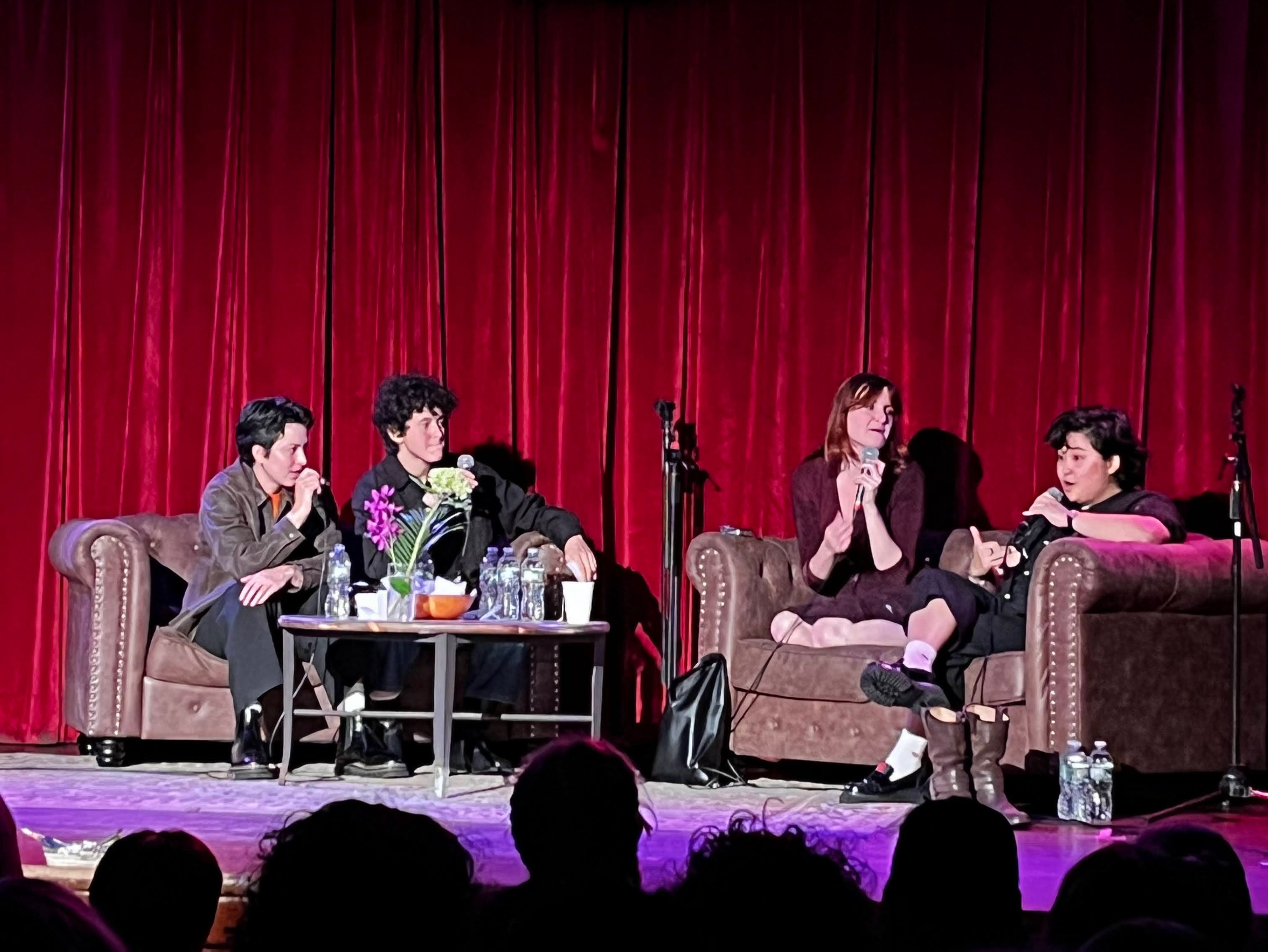
Yim (far right) with the band MUNA in 2024

Celeste Yim is a Korean-Canadian comedian and writer.

== Early life ==
Celeste Yim earned a bachelor's degree in media, gender and English from the University of Toronto and a Master of Fine Arts from NYU Tisch School of the Arts. They graduated from Toronto French School in 2013.

== Career ==
Yim's career began in the mid-2010s, in indie stand-up shows in Toronto. They were named to the Bob Curry fellowship for The Second City and worked as a juror for the Toronto Sketch Comedy Festival. In 2017, Flare named them one of Canada's Top 100 Notable Women. They have written on topics of Korean-Canadian identity and racism in pop culture for publications including Vice and The Globe and Mail.

In 2019, Yim was awarded the Canadian Women Artists' Award by the New York Foundation for the Arts. In May of that year, their play Not Only Is Everyone As Wonderful was produced at the National MFA Playwrights Festival. In 2021, Yim became a Lambda Literary Playwriting Fellow.

In 2020, Yim was hired as a writer for Saturday Night Live, becoming the show's first writer to identify as non-binary (a non-binary cast member wouldn't come until season 48 with Molly Kearney) and the first writer to be openly trans. In 2023, during the second half of season 48, they became a writing supervisor for the show. In 2025, they announced they had left the show after five seasons.

== Personal life ==
Yim uses they/them pronouns.
