= Ladies & Gentlemen... 50 Years of SNL Music =

2025 American documentary film

- Directed by: Questlove; Oz Rodriguez
- Country of origin: United States
- Original language: English

Production
- Production companies: Broadway Video; RadicalMedia; Two One Five Entertainment

Original release
- Network: NBC
- Release: January 27, 2025

Ladies & Gentlemen... 50 Years of SNL Music is a 2025 American documentary film, directed by Ahmir "Questlove" Thompson and Oz Rodriguez. The film focuses on the late-night sketch show Saturday Night Live and its half-century of musical performances. The film premiered on NBC on January 27, 2025, and began streaming on Peacock the next day, as part of the lead up to the show's 50th anniversary special.

== Premise ==
The documentary examines the late-night sketch program Saturday Night Live and its musical guests across its 50-year run. Dozens of cast and crew members are interviewed as well as musical guests and the show's house band. The film examines the show's relationship to the New York music scene, as well as changing and evolving popular styles. It dives deep into its musical history in its sketches, with segments on impressions, Adam Sandler, the origin of the Blues Brothers and The Lonely Island's rise to prominence.

The film also explores key musical performances and moments throughout the show's half-century run, including:

- An in-depth analysis into the show's relationship with new wave bands (the B-52's) as well as eclectic and experimental acts (Captain Beefheart)
- Elvis Costello switching songs live on air in 1977, and his supposed "ban" from the show
- The show's hip-hop history, including the 1981 debut of Funky 4 + 1, the first rap act on national television
- Fear's chaotic 1981 performance with a mosh pit
- Debuts of acts like Nirvana and Dua Lipa
- Sinéad O'Connor's 1992 appearance during which she controversially ripped up a photograph of Pope John Paul II
- Rage Against the Machine's explosive 1996 spot, during which they attempted to hang upside-down American flags on their amps in protest of billionaire host Steve Forbes
- The show's first post-9/11 broadcast with Paul Simon and Rudy Giuliani
- Ashlee Simpson's infamous 2004 appearance in which she lip synced
- Kanye West's history on the show, both his impact on guests' visual capabilities and many controversies, including a 2018 MAGA rant

== Production ==
Thompson was first approached about making the documentary in 2021, following the release of his first film, Summer of Soul. An SNL obsessive, Thompson had long been a fan of the show since his childhood, viewing it as a paradigm-shifting program like Soul Train. When he became a member of the house band for Late Night with Jimmy Fallon in 2009, he began working just two floors down from the show's studio. "When I first got to 30 Rock in 2009, I purposely waited six months to figure out how I was going to infiltrate the SNL ecosystem," he joked. "Who am I going to be friends with so I can see how it works?" Directing the feature required that Thompson view every episode of SNL—900 by the time of its creation—which was a daunting task. To prepare, he watched between three and seven episodes daily.

== Reception ==
Jem Aswad of Variety extolled the film as "definitive," writing that "Even though the doc is three hours long and loaded with interviews [...] it never falls into hubristic self-congratulation." Late-night commentator Bill Carter, author of The Late Shift, called it "fascinating and engrossing." Jen Chaney from Vulture viewed it as "throroughtly spectacular," commenting, "the documentary offers a comprehensive, dynamic, and genuinely exciting tour through five decades of rock, hip-hop, punk, and other genres as manifested within the walls of 30 Rock." Many critics heaped praise on Questlove's "mega mix" cold open.

=== Accolades ===
Questlove and Oz were nominated for the Outstanding Directing for a Documentary/Nonfiction Program at the 77th Primetime Creative Arts Emmy Awards.
