= Aristotle Athari =

American comedian and actor (born 1991)

- Born: July 28, 1991 (age 35)
- Other name: Aristotle Athiras
- Years active: 2008–present
- Spouse: Maura Grace (m. 2021)

Aristotle Athari (born 1991), also known as Aristotle Athiras, is an American comedian and actor. Athari was a cast member on the NBC sketch comedy series Saturday Night Live during its 47th season between 2021 and 2022. He has appeared in Molli and Max in the Future (2023) and M3GAN 2.0 (2025).

== Career ==
After starting his career in stand-up comedy, Athari began collaborating with Muslim-American comedians Hasan Minhaj, Asif Ali, and Fahim Anwar on sketches under the group name Goatface. An hour-long special of their sketch work aired on Comedy Central in 2018. He had a recurring role on the final season of HBO's Silicon Valley as Gabe. Athari also cohosts the improvised podcast "This Is Americans Live," a parody of the radio show This American Life.

In 2021, Athari was cast as a featured player on Saturday Night Live, alongside fellow newcomers James Austin Johnson and Sarah Sherman, for its forty-seventh season. He was the second Iranian American and second Middle Eastern American cast member in the show's history, after Nasim Pedrad. He did not return for the 48th season of SNL.

== Personal life ==
Athari married photographer Maura Grace Hooper in September 2021.

== Filmography ==
=== Film ===
Year	Title	Role	Notes
2008	Hanging in Hedo	Twon	
2012	Indian Spider-Man	—N/a	Short film; as director
2016	Funny Man	Donovan	
2023	Molli and Max in the Future	Max	
2024	The French Italian		
2025	M3GAN 2.0	Christian Bradley	

=== Television ===
Year	Title	Role	Notes
2019	The Coop	Derrick	15 episodes
2019	Silicon Valley	Gabe	5 episodes
2021–2022	Saturday Night Live	Various	Featured player
2024-2025	Hacks	Lewis	3 episodes
2025	Bat-Fam	Mad Hatter (voice)	2 episodes
