= Emil Wakim =

American comedian (born 1998)

- Born: Emil Pierre Wakim; March 11, 1998 (age 28); Chicago, Illinois, U.S.
- Education: Indiana University Bloomington (BA)
- Occupations: Comedian; actor

Emil Pierre Wakim (born March 11, 1998) is an American comedian and actor. He was a featured cast member on Saturday Night Live for its 50th season.

== Early life ==
Wakim was born in Chicago, Illinois, of Lebanese descent. He identifies as an Arab Christian. He graduated from Hinsdale South High School and attended college at Indiana University Bloomington.

== Career ==
Wakim was selected as a New Face of Comedy at the Just for Laughs Comedy Festival. He has opened for comedians including Roy Wood Jr., Kyle Kinane, Nikki Glaser, Hasan Minhaj, and Neal Brennan. In 2022, he made an appearance on The Tonight Show Starring Jimmy Fallon. In September 2024, Wakim was announced as one of three new featured cast members on Saturday Night Live for its 50th season. He is the show's first cast member of Lebanese heritage. On August 27, 2025, Wakim announced on Instagram that he was let go prior to SNL's 51st season, saying the decision was a "gut punch" but that he was grateful for his time at SNL.

== Personal life ==
Wakim resides in Brooklyn, New York City, New York.
