= Devon Walker (comedian) =

American comedian (born 1991)

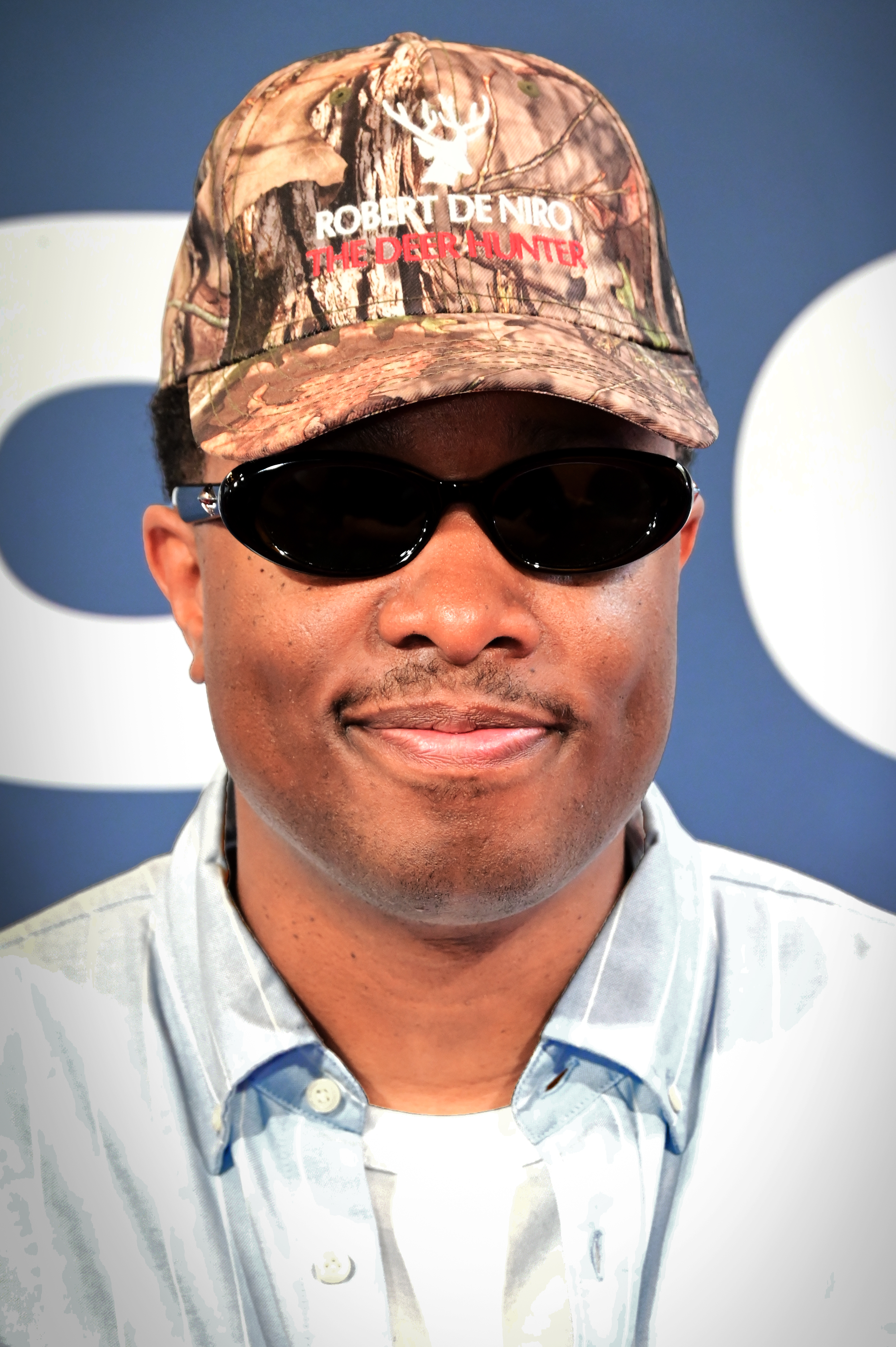
- Walker in 2026
- Born: February 13, 1991 (age 35); Washington
- Education: Texas State University (BS); St. Edward's University (MS)
- Occupations: Stand-up comedian; actor; writer

Comedy career
- Years active: 2014–present
- Medium: Stand-up; television; digital

Devon Walker (born February 13, 1991) is an American stand-up comedian, actor, and writer. He is most known for his work on Saturday Night Live.

== Early life ==
Devon Walker was born February 13, 1991 in Washington. He grew up mainly in Austin, Texas, though he also spent part of his childhood in Pflugerville. He attended Texas State University and graduated with a degree in psychology. He has a master's degree in organizational leadership from St. Edward's University.

== Career ==
Walker began his comedy career with his first open mic event in late 2014, as he was beginning graduate school. He moved to New York City in 2018, where he hosted the monthly comedy show Dad with comics Alex English and Gary Richardson at The Jane.

In 2017, Walker was chosen for their Up Next showcase, and in 2019, he had his own special on Comedy Central Stand-Up Featuring. He has written for the animated Netflix comedy Big Mouth and the 2022 Freeform comedy series Everything's Trash.

In 2022, Walker joined the cast of the NBC sketch comedy series Saturday Night Live as a featured player for the show's 48th season. He was promoted to repertory status in 2024, and left the show in 2025, following the conclusion of the show's 50th season. Walker participated in the show's 50th anniversary special.

In 2025, Walker started the music themed podcast "My Favorite Lyrics with Devon Walker", where he and a guest break down the lyrics from their favorite songs and to talk about the music that shaped their lives.

In January 2026, Amazon Prime announced Walker with seven other actors and actresses as guest stars in its upcoming television series Barbershop.

== Filmography ==
=== Film ===
Year	Title	Role	Director(s)	Notes
2022	Mirra	Cody	Sam Evoy	Short film
2025	Baquiné Friends Forever	Gary	Jose Acevedo	Short film
2025	Fame and Other Four Letter Words	—N/a	Miranda Kahn	Short film
2026	Lucy Schulman	TBA	Ellie Sachs	Post-production

=== Television ===
Year	Title	Role	Notes
2017	Comedy Central's Colossal Clusterfest	Self	Television special
2018	Inside Joke at Moontower	Self	Episode: "Devon Walker"
2019	Comedy Central Stand-Up Featuring	Self	Episode: "Devon Walker"
2019	Life Fails	Self	Miniseries
2020	SpongeBob DocuPants	Mike Mitchell; Donald Hanover	Episodes: "The Hash Slinging Slasher"; "A Lobster's Journey"
2020	As Seen ON CC	Guest	Episode: "MaskMints"
2020	Ayo and Rachel Are Single	Devon	Episode: "S**tty Guy Party"
2020	Bite Size Halloween	Will	Episode: "Baby"
2021	Mini-Mocks	Guest	Episode: "Drone Flying Drug Dealer"
2021	G.O.A.T.	Self	
2022	Big Mouth	Guest	Episode: "Twenty Two and You"; Also screenwriter–10 episodes
2022	Everything's Trash	—N/a	Screenwriter–10 episodes
2022–25	Saturday Night Live	Various	57 episodes
2025	Saturday Night Live 50th Anniversary Special	Self	Television special
2026	Barbershop	Guest	Episode: "South Side" (Pilot)
