= Sarah Sherman =

American comedian & actress (born 1993)

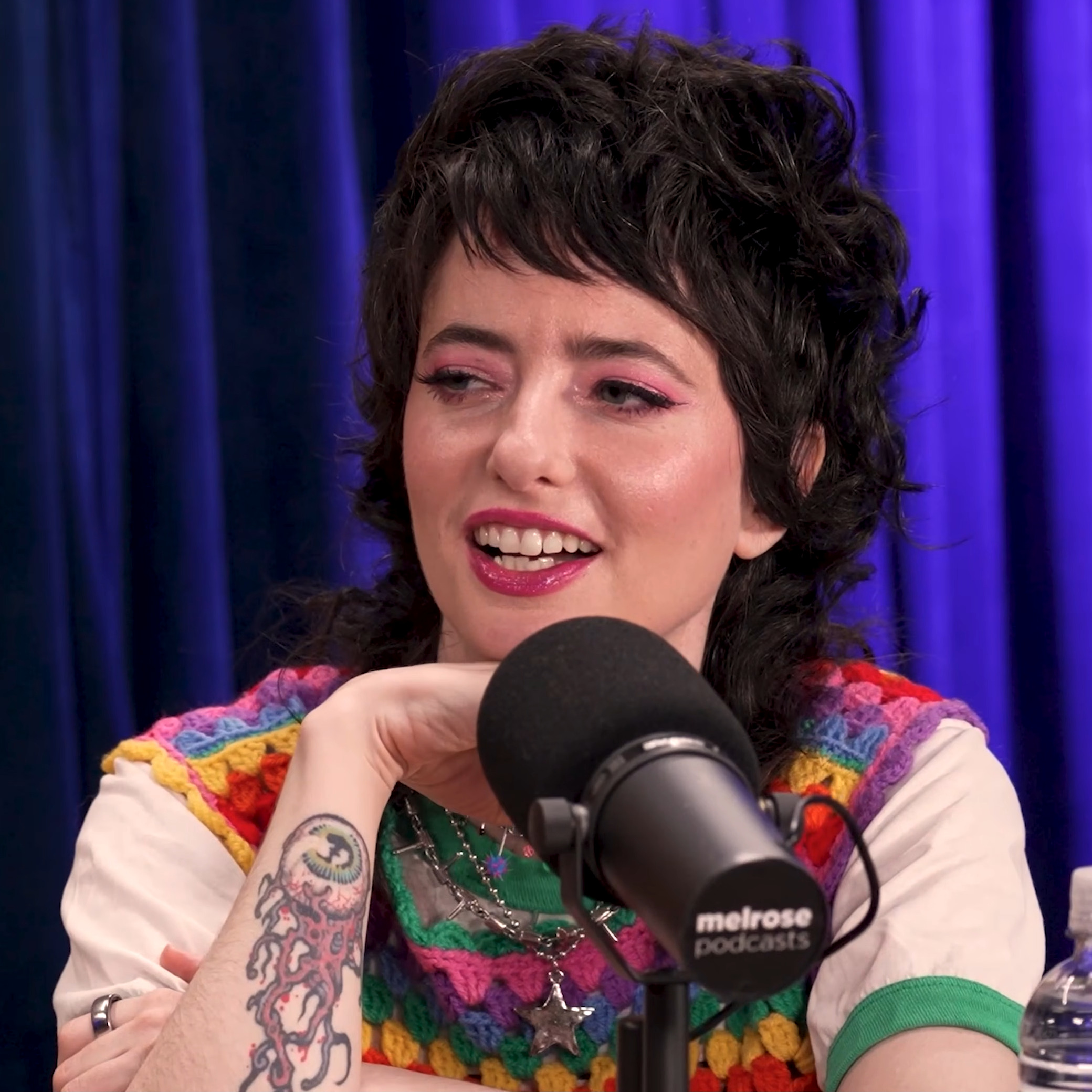
- Sherman in 2026
- Born: Sarah Nicole Sherman; March 7, 1993 (age 33); Great Neck, New York, U.S.
- Other name: Sarah Squirm
- Education: Northwestern University (BA)
- Occupations: Comedian; actress; screenwriter
- Years active: 2013–present
- Television: Saturday Night Live
- Website: sarahsquirm.com

Sarah Nicole Sherman (born March 7, 1993), also known professionally as Sarah Squirm, is an American comedian, actress, and screenwriter. Sherman is known for using surreal and body horror comedy. She became a featured player on the NBC sketch comedy series Saturday Night Live starting with its 47th season in October 2021, and was promoted to repertory status in October 2023.

She has also appeared in films including Nimona, Rap World, Pizza Movie, and Teenage Sex and Death at Camp Miasma, as well as multiple projects produced by Adam Sandler’s Happy Madison Productions, including You Are So Not Invited to My Bat Mitzvah and Roommates.

== Early life and education ==
Sherman was born and raised in Great Neck, Long Island, New York, into a Jewish family. She told Variety, "I grew up liking, you know, crazy cartoons, and I love Joan Rivers and The Nanny and Garbage Pail Kids and Ren & Stimpy and stuff like that." She told another interviewer, "I had Raggedy Ann dolls. Thinking about it now, Raggedy Ann has heavily influenced the way I dress. I had a bunch of Lamb Chop dolls, too. I'm a huge Lamb Chop freak because Shari Lewis was a Jewish comedian, and I have a giant Lamb Chop tattoo on my leg."

She attended Great Neck South High School, where she was on the improv team and ran track, graduating in 2011. She subsequently graduated from Northwestern University in 2015 with a degree in theater.

== Career ==
=== Early work ===
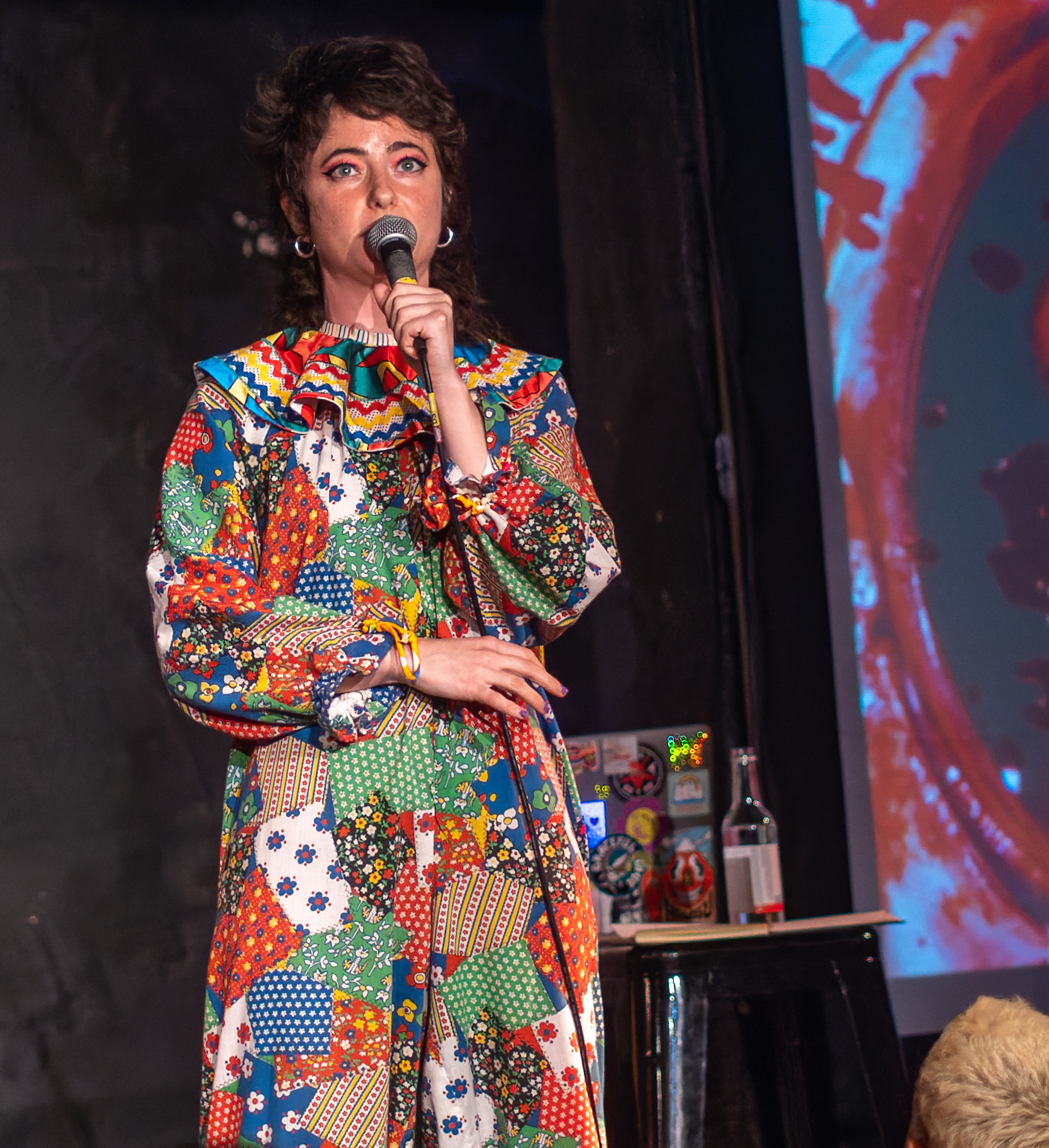
Sherman performing in 2022

Sherman developed an interest in stand-up comedy after she did not make the improv team at Northwestern. After graduating, she decided to stay in Chicago, befriending the comedian Megan Stalter. She also had a monthly show called Helltrap Nightmare along with Luke Taylor, David Brown, Wyatt Fair, and Scott Egleston. Sherman began performing under her stage name "Sarah Squirm", which was inspired by a high school nickname. She was also getting booked as a comedian alongside noise musicians as she had friends who ran a record label.

In 2018, she made her television debut in an Adult Swim infomercial titled "Flayaway." In 2019, Sherman opened for fellow comedian Eric André on his Legalize Everything tour. She was also a writer for The Eric Andre Show, Three Busy Debras, and Magic for Humans.

=== Saturday Night Live ===
==== Auditions ====
Sherman was asked to audition for the long-running NBC sketch-comedy show Saturday Night Live after doing a stand-up set at the Just for Laughs festival. She had previously been asked to perform some showcases for SNL producers and attempted some character-based work which, according to her, "fucking sucked." She initially auditioned for SNL in 2016, as part of a showcase at the iO Theater in Chicago that also featured Alex Moffat, who would be hired as part of the cast that year. In 2021, she auditioned again. James Austin Johnson was directly ahead of her in line, and she expressed her nervousness, but "I went into the audition with good vibes because of James and, LOL, we both got it." In the interview, she added, "I did standup. I didn't have any impressions or characters. It was disgusting, I'm talking about genitals." She was subsequently cast as a featured player for its 47th season, alongside fellow newcomers Johnson and Aristotle Athari. Before being hired by SNL, she had had trouble finding employment because her gross-out videos turned hiring managers off. Sherman found a limited audience in her first season because of COVID-19 restrictions, and the end of her second season was cut short by the 2023 Writers Guild of America strike. In 2023, Sherman was promoted to a repertory player.

==== Body horror comedy ====
At SNL, Sherman frequently collaborates with writer/film producer Dan Bulla, who joined in 2019 for Season 45, and with whom she shares an office. Among their sketches together are "Jewish Elvis," "My Best Friend's House," and "Shrimp Tower". The latter, starring host Josh Brolin, earned a Primetime Emmy Award for Outstanding Production Design for a Variety or Reality Series. Of their Christmas sketch "Pongo," featuring a "wonderfully creepy" synthetic pet, Bleeding Cool writes, "With all due respect to co-writer Bulla, this sketch had Sarah Sherman's brand of humor all over it – and it was brilliant." About a black-and-white pre-taped video suggestive of The Hunchback of Notre Dame, Sherman told Style Weekly, "I was so lucky to have immediately linked up with amazing writers who totally got it. You know, like Dan Bulla, who I write with a lot. We did this sketch called 'The Anomalous Man,' where I play this mythical creature beast with Dua Lipa, it was kind of an Elephant Man parody. When we were writing it, Bulla was like, 'Oh and by the way, you need to have a hunchback with an eyeball on it." (Note: Sherman kept the eyeball-hunchback prosthetic; Eamon Cunningham, the Head Prop Master, framed it for her. She displayed it on Late Night with Seth Meyers in 2025.)

Asked about her favorite experience with any performer, Sherman refers to her twisted, gory Scooby-Doo sketch in Season 49: "This past finale, Jake Gyllenhaal was the co-host. He's such a good actor and just willing to go there and be aggressive and crazy and chaotic and high energy... The first time he hosted, we did that sketch where I play Chucky and I appreciated anyone willing to go there." Also that year, Sherman posted on Instagram "Severed Head Count: 3." The Late Nighter website added them up in the article "Sarah Sherman's 'Severed Head' Makes Third SNL Appearance." The first time is in the parody documentary sketch "UNTOLD: Battle of the Sexes" in a critical tennis game. "That beheading came at the hand of host Jason Momoa, who knocked off her head with a (literal) breakneck serve." The second time is in the Scooby-Doo sketch, in which Sherman (playing Velma) is clotheslined by a piano wire. The third was "My Best Friend's House," in which Sherman appears as a plastic-wrapped severed head stored in the refrigerator by Ariana Grande's best friend's dad, who turns out to be a savage serial killer.

==== Weekend Update ====
Sherman's segments on Weekend Update are popular among the cast and viewers, as she torments Colin Jost, who is willing to be the butt of the joke. Sherman has said that Jost urged her to create segments for them, and she says, "I took his kindness and used it to just bully him. And it worked great, but it only worked because he's having fun." Her first foray, "Sarah Sherman Roasts Colin Jost," was listed by Mashable at #6 in their ten favorite sketches of 2021, concluding, "She nails it." She designs her own wacky over-the-shoulder graphics for the segments. Among her jokes in that roast, she asks him why there are no Jews in the cast. When he replies that there are Jews on the show, including her, she turns to the camera and yells, "In other news, local wet blanket Colin Jost is keeping track of the amount of Jews at SNL. He's making a list and he's checking it twice." In "Sarah Sherman Roasts Colin Jost Again" (2022), the premise is that she will explain how to remain cozy in the winter, but then embarrasses Jost by segueing into pubic hair, the cost of living in New York (she lives in his doghouse), and his relationship with Michael Che ("It's always will-they-won't-they with you two!"), each joke turning the topic into an extended insult to Jost.

At times, Sherman portrays other characters: television journalist Nancy Grace; the widow of Peanut the Squirrel; an alarming meditation guru in a Morgan le Fay-type wig, Genesis Fry, who reveals Jost's darkest secrets; J.J. Gordon, Jost's Hollywood agent, who suggests humiliating film projects for him, such as a Jurassic Park-themed porn film or a biopic entitled Jost the Two of Us: My Summer with Epstein; and CJ Rossitano, who is revealed to be very likely Jost's son. Wearing clothes identical to Jost's and clutching a pencil as he habitually does, CJ says: "Me and my mom live right over on 47th and Fifth." Jost: "That's funny, that's where my former housekeeper lived." CJ: "What a coincidence, Colin! My mom's a former housekeeper." Harry Chapin's father-son song "Cat's in the Cradle" rises in the background.

==== Surreal humor ====
Sherman has been praised by critics for adapting her unusual and surreal comedy style to SNL without losing its impact. Luka Katic of Collider wrote, "Sherman certainly isn't the first unconventional comedian to be featured on SNL (i.e. Tim Robinson, Kyle Mooney, etc.). However, what makes her remarkable is her success in spite of that fact. Where actors like Robinson often felt they had to tone down their material for SNL, Sherman finds inventive alternative ways to channel her deranged sensibilities into the show." Jesse Hassenger of Vulture listed Sherman's "Meatballs" sketch from the Oscar Isaac/Charli XCX episode as one of the best of the season, writing, "In a crowded season, it was especially refreshing to come upon a sketch that feels like such a clear expression of its star's sensibilities." Style Weekly wrote, "With her loud clown wear and freakish, squirrel-next-door-vibe, Sarah Sherman is hands down the funniest, most unpredictable cast member." Sherman is considered a rare representative of contemporary clowning in traditional media.

==== Props design ====
Sherman has introduced new materials to the costumes and props departments. Sherman enjoys wearing weird outfits, raiding the show's 50 years' worth of costumes and devising new ones. "I played RFK Jr.'s brain worm, and the costume department made me a couture worm [outfit]," she told an interviewer. Looking back at earlier sketches in which Dan Aykroyd and Jay Mohr faked vomiting, she developed "an advanced vomit rig that's handsfree, kind of like Bluetooth style," as she describes it. She once asked Louie Zakarian, the show's multiple-Emmy-Award-winning special-effects makeup chief, to devise a fake seagull that could be impaled in her torso while moving its legs.

In 2022, for her sketch "Eyes," Sarah delivered her performance wearing googly eyes (or wiggle eyes) which, her character explains, were "supposed to be refrigerated" but were left in the character's pockets. Zakarian adapted them so that they would allow Sherman "to see through the big eyes, read cue cards, and match it all to [her] skin." He "drilled one big hole in the back and a smaller one in the pupil part;" yet her body heat fogged up the surfaces. Zakarian said that, during the COVID pandemic, he'd discovered a fixing liquid good for certain surfaces, so he used it on the googly eyes. The fogging problem was discovered during the dress rehearsal, so he had only a few minutes to solve it. When an interviewer asked why so many of her SNL sketches feature eyeballs, she credited her grandmother: "It's an exposed organ on your head, and it's not that deep. I also have a pathological neurosis about eyeballs because growing up, my grandma had one of her eyeballs removed and I was morbidly obsessed... I have her prosthetic eye. ... She would play these practical jokes on me with it when I was 8 years old. I would wake up and come down into the kitchen for breakfast, and she would turn around with no dentures or lens in. So she just had a white orb in her face and do a jump scare on me. And that was obviously very formative!"

During an interview in which the two were experimenting with makeup effects, Zakarian said, "There are certain actors that you could put whatever you want on them and they don't transform. She just transforms." Sherman agreed: "I have kind of a 'no' face. I don't have crazy-distinct features." The Guardian listed "Eyes" as one of "the 10 best sketches from the 48th season". Since the people who write a skit also produce it, they also figure out set design and props, according to Variety. Dan Bulla says, "You talk to every department and a lot of people are like, 'Well, what should the wardrobe be?' Sarah never doesn't have an answer for those questions. She can cut to it from the germ of an idea. She can visualize every aspect of it. She's on the phone with the people who build the puppets." Bulla says Sherman talks about visual effects and color palettes: "It's that granular for her, and all of her ideas start like that."

=== Other work ===
Sherman was credited as a screenwriter for the reality comedy film sequel Jackass Forever (2022). She co-starred in the Adam Sandler comedy film You Are So Not Invited to My Bat Mitzvah (2023) and was cast as a character in downloadable content for the video game High on Life (2022). She voice acted as "Coriander Cadaverish" in the animated film Nimona (2023) and in a cameo for season 2 of Severance (2025). She is expected to star in CoComelon: The Movie, which will be released in 2027.

Since October 2023, Sherman has hosted the NTS Radio show Freakradio Emergency Hotline. Among the artists she has played on the program are Macula Dog, Doug Lussenhop, Johnny Pemberton, Clownvis Presley, Negativland, and The Residents. On September 5, 2024, Sherman began her guest starring role as dialect coach Robin Finch—for Lois Cerillo, played by Rena Sofer—in the daytime soap opera General Hospital. In 2024, she debuted as a host for the HBO Max game show Human vs Hamster.

== Influences ==
Sherman has said her comedic influences include television shows such as Seinfeld, The Nanny, The Golden Girls, Pee-wee's Playhouse, and The Ren & Stimpy Show. She told an interviewer, "I'm obsessed with Jerry Lewis... I look like Jerry!" She has cited Norm Macdonald as an influence on her SNL work: "He was a little troublemaker. I relate to him because he was never not himself." She has also said, "I am obsessed with Norm MacDonald... can you imagine being on a show with Norm MacDonald, someone who's so fearless every week, saying the craziest shit on TV and getting in trouble for it?"

When she started performing stand-up comedy, she took influences from comedians such as Todd Barry, Maria Bamford, and Kristen Schaal. In SNL history, she loves Dana Carvey's iconic sketch "Massive Head Wound Harry" (Season 17), in which Carvey wore a bloody, mangled head prosthetic which is tugged and chewed by a dog.

On Late Night with Seth Meyers in 2025, Meyers asked, "Were you somebody at a young age who was into David Lynch stuff?" Sherman answered, "I feel like he taught me, like, how to think, basically. And I'm in dream analysis and stuff because of him... I'm 15 [seeing Lynch's Blue Velvet for the first time] and I'm going, 'I guess there's, like, a dark underbelly to Americana suburbia'." When asked whether filmmaker David Cronenberg is an influence, she answered, "Yeah, one billion percent."

== Political views ==
Sherman supported Bernie Sanders in the 2020 United States presidential election. She is a member of the Democratic Socialists of America. She endorsed Zohran Mamdani in the 2025 New York City Democratic mayoral primary election. Sherman had expressed her support for Palestine and participated in a New York protest against Benjamin Netanyahu's presence at the 2026 United Nations General Assembly, holding a banner with Hannah Einbinder calling for an end to the Gaza genocide.

== Filmography ==
=== Film ===
Year	Title	Role	Notes
2016	Savasana	Yoga Girl	
2019	Holy Trinity	Miffy	
2019	Mister America	Angry Woman	
2022	Godkrusher	Minka	
2023	Nimona	Coriander Cadaverish (voice)	
2023	You Are So Not Invited to My Bat Mitzvah	Rabbi Rebecca	
2024	Rap World	Sports Authority employee	
2024	Boys Go to Jupiter	Miss Sharon (voice)	
2026	Pizza Movie	Frankie	
2026	Roommates	Dr. Schilling	
2026	Lorne	Herself	Documentary
2026	Teenage Sex and Death at Camp Miasma	Kris's agent	
2027	CoComelon: The Movie †		In production

=== Television ===
Year	Title	Role	Notes	Ref.
2020	Magical Girl Friendship Squad	Lulu (voice)	3 episodes	
2020	The Eric Andre Show	Creative consultant		
2021–present	Saturday Night Live	Herself / various	Main role	
2022	Three Busy Debras	Sarah	Episode: "The Great Debpression"	
2022	Tig n' Seek	Arcade Employee / various (voice)	Episode: "Wack E. Doodle Dandy"	
2023	Hamster & Gretel	Crimson Haste (voice)	Episode: "Crimson Haste Makes Waste/The Break-Stuff Club"	
2023	Star Trek: Very Short Treks	Mucara (voice)	Episode: "Worst Contact"	
2023	Chucky	Annie Gilpin	Episode: "Dressed to Kill"	
2024	Primos	Carmela (voice)	Episode: "Summer of Imi-Tater/Summer of Ignacio"	
2024	General Hospital	Robin Finch	2 episodes	
2024	Human vs Hamster	Herself (host)	8 episodes	
2025	Severance	Water Tower (voice)	Episode: "Hello, Ms. Cobel"	
2025	Sarah Squirm: Live + In the Flesh	Herself	HBO Special	
2026	RuPaul's Drag Race	Herself (guest judge)	Episode: "RDR Live Returns!"	
2026	Make That Movie	Super Breast (voice)	Episode: "Synthezoidian Elders"	
