= Michael Longfellow =

American actor and comedian (born 1994)

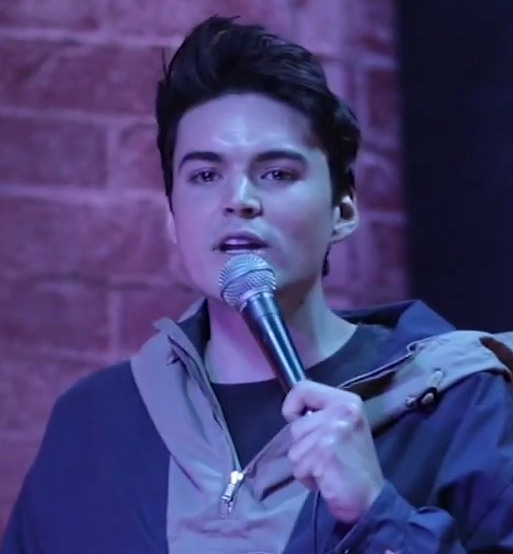
- Longfellow in 2018
- Born: January 31, 1994 (age 32); Phoenix, Arizona, U.S.
- Education: Arizona State University (BA)

Comedy career
- Medium: Stand-up; television
- Genre: Observational comedy, self-deprecation, Deadpan
- Subjects: American culture; everyday life; family; human behavior; social awkwardness; current events
- Website: www.michaellongfellow.com

Michael Longfellow (born January 31, 1994) is an American comedian and actor. He joined the cast of the NBC sketch comedy series Saturday Night Live as a featured player for its 48th season in 2022. He was promoted to being a repertory player at the start of the show's 50th season. After three years on SNL, he left the show in August 2025.

== Early life ==
Longfellow was born in Phoenix and grew up there. His mother, who is an attorney, and father later divorced. His stand-up comedy includes references to the fact that both of his parents remarried, resulting in his having stepparents.

During his first year at Arizona State University in Tempe, where he earned a BA in English literature, Longfellow started performing stand-up comedy.

== Career ==
After his 2016 college graduation, he moved to Los Angeles and began performing in comedy clubs across the country, as well as at the Netflix Is A Joke festival during its "Netflix Introducing..." showcase. He has also appeared on Conan and Bring the Funny, a reality competition series on NBC co-hosted by his future SNL colleague, Kenan Thompson.

In 2022, it was announced that Longfellow would be joining the cast of Saturday Night Live (SNL) as a featured player for its 48th season. On October 1, 2022, he made his SNL debut as a new featured cast member. In his first episode, he appeared on Weekend Update talking about relatives who are anti-vaccination and actress Sydney Sweeney’s Trump-supporting family members.

On August 28, 2025, it was reported that Longfellow had left the show, after three seasons of being a cast member. His final episode aired on May 17, 2025, with host Scarlett Johansson.

In 2026 he was in an off-Broadway play called Broken Snow at Theater 71 with Tony Danza.

== Works ==
=== Film ===
Year	Title	Role	Notes
2023	Good Burger 2	Oscar	
2025	A Very Icky Christmas	Noah	Short Film
2026	Lorne		documentary
TBA	Unsupervised	Thomas	Short Film

=== Television ===
Year	Title	Role	Notes
2018	How to Be Broke	College Kid	Episode: "Free Charger"
2019	Bring the Funny	Himself	3 episodes
2022–2025	Saturday Night Live	Himself/Various	
2024	Ghosts of Ruin	Assassin	Episode: "The Replacement"
2025	Saturday Night Live 50th Anniversary Special	Scared Straight Teenager	

=== Theater ===
	Title	Role	Notes
2026	Broken Snow		Theatre 71 Off Broadway
