= Marcello Hernández =

American comedian (born 1997)

- Hernández in 2024
- Born: Marcello André Hernández; August 19, 1997 (age 29); Miami, Florida, U.S.
- Education: Belen Jesuit Preparatory School; John Carroll University (BA)
- Occupations: Comedian; actor

Comedy career
- Years active: 2022–present
- Medium: Stand-up; television; film
- Genres: Observational comedy; sketch comedy; surreal humor; racial humor; satire
- Subjects: Latin American culture; race relations; everyday life; pop culture; embarrassment
- Website: Official website

Marcello André Hernández (born August 19, 1997) is an American stand-up comedian and actor. He has been a cast member of the NBC sketch comedy series Saturday Night Live since the show's 48th season in 2022.

== Early life and education ==
Hernández grew up in Miami, Florida, where he attended Belen Jesuit Preparatory School. His mother, Isabel Cancela, is of Cuban descent and his father, Joaquin Hernández, is Dominican. His maternal grandfather was Spanish. Hernández's parents separated before he turned five years old, and his mother later married media executive and former Miami-Dade County mayoral candidate José Cancela. He has a younger sister named Isabella and two older step-siblings through Cancela, including former Nevada State Senate member Yvanna Cancela.

In 2014, while playing for the Wolverines, Belen's boys soccer team, Hernández was named first-team, all-Miami Dade. He also trained with the U15 Dominican Republic National Team.

Hernández graduated from John Carroll University (JCU) in 2019 with a degree in entrepreneurship and communication. While at JCU, he participated in the United States Hispanic Leadership Institute, received the John J. Reardon '59 memorial scholarship for outstanding performance in theatre, and was recognized as an outstanding delegate at the Model United Nations Arab League Conference at Georgetown University.

As a freshman, he joined the JCU Blue Streaks men's soccer team in 2015 and played seven games. Hernández was positioned as a midfielder for the 2016 season but quit the team after playing three matches to pursue comedy.

== Career ==
Hernández did comedy and performed short-form pieces on social media channels, such as the weekly review and lifestyle TikTok page, "Only in Dade", which centered around the Miami lifestyle. He moved to New York City in 2019 to pursue his stand-up career. In 2022, he was selected for Just for Laughs New Face of Comedy.

In 2022, he joined the cast of the NBC sketch comedy series Saturday Night Live, becoming the show's first Gen Z cast member. He is known for playing the recurring characters including Domingo, the paramour of Kelsey, a philandering bride played by Chloe Fineman; Grant, one half of "The Couple You Can't Believe Are Together," who appears on the Weekend Update to give dating advice alongside Alyssa, played by Jane Wickline; The Movie Guy, a Weekend Update character who teases upcoming movies before admitting that he has not seen them; and Joaquín Antonio González Hernández Suárez, host of The Immigrant Dad Talk Show. In the October 5, 2024 episode, SNL featured a parody sketch of Spanish-language show Sábado Gigante, with Hernández portraying Don Francisco. The sketch received praise from Francisco, who thanked the show and Hernández "for bringing back memories of our Sábado Gigante." In November 2025, Hernández portrayed Sebastian Maniscalco in an SNL parody and was praised by Maniscalco for doing a "fantastic job."

In January 2026, Hernández released his first stand-up special, American Boy, on Netflix.

Hernández hosted the 2026 ESPY Awards, an annual sports award ceremony produced by ESPN. The ceremony took place on July 15, 2026 at the David H. Koch Theater in New York City.

== Personal life ==
Hernandez is in a relationship with Ana Amelia Batlle Cabral, a Savannah College of Art and Design and Yale graduate and architect from the Dominican Republic.

== Filmography ==
=== Film ===
Key
†	Denotes films that have not yet been released

Year	Title	Role	Notes	Ref.
2025	Happy Gilmore 2	Esteban		
2026	72 Hours	Nick		
2026	The Angry Birds Movie 3 †	TBA	Voice; in production	
2027	Shrek 5 †	Fergus	Voice; in production	

=== Television ===
Year	Title	Role	Notes	Ref.
2022–present	Saturday Night Live	Various characters		
2025	Saturday Night Live 50th Anniversary Special	Domingo, Himself	Television special, NBC	
2025	Dying for Sex	25-year-old dude	Episode: "Feelings Can Become Amplified"	
2026	American Boy	Himself	Comedy special, Netflix	

== See also ==
- List of Saturday Night Live cast members
