= James Austin Johnson =

American comedian and actor (born 1989)

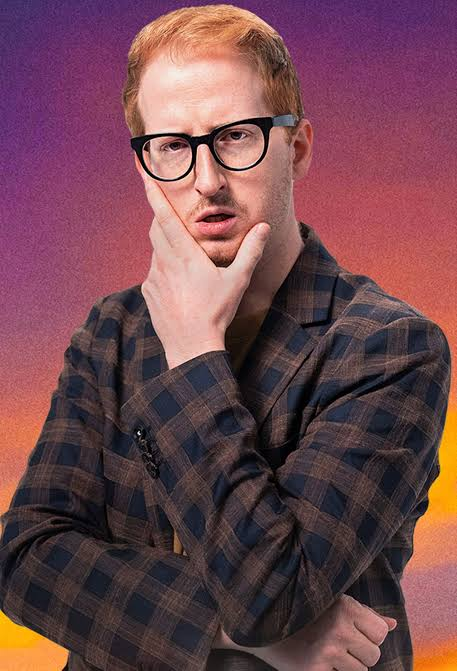
- Johnson in 2022
- Born: July 19, 1989 (age 37); Nashville, Tennessee, U.S.
- Education: Trevecca Nazarene University (BA)
- Occupations: Comedian; actor
- Years active: 2009–present
- Spouse: Rebekah Lain
- Children: 1
- Website: jamesaustinjohnson.com

James Austin Johnson (born July 19, 1989) is an American actor and stand-up comedian. He has been a cast member on the NBC sketch comedy television series Saturday Night Live (SNL) since joining as a featured player for the show's 47th season in 2021. Known for his skills as an impressionist, Johnson has impersonated both sitting U.S. Presidents during his time on SNL, playing both Donald Trump and Joe Biden. He was promoted to a repertory player in 2023.

== Early life ==
Johnson was born on July 19, 1989, in Nashville, Tennessee. As a child, he appeared in various productions by Lifeway Christian Resources. He began performing stand-up comedy as a teenager. He attended Davidson Academy and graduated from Trevecca Nazarene University in 2011. Johnson regularly performed at open mics in Nashville before moving to Los Angeles in 2013.

== Career ==
Johnson began his acting career starring in independent Christian films.

He has appeared in television series such as Adam Ruins Everything, Better Call Saul, and All Rise. In 2016, he appeared in a DirecTV television ad alongside National Football League veteran Peyton Manning.

In August 2020, Johnson's impression of U.S. President Donald Trump went viral in a video uploaded to Twitter (now X), amassing over one million views.

In 2021, Johnson was cast as a featured player on Saturday Night Live, alongside Aristotle Athari and Sarah Sherman, for its forty-seventh season. During the season premiere cold open, he portrayed U.S. President Joe Biden and later portrayed President Trump beginning in the season's fifth episode. Johnson was promoted to repertory status in 2023.

In March 2024, Deadline announced Johnson had been cast in the Bob Dylan biopic film A Complete Unknown. He voiced the character Pouchy in the 2024 Pixar animated film Inside Out 2.

Johnson released his debut stand-up comedy special, He'll Yeah, on August 31, 2026, exclusively through the Gorilla Comedy+ streaming service and released it on YouTube on September 22.

== Personal life ==
Johnson married Rebekah Elisabeth Lain in 2018. Their son, Homer, was born in 2022.

== Filmography ==
=== Film ===
Year	Title	Role	Notes	Ref.
2011	October Baby	Truman		
2012	Blue Like Jazz	Drunk Freshman		
2014	Rocket Pack Jack and the Babylon Virus	Krane		
2016	Hail, Caesar!	Studio Assistant at Action Western		
2022	She Said	Donald Trump	Voice	
2024	Inside Out 2	Pouchy	Voice	
2024	A Complete Unknown	Gerde's MC		
2025	The Running Man	Voice of Announcer		
2026	The Angry Birds Movie 3	Fuzzy	Voice	
2027	Ice Age: Boiling Point	Clarence the Sprout Master	Voice	

=== Television ===
Year	Title	Role	Notes	Ref.
2009	Alumni	Jeffry	Television film	
2009	Coffeeteria	Barrett Klausman	Miniseries	
2015	Adam Ruins Everything	Farmer Jed	Episode: "Adam Ruins Summer Fun"	
2016	The Last Tycoon	Movie Theater Usher	Episode: "Pilot"	
2017–2020	Future Man	Young Gabe Futturman	2 episodes	
2018	Better Call Saul	Fred Whalen	Episode: "Winner"	
2019	All Rise	Adam Connolly	Episode: "How to Succeed in Law Without Really Re-Trying"	
2020	Kwaczala	Dennis (Glenn)	Episode: "I am a Lion"	
2020	Robbie	Ninja Turtle	Episode: "Robbie vs. Ava vs. Danielle"	
2021	Tuca & Bertie	Kyle	Voice; 2 episodes	
2021	Squidbillies	Pharmacy Man	Voice; Episode: "One Man Banned"	
2021–present	Saturday Night Live	Various characters		
2022	Fairview	Wade Moonman, Pastor Marv	Voice; recurring role	
2022	The G Word	Various characters		
2022	Birdgirl	Ed Todd/Kaptain Khaos	Voice; Episode: "With a K"	
2023	Barry	Pastor #2	Voice; Episode: "the wizard"	
2024	John Mulaney Presents: Everybody's in LA	Bob Dylan	Voice; Episode: "Helicopters"	
2026	Saturday Night Live UK	Donald Trump	Episode: "James Norton/The Streets"	
2026	The Simpsons	Dr. De La Mañana	Voice; "Dream Scenari-Moe"	
