= Saturday Night Live TV show sketches =

Saturday Night Live has long mocked the television medium with many fake commercials and parodies of TV shows themselves. Another of the show's frequently used styles of recurring sketches has been the talk show format (e.g. "Brian Fellow's Safari Planet", "The Barry Gibb Talk Show", etc.). However, anything from cop shows to children's shows has been fair game for the ever-changing cast.

Sketches with TV show themes are listed here chronologically by order of first appearance.

- The Land of Gorch (Jim Henson) - October 11, 1975 – September 18, 1976
- The Mr. Bill Show – February 28, 1976
- Consumer Probe (Dan Aykroyd, Jane Curtin, Candice Bergen) – December 11, 1976
- E. Buzz Miller and Christie Christina (Dan Aykroyd, Laraine Newman) – January 22, 1977
- Leonard Pinth-Garnell (Dan Aykroyd) – March 12, 1977
- The Ex-Police (Dan Aykroyd, Bill Murray) – October 15, 1977
- Woman to Woman (Gilda Radner) – October 21, 1978
- Telepsychic (Dan Aykroyd) – December 9, 1978
- The Bel-Airabs (Don Novello, Bill Murray, Jane Curtin, Gilda Radner, Laraine Newman) – December 8, 1979
- What's It All About (Gilbert Gottfried, Denny Dillon) – November 15, 1980
- Mister Robinson's Neighborhood (Eddie Murphy) – February 21, 1981
- Fernando's Hideaway (Billy Crystal) – November 3, 1984
- The Limits of the Imagination (Randy Quaid) – November 9, 1985
- The Pat Stevens Show (Nora Dunn) – November 16, 1985
- The Church Lady (Dana Carvey) – October 11, 1986
- Instant Coffee with Bill Smith (Kevin Nealon) – October 18, 1986
- Miss Connie's Fable Nook (Jan Hooks, Dana Carvey, Dennis Miller, Kevin Nealon) – November 8, 1986
- Pumping Up with Hans & Franz (Dana Carvey, Kevin Nealon) – October 17, 1987
- Learning To Feel (Nora Dunn) – January 23, 1988
- Wayne's World (Dana Carvey, Mike Myers) – February 18, 1989
- Cooking with the Anal Retentive Chef (Phil Hartman) – April 1, 1989
- Tales Of Ribaldry (Jon Lovitz) – April 1, 1989
- Sprockets (Mike Myers) – April 15, 1989
- Lank Thompson (Mike Myers) – October 21, 1989
- The Dark Side with Nat X (Chris Rock, Chris Farley) – November 10, 1990
- Simon (Mike Myers) – November 10, 1990
- Daily Affirmation with Stuart Smalley (Al Franken) – February 9, 1991
- Coffee Talk with Linda Richman (Mike Myers) – October 12, 1991
- Theatre Stories (Mike Myers, Julia Sweeney, Dana Carvey) – December 14, 1991
- Sassy's Sassiest Boys (Phil Hartman) – February 6, 1993
- The Denise Show (Adam Sandler) – October 2, 1993
- Good Morning Brooklyn (Jay Mohr) – November 12, 1994
- Perspectives with Lionel Osbourne (Tim Meadows) – January 21, 1995
- Scottish Soccer Hooligan Weekly (Mike Myers, Mark McKinney) – January 21, 1995
- Leg Up (Molly Shannon, Cheri Oteri) — September 30, 1995
- The Joe Pesci Show (Jim Breuer) – December 2, 1995
- The Quiet Storm (Tim Meadows) – October 19, 1996
- Shopping At Home Network (Will Ferrell, Chris Kattan) – November 16, 1996
- Delicious Dish (Ana Gasteyer, Molly Shannon, Rachel Dratch, Alec Baldwin) – November 16, 1996
- Celebrity Jeopardy! (Will Ferrell, Darrell Hammond, Norm Macdonald, and various others) – December 7, 1996
- Goth Talk (Molly Shannon, Chris Kattan, Jim Breuer) – April 12, 1997
- Leon Phelps, The Ladies Man (Tim Meadows) – October 4, 1997
- Issues with Jeffrey Kaufman (Jim Breuer) – October 18, 1997
- Morning Latte (Cheri Oteri, Will Ferrell) – October 25, 1997
- Martha Stewart Living (Ana Gasteyer) — October 25, 1997
- The View (Cheri Oteri, Molly Shannon, Tracy Morgan, Ana Gasteyer) — November 15, 1997
- Tiger Beat's Ultra Super Duper Dreamy Love Show (Cheri Oteri, Molly Shannon, Ana Gasteyer) — January 17, 1998
- Pretty Living (Molly Shannon, Ana Gasteyer) – March 14, 1998
- Hello Dolly (Ana Gasteyer) – October 3, 1998
- The How Do You Say? Ah, Yes, Show (Chris Kattan, Jimmy Fallon) – October 17, 1998
- Dog Show (Will Ferrell, Molly Shannon) – December 5, 1998
- Pimp Chat (Tracy Morgan, Tim Meadows) – December 5, 1998
- Jarret's Room (Jimmy Fallon, Horatio Sanz) – December 16, 2000
- Wake Up Wakefield! (Maya Rudolph, Rachel Dratch, Jimmy Fallon, Horatio Sanz) – March 17, 2001
- America Undercover (Chris Kattan, Amy Poehler) – November 3, 2001
- The Ferey Muhtar Talk Show (Horatio Sanz) – March 16, 2002
- Top O' the Morning (Seth Meyers, Jimmy Fallon) – October 19, 2002
- Z105 with Joey Mack (Jimmy Fallon) — November 2, 2002
- Pranksters (Seth Meyers) – February 22, 2003
- Spy Glass (Amy Poehler, Seth Meyers) – November 1, 2003
- Appalachian Emergency Room (Seth Meyers, Chris Parnell, and various others) – January 10, 2004
- The Prince Show (Fred Armisen, Maya Rudolph) – February 14, 2004
- Besos Y Lagrimas (Fred Armisen) — February 21, 2004
- ¡Show Biz Grande Explosion! (Fred Armisen as Fericito (see 2002–2003), Horatio Sanz) – March 6, 2004
- Vincent Price's Holiday Special (Bill Hader) – November 19, 2005
- Deep House Dish (Kenan Thompson, Rachel Dratch, Andy Samberg) – November 19, 2005
- Bronx Beat (Amy Poehler, Maya Rudolph) — January 13, 2007
- La Rivista Della Televisione (Bill Hader) — March 17, 2007
- The Dakota Fanning Show (Amy Poehler) – February 3, 2007
- The Cougar Den (Amy Poehler, Kristen Wiig, Casey Wilson) – April 12, 2008
- The Lawrence Welk Show (Fred Armisen, Kristen Wiig) – October 4, 2008
- Dateline (Bill Hader) – November 22, 2008
- What Up with That? (Kenan Thompson) – October 17, 2009
- The Manuel Ortiz Show (Fred Armisen) – December 19, 2009
- The Miley Cyrus Show (Vanessa Bayer) – October 2, 2010
- J-Pop America Fun Time Now (Taran Killam, Vanessa Bayer) — October 15, 2011
- Bein' Quirky with Zooey Deschanel (Abby Elliott) — February 11, 2012
- Girlfriends Talk Show (Aidy Bryant, Cecily Strong) — November 10, 2012
- The Ellen Show (Kate McKinnon) — November 10, 2012
- Mornin' Miami! (Kate McKinnon, Bobby Moynihan) — October 5, 2013
- Waking Up With Kimye! (Nasim Pedrad, Jay Pharaoh)— November 16, 2013
- Family Feud (Kenan Thompson) — December 21, 2013
- Black Jeopardy! (Kenan Thompson) — March 29, 2014
- Hollywood Game Night (Kate McKinnon) — October 11, 2014
- The House (Kyle Mooney, Beck Bennett) — March 7, 2015
- Morning Joe (Alex Moffat, Kate McKinnon) – May 6, 2017
- Fresh Takes (Mikey Day, Alex Moffat, Kate McKinnon) – November 4, 2017
- Oops, You Did It Again (Chloe Fineman) — February 20, 2021

== See also ==
- List of recurring Saturday Night Live characters and sketches
- List of Saturday Night Live musical sketches
- List of Saturday Night Live commercial parodies
- Saturday Night Live characters appearing on Weekend Update
