= Recurring Saturday Night Live characters and sketches introduced 2013–14 =

The following is a list of recurring Saturday Night Live characters and sketches introduced during the thirty-ninth season of SNL, which began on September 28, 2013.

== Bruce Chandling ==
Kyle Mooney plays stand-up comedian Bruce Chandling, who frequently slips into bouts of melancholy about how his life has turned out, in the middle of his appearances on Weekend Update.

Season	Episode	Host	Notes
39	September 28, 2013	Tina Fey	Bruce Chandling gives his take on new Iranian President Hassan Rouhani's first UN Speech.
39	May 17, 2014	Andy Samberg	Bruce Chandling provides his perspective on summertime fun.
41	November 14, 2015	Elizabeth Banks	Bruce talks about women and his girlfriend.
41	April 9, 2016	Russell Crowe	Bruce talks about sports.
42	April 15, 2017	Jimmy Fallon	Bruce talks about Easter.
43	November 18, 2017	Chance the Rapper	Bruce talks about Thanksgiving.

An installment was scheduled to air on October 22, 2016, where Bruce talks about Halloween and brings on a fellow Comedian (Tom Hanks); the segment was cut from the episode before airing, but was released online. Two filmed pieces with Kevin Hart and Louis C.K. respectively were also cut for time in Season 40.

== Cinema Classics ==
Reese De'What (Kenan Thompson) presents classic cinema and television.

Season	Episode	Host	TV show/film lampooned
39	September 28, 2013	Tina Fey	
40	October 4, 2014	Sarah Silverman	Forgotten TV Gems: Supportive Women
40	January 31, 2015	J.K. Simmons	Casablanca
40	April 11, 2015	Taraji P. Henson	
40	May 16, 2015	Louis C.K.	Forgotten TV Gems: Whoops! I Married a Lesbian
41	April 16, 2016	Julia Louis-Dreyfus	
44	March 2, 2019	John Mulaney	To Have and Have Not
44	May 11, 2019	Emma Thompson	
45	November 23, 2019	Will Ferrell	The Wizard of Oz
46	October 31, 2020	John Mulaney	The Birds
47	January 22, 2022	Will Forte	Gaslight
49	December 16, 2023	Kate McKinnon	Meet Me in St. Louis

A further Cinema Classics sketch was set for the October 12, 2024 episode during season 50, in which host Ariana Grande would portray Judy Garland. It was canned during set construction in the live program due to cascading effects of earlier technical problems, which lead to insufficient time remaining in the program to perform it; its slot was instead filled by another, unrelated, but shorter, sketch initially dropped at dress rehearsal.

== Mornin' Miami! ==
Three surly and unusually-named news anchors of a Miami-based morning news program (played by Kate McKinnon, Bobby Moynihan, and the host) cheerfully record their promos for the week for their off-screen producer (voiced by Vanessa Bayer).

Season	Episode	Host	Notes
39	October 5, 2013	Miley Cyrus	Yolanda Natalie Portman (Miley Cyrus), Jill Amockingbird, and Bitch Fantastic seethe in between recordings.
39	January 18, 2014	Drake	Trey Shayearwood (Drake), Lena Towerapisa, and Burt Fingerblast fume over their new sign off. The producer is onscreen at the beginning of this sketch.

An installment of Mornin' Miami! was scheduled to air on May 10, 2014, featuring host Charlize Theron; the sketch was cut from the episode before airing, but was released online.

== Miss Meadows (poetry teacher) ==
Unusually perky poetry teacher Miss Meadows (Vanessa Bayer) visits students and teaches them about the joys of poetry. She reads her eccentric original poems to the group. Students take turns reading their odd original poems with one student (played by the host) using their poems to display their sexual attraction towards Meadows.

Season	Episode	Host	Notes
39	October 5, 2013	Miley Cyrus	Miss Meadows visits a class while the teacher is at a job interview.
39	January 18, 2014	Drake	Miss Meadows visits detention.
40	November 22, 2014	Cameron Diaz	Miss Meadows is a substitute teacher

== Miley tapes ==
A look in the fictional romance of Miley Cyrus and Kyle Mooney, which takes place during and after the filming of a homemade videotape. Bobby Moynihan and Beck Bennett interrupt the shooting, to which Kyle exits the room and confides in them that he doesn't really want to do what Miley wants him to do in the tape. Every time he opens the door after that, her actions and situations become more outlandish.

Season	Episode	Host	Notes
39	October 5, 2013	Miley Cyrus	Miley and Kyle make a sex tape. However, due to Kyle's reluctance, she ends up making a tape with his brother (Taran Killam) instead.
41	October 3, 2015	Miley Cyrus	Miley and Kyle make a wedding video, marry and have a child (Jon Rudnitsky), much against Kyle's wishes. At the end, time speeds up so fast that Kyle dies and becomes single again as Miley is now a widow.

== Shallon ==
A guest speaker (played by the host) visits Astoria Elementary School to give a safety presentation, but finds that the loud, brash student Shallon (Nasim Pedrad) twists his lecture into an endorsement of whatever he is warning the children against (such as getting into cars with strangers) while the class's teacher Miss Finley (Kate McKinnon) is away doing something in her car. Shallon's actions lead her classmates (played by Aidy Bryant, John Milhiser, Bobby Moynihan, Kenan Thompson, and Noël Wells) to believe that what Shallon says is right, much to the chagrin of the guest speaker. When Miss Finley returns, the guest speaker leaves and makes a negative comment about the class. Afterwards, Miss Finley gives the children permission to pursue the activity the guest speaker was attempting to discourage.

Season	Episode	Host	Notes
39	October 26, 2013	Edward Norton	Shallon convinces the class to get into vans with strangers while undermining the authority of a police officer named Officer Rosen (Edward Norton) to get candy on Halloween.
39	December 14, 2013	John Goodman	While Captain Lemkee (John Goodman) of the Irvine Fire Department talks about fire safety on Christmas, Shallon convinces the class to get into the fireplace on Christmas Eve to save Santa Claus from the fire.
39	April 12, 2014	Seth Rogen	Shallon convinces the class that they should seek out drug dealers to get crack from them while ignoring the words of D.A.R.E. member Officer Kellogg (Seth Rogen).

== Holiday Food ==
The episode's host plays an eccentric character who talks about the food they'll be giving out on a certain holiday.

Season	Episode	Host	Notes
39	October 26, 2013	Edward Norton	A father (Norton), accompanied by his wife Adult Ruth (Aidy) and their son Diego (Bobby Moynihan), shows off the candy he has bought for Halloween trick-or-treaters, including a kale chip in a Reese's Peanut Butter Cup packet, and a Pez dispenser with his own head on it.
40	April 4, 2015	Michael Keaton	Keaton (playing himself), accompanied by Portia (Kate McKinnon) and Jordan (Bobby Moynihan), shows off what he has bought for Easter, including creme eggs that he gave up for lent the year before, and a toy "Easter monkey".

A third sketch themed around Thanksgiving, starring Kristen Wiig as "Wisten Kriig", was cut for time during the Season 42 episode aired November 19, 2016. Another sketch for St. Patrick's Day, featuring Bill Hader as Liam Neeson, was also cut for time during Season 43 on March 17, 2018.

== Heshy Farahat ==
Heshy Farahat (Nasim Pedrad) is a Yemeni motivational speaker who comes to speak at schools and hotels, etc. She often tells personal stories to motivate the audience, using hip thrusts and shooting-gun sound effects controlled by her son (Mike O'Brien).

Season	Episode	Host	Notes
39	November 2, 2013	Kerry Washington	Heshy arrives at a school's career week with her son and her assistant Tammy (Kerry Washington).
39	May 10, 2014	Charlize Theron	Heshy appears at a hotel to give dating advice, "The Man Plan", with her friend Gail (Charlize Theron).

== Waking up with Kimye ==
Kanye West (Jay Pharoah) and Kim Kardashian (Nasim Pedrad) host a morning talk show with a typical daytime-talk-show format. Despite Kanye feeding Kim each of her lines to say in extremely obvious ways, she messes up most of them anyway. Kanye appears to be oblivious to Kim's ditziness, seeing her as both beautiful and brilliant. The other Kardashian sisters make giggling nasal-voiced appearances.

Season	Episode	Host	Notes
39	November 16, 2013	Lady Gaga	Kanye and Kim interview the Apple Store employee Karen (Lady Gaga) who repaired Kim's computer.
39	December 21, 2013	Jimmy Fallon	Kim shows off her gingerbread nightclub. Fallon does not appear in the sketch.
39	May 17, 2014	Andy Samberg	Kim shows off a drawing of her wedding dress. Samberg plays Kim and Kanye's wedding planner Jostin Pappick.

== Jebidiah Atkinson ==
Jebidiah Atkinson (Taran Killam), a Weekend Update character, is an 1860s newspaper critic who has something negative to say about everything.

The character was inspired by an actual incident: On November 14, 2013, in honor of the 150th anniversary of Abraham Lincoln's Gettysburg Address, The Patriot-News retracted a scathing review of the address that its predecessor publication, The Patriot & Union, had published on November 24, 1863. Atkinson, ostensibly the author of that review, appeared on Weekend Update to defend his opinion. (The actual author was Oramel Barrett.)

The character has received critical acclaim from multiple reviewers. Mike Ryan of the Huffington Post said he would watch a Jebidiah Atkinson movie. HitFix's Ryan McGee said that while performing the bit, Killam was on fire, even comparing Atkinson to Bill Hader's beloved Weekend Update character Stefon.

Season	Episode	Host	Notes
39	November 16, 2013	Lady Gaga	Jebidiah is critical of Abraham Lincoln's Gettysburg Address and other political speeches.
39	December 7, 2013	Paul Rudd	Jebidiah is critical of "A Charlie Brown Christmas" and other Christmas specials and movies.
39	March 1, 2014	Jim Parsons	Jebidiah is critical of current and past Best Picture nominees. At the end, however, he quickly exclaims "GoseetheLegoMovieit'scute!" (Killam's wife Cobie Smulders made a voice cameo as Wonder Woman in the movie).
39	May 3, 2014	Andrew Garfield	Jebidiah is critical of current and past Tony nominees.
40	January 31, 2015	J. K. Simmons	Jebidiah is critical of current and past Grammy nominees.
40	April 4, 2015	Michael Keaton	Jebidiah is critical of current and past television shows.

== Richard Patterson (Baby Boss) ==
Dick Patterson (Beck Bennett) is a businessman who exhibits infantile reflexes. He is described by those who work for him as having "the body of a baby."

Season	Episode	Host	Notes
39	November 23, 2013	Josh Hutcherson	Josh Hutcherson plays Mr. Patterson's newly hired assistant.
39	March 29, 2014	Louis C.K.	Louis C.K. plays a vice-president of Mr. Patterson's company.
40	November 22, 2014	Cameron Diaz	Cameron Diaz plays Mr. Patterson's wife, Nancy. This is the first version of the sketch not to take place in the office.
41	May 14, 2016	Drake	Drake plays a White House Representative representing Patterson as a potential third-party candidate. Here it is revealed his first name is Dick.

== Animal Hospital (Vet Office) ==
Nurses (played by Kate McKinnon, Cecily Strong, and the host) work at a vet hospital and deliver the news of the pet's death to pet owners. The host plays a flamboyant nurse.

Season	Episode	Host	Notes
39	November 23, 2013	Josh Hutcherson	
40	September 27, 2014	Chris Pratt	

== Family Feud ==
Steve Harvey (Kenan Thompson) hosts the TV quiz show of the same name.

Season	Episode	Host	Notes
39	December 21, 2013	Jimmy Fallon	Celebrity edition: CBS vs. NBC Team CBS: Jimmy Fallon as Jim Parsons Taran Killam as Ashton Kutcher John Milhiser as Jon Cryer Noel Wells as Alyson Hannigan Team NBC: Justin Timberlake as Jimmy Fallon Kate McKinnon as Jane Lynch Jay Pharoah as Ice-T Brooks Wheelan as himself
39	May 3, 2014	Andrew Garfield	Celebrity edition: American vs. International Musicians American Musicians: Andrew Garfield as Justin Timberlake Nasim Pedrad as Bruno Mars Noel Wells as Reba McEntire Kyle Mooney as Skrillex International Musicians: Kate McKinnon as Shakira Jay Pharoah as Drake Aidy Bryant as Adele Taran Killam as Russell Crowe
40	January 24, 2015	Blake Shelton	Celebrity edition: The Voice vs. American Idol The Voice: Blake Shelton as himself Taran Killam as Adam Levine Jay Pharoah as Pharrell Williams Cecily Strong as Christina Aguilera American Idol: Kate McKinnon as Keith Urban Sasheer Zamata as Nicki Minaj Beck Bennett as Harry Connick Jr. Kyle Mooney as Steven Tyler
41	October 17, 2015	Tracy Morgan	Extended Families Williams Family: Leslie Jones as Jackie Jay Pharoah as Martin Sasheer Zamata as Leila Michael Che as Raymond Williams-Magill Family: Tracy Morgan as Darryl Cecily Strong as Maria Vanessa Bayer as Rachel Jon Rudnitsky as Blake
41	March 12, 2016	Ariana Grande	Celebrity edition: Actors vs. Directors Actors: Ariana Grande as Jennifer Lawrence Kate McKinnon as Tilda Swinton Beck Bennett as Javier Bardem Jay Pharoah as Idris Elba Directors: Taran Killam as Quentin Tarantino Jon Rudnitsky as Martin Scorsese Kyle Mooney as Woody Allen Bobby Moynihan as Kevin Smith
42	October 1, 2016	Margot Robbie	Political edition Team Trump: Kate McKinnon as Kellyanne Conway Margot Robbie as Ivanka Trump Bobby Moynihan as Chris Christie Beck Bennett as Vladimir Putin Team Clinton: Darrell Hammond as Bill Clinton Melissa Villaseñor as Sarah Silverman Cecily Strong as Lin-Manuel Miranda Larry David as Bernie Sanders Cameo appearances by Mikey Day as Donald Trump Jr. and Alex Moffat as Eric Trump.
42	February 4, 2017	Kristen Stewart	Super Bowl edition Falcons Fans: Kate McKinnon as Justin Bieber Leslie Jones as Samuel L. Jackson Aidy Bryant as Paula Deen Beck Bennett as Roger Goodell Patriots Fans: Kristen Stewart as Gisele Bündchen Bobby Moynihan as Bill Belichick Alex Moffat as Casey Affleck Melissa Villaseñor as Lady Gaga
42	April 15, 2017	Jimmy Fallon	Time travel edition Team 1977: Harry Styles as Mick Jagger Cecily Strong as Liza Minnelli Sasheer Zamata as Diana Ross Jimmy Fallon as John Travolta (1977 version) Team 2017: Pete Davidson as David Blaine Melissa Villaseñor as Gwen Stefani Kate McKinnon as Kristen Stewart Jimmy Fallon as John Travolta (2017 version)
43	November 18, 2017	Chance the Rapper	Thanksgiving edition Harvey Family: Leslie Jones as Janelle Chris Redd as Mike Michael Che as Andre Gary Richardson as Ricky Didrickson Family: Aidy Bryant as Carol Beck Bennett as Peter Mikey Day as Justin Chance the Rapper as Cecil
43	March 10, 2018	Sterling K. Brown	Celebrity edition: Oscar Winners vs. Losers Oscar Winners: Kate McKinnon as Frances McDormand Beck Bennett as Guillermo del Toro Heidi Gardner as Allison Janney Chris Redd as Jordan Peele Oscar Losers: Sterling K. Brown as Common Melissa Villaseñor as Sally Hawkins Alex Moffat as Willem Dafoe Pete Davidson as Timothée Chalamet
44	February 16, 2019	Don Cheadle	Celebrity edition: Oscar Nominees The Newbies: Melissa Villasenor as Lady Gaga Kyle Mooney as Bradley Cooper Pete Davidson as Rami Malek Chris Redd as Mahershala Ali The Veterans: Don Cheadle as Spike Lee Kate McKinnon as Glenn Close Beck Bennett as Sam Elliott Cecily Strong as Olivia Colman
44	May 4, 2019	Adam Sandler	The Avengers vs. Game of Thrones The Avengers: Alex Moffat as Thor Beck Bennett as Thanos Ego Nwodim as Okoye Leslie Jones as Groot Game of Thrones: Kate McKinnon as Brienne of Tarth Mikey Day as Tormund Giantsbane Cecily Strong as Melisandre Kyle Mooney as Brandon Stark Cameo appearance by Melissa Villaseñor as Arya Stark.
50	October 12, 2024	Ariana Grande	Election Showdown Team Trump: James Austin Johnson as Donald Trump Mikey Day as Donald Trump Jr. Bowen Yang as JD Vance Team Harris: Maya Rudolph as Kamala Harris Andy Samberg as Doug Emhoff Jim Gaffigan as Tim Walz Dana Carvey as Joe Biden Cameo appearance by Chloe Fineman as Kaitlan Collins. NOTE: Cecily Strong as Melania Trump was supposed to appear in this Family Feud sketch, but she's absent when Johnson (as Trump) humorously says that she was standing right beside him "about two years ago".

An earlier version of this sketch aired in the season 35 episode hosted by Ryan Reynolds. It featured Jason Sudeikis as host Richard Dawson in a 1970s version of Family Feud between the Osmond family and the Phillips family. Another version originally aired on January 21, 1978 (Season 3) featuring Bill Murray as Richard Dawson and the Coneheads as the contestants.

== Bathroom Guy ==
A man (Jonah Hill) is called out for leaving a mess on the toilet in unlikely situations.

Season	Episode	Host	Notes
39	January 25, 2014	Jonah Hill	"Couples Quiz!" Gameshow
41	March 5, 2016	Jonah Hill	Murder Mystery Mansion

== Black Jeopardy! ==
Kenan Thompson plays Darnell Hayes, host of a version of Jeopardy! where correct responses are stereotypes of working-class African American speech and thought. Two contestants are African-American; the host plays the contestant in the rightmost seat. This third contestant is often (but not always) not African American, but believes they can still do well on the show.

Season	Episode	Host	Notes
39	March 29, 2014	Louis C.K.	Louis C.K. plays Mark, a white professor of African American Studies at Brigham Young University. Jay Pharoah and Sasheer Zamata play the other contestants, Amir and Keeley.
41	November 14, 2015	Elizabeth Banks	Elizabeth Banks plays Allison who "dated a black guy once." Jay Pharoah and Sasheer Zamata reprise their roles as Amir and Keeley. Leslie Jones plays the woman providing the Daily Double clue.
41	May 14, 2016	Drake	Drake plays a Black Canadian named Jared. Jay Pharoah and Sasheer Zamata reprise their roles as Amir and Keeley.
42	October 22, 2016	Tom Hanks	Tom Hanks plays a Donald Trump supporter named Doug. Sasheer Zamata reprises her role as Keeley. Leslie Jones plays new contestant Shanice.
43	April 7, 2018	Chadwick Boseman	Chadwick Boseman reprises his role of King T'Challa from the Marvel Cinematic Universe. Leslie Jones reprises her role as Shanice. Chris Redd plays new contestant Rashad. Cecily Strong and Beck Bennett voice a white couple shopping for real estate.
45	December 21, 2019	Eddie Murphy	Eddie Murphy reprises his Velvet Jones character. Chris Redd reprises his role as Rashad. Ego Nwodim plays new contestant Kiana.
50	February 16, 2025	50th Anniversary Special	Eddie Murphy does an impression of Tracy Morgan. Leslie Jones reprises her role as Shanice. The real Tracy Morgan plays new contestant Darius. Chris Rock appears as a "Special Guest Clue." Tom Hanks reprises his character Doug, replacing Tracy at the right side.

== Dyke and Fats ==
Trailers from a fictional CBS buddy-cop show featuring Dutch Plains (Kate McKinnon) as lesbian cop Les Dykawitz, and Velvy O'Malley (Aidy Bryant) as food-loving cop Chubbina Fatzarelli. While they call one another "Dyke and Fats" and engage in stereotypical behavior, they won't tolerate that anyone else, including superior officers, call them by their nicknames.

Season	Episode	Host	Notes
39	March 29, 2014	Louis C.K.	
42	December 10, 2016	John Cena	

== Chris Fitzpatrick ==
Kyle Mooney plays Chris Fitzpatrick, an alternative high-schooler who makes videos featuring heavy metal music and public domain images of car crashes and buildings being demolished.

Season	Episode	Host	Notes
39	March 29, 2014	Louis C.K.	Chris Fitzpatrick runs for High School President.
40	November 22, 2014	Cameron Diaz	Chris Fitzpatrick fights his high-school bully, Andy Rydell.
41	May 7, 2016	Brie Larson	Chris Fitzpatrick launches a Kickstarter campaign for his band, Discreet Annihilation.
43	March 10, 2018	Sterling K. Brown	Chris Fitzpatrick interviews people on the street on Rock vs. Rap

== Leslie Jones ==
Leslie Jones appears as an expert on image and relationships on Weekend Update and flirts with host Colin Jost.

Season	Episode	Host	Notes
39	May 3, 2014	Andrew Garfield	Leslie appears as an image expert and talks about Lupita Nyong'o being named PEOPLE's Most Beautiful Person. Her jokes about African-American slavery were met with controversy. Jones has since defended them.
40	September 27, 2014	Chris Pratt	Leslie appears as a relationship expert and talks about the benefits of being single and her relationship woes.
40	November 15, 2014	Woody Harrelson	Leslie appears to give her thoughts about a woman who got arrested after attempting to break into the house of a man she met online and got stuck in a chimney. (This was Jones' first appearance as a correspondent since joining the cast of the show a few episodes prior.)
40	December 6, 2014	James Franco	Leslie appears as a relationship expert who gives her thoughts on 420Singles.com.
40	March 7, 2015	Chris Hemsworth	Leslie talks about how much she hates New York City.
40	May 9, 2015	Reese Witherspoon	Leslie reads love letters she wrote to a guy whom she had a four-year booty call with
41	October 3, 2015	Miley Cyrus	Leslie talks about how she hates that because she is funny, men "just aren't feeling [her] like that."
41	November 7, 2015	Donald Trump	Leslie talks about how gender roles are changing in the household
41	December 12, 2015	Chris Hemsworth	Leslie talks about Breaking Bad being snubbed from the Golden Globes
41	January 23, 2016	Ronda Rousey	Leslie talks about her crush on Leonardo DiCaprio
41	February 13, 2016	Melissa McCarthy	Leslie lists what qualities she'd like to see in her perfect man. Kenan Thompson appears as her resident pianist.
41	May 14, 2016	Drake	Leslie talks about achieving your dreams at any age
42	October 22, 2016	Tom Hanks	Leslie comments on her nude photo hack which happened that August
42	December 3, 2016	Emma Stone	Leslie believes that guys should appreciate their penis more
42	January 21, 2017	Aziz Ansari	Leslie reviews the movie Hidden Figures
42	May 6, 2017	Chris Pine	Leslie talks about going on vacation in Jamaica that April
SE	August 10, 2017	n/a	Leslie talks about her love for working out and exercising.
43	November 4, 2017	Larry David	Leslie talks about the Houston Astros winning the World Series.
43	March 3, 2018	Charles Barkley	
43	May 5, 2018	Donald Glover	Leslie discusses Facebook's new dating feature.
44	December 1, 2018	Claire Foy	
44	March 9, 2019	Idris Elba	
44	May 18, 2019	Paul Rudd	

== Whiskers R We ==
Middle-aged cat-lover Barbara DeDrew (McKinnon) and her girlfriend (the episode's host) showcase the cats that are ready to be adopted at Whiskers R We animal shelter. Barbara spends each commercial highlighting each cat's ridiculous backstory (for example, one cat is described as a ghost who died in 1940, another is described as a master of psychological manipulation) and fending off her girlfriend's awkward attempts at physical affection, which she is uncomfortable with on camera.

Season	Episode	Host	Notes
39	May 10, 2014	Charlize Theron	Theron appears as Cat Muller.
40	December 10, 2014	Amy Adams	Adams appears as Ashley. Ashley was originally played by Sarah Silverman, however the sketch was cut for time from her episode.
40	May 9, 2015	Reese Witherspoon	Witherspoon appears as Purrsula.
41	February 13, 2016	Melissa McCarthy	McCarthy appears as Tabbytha.
42	November 19, 2016	Kristen Wiig	Wiig appears as Furonica.
43	November 11, 2017	Tiffany Haddish	Haddish appears as Clawdia.
45	April 25, 2020	no host	Sketch was part of SNL at Home episode.
49	December 16, 2023	Kate McKinnon	Billie Eilish appears as Paw-bree Hep-Purrn

Preceded by Recurring Saturday Night Live characters and sketches introduced 2012–13	Recurring Saturday Night Live characters and sketches (listed chronologically)	Succeeded by Recurring Saturday Night Live characters and sketches introduced 2014–15
