= Recurring Saturday Night Live characters and sketches introduced 2014–15 =

The following is a list of recurring Saturday Night Live characters and sketches introduced during the fortieth season of SNL, which began on September 27, 2014.

== Hollywood Game Night ==
A parody of the TV quiz show of the same name, with host Jane Lynch (played by Kate McKinnon) continually irritated by the cluelessness of the celebrity participants.

| Season | Episode | Host | Notes |
|---|---|---|---|
| 40 | October 11, 2014 | Bill Hader | Amber's (Vanessa Bayer) Team: Beck Bennett as Nick Offerman, Bill Hader as Al Pacino, Kristen Wiig as Kathie Lee Gifford. Tara's (Aidy Bryant) Team: Cecily Strong as Sofía Vergara, Taran Killam as Christoph Waltz, Jay Pharoah as Morgan Freeman. |
| 40 | April 11, 2015 | Taraji P. Henson | Kelly's (Vanessa Bayer) Team: Taran Killam as Vin Diesel, Aidy Bryant as Wynonna Judd, Jay Pharoah as Common. Eddie's (Kyle Mooney) Team: Beck Bennett as Nick Offerman, Cecily Strong as Marion Cotillard, Taraji P. Henson as Wanda Sykes. |

== How 2 Dance With Janelle ==
Janelle's (Sasheer Zamata) YouTube dance show is interrupted by her parents, concerned about the sexual nature of the videos and the presence of her obviously aroused friend Teddy Paskowitz (Kyle Mooney).

| Season | Episode | Host | Notes |
|---|---|---|---|
| 40 | November 1, 2014 | Chris Rock | With Chris Rock as Janelle's father. |
| 40 | April 11, 2015 | Taraji P. Henson | With Taraji P. Henson as Janelle's mother. |

== High school theater show ==
A high school theater troupe attempts to open its audience's eyes and tackle big subjects during a very self-aggrandizing play.

| Season | Episode | Host | Notes |
|---|---|---|---|
| 40 | November 22, 2014 | Cameron Diaz | |
| 40 | May 9, 2015 | Reese Witherspoon | |
| 41 | November 14, 2015 | Elizabeth Banks | |
| 41 | May 21, 2016 | Fred Armisen | |
| 42 | December 3, 2016 | Emma Stone | |

== Cathy Anne Vanderbilt ==
A chain-smoking and disheveled woman played by Cecily Strong who serves as friend and mentor to various fairy-tale characters. She transitioned to Weekend Update appearances at the beginning of season 42.

| Season | Episode | Host | Notes |
|---|---|---|---|
| 40 | December 6, 2014 | James Franco | Cathy Anne advises a bridge troll (James Franco) to ask for a kiss instead of riddles. |
| 40 | February 28, 2015 | Dakota Johnson | Cathy Anne chaperones Cinderella (Dakota Johnson) during the royal ball. |
| 42 | October 1, 2016 | Margot Robbie | |
| 42 | December 10, 2016 | John Cena | |
| 42 | May 13, 2017 | Melissa McCarthy | |
| SE | August 24, 2017 | n/a | Cathy Anne talks about the rise of Neo-Nazi sentiment |
| 43 | December 9, 2017 | James Franco | Cathy Anne discusses sexual harassment allegations against "Al Franco" (Al Franken) and Roy Moore. |
| 44 | January 26, 2019 | James McAvoy | |
| 45 | February 8, 2020 | RuPaul | |
| 46 | January 30, 2021 | John Krasinski | |
| 48 | December 17, 2022 | Austin Butler | Made as a send-off to Strong, who left the show following this episode. |

== Right Side of the Bed! ==
An Atlanta based morning talk-show presented by husband and wife Cory and Gracelynn Chisholm (Taran Killam and Cecily Strong). Awkward moments abound when the camera regularly cuts to guests pressured to be entertaining. The sketch is a spoof of the reality show Chrisley Knows Best.

| Season | Episode | Host | Notes |
|---|---|---|---|
| 40 | December 13, 2014 | Martin Freeman | The guests are local contractor Louie Dulux (Freeman), producer Emily Margine (Aidy Bryant), and singer Keith Urban (Kate McKinnon). |
| 40 | May 2, 2015 | Scarlett Johansson | The guests are caterer Daniela DeNotta DiPasquale (Johansson) and singer Hozier (Kate McKinnon). |
| 41 | November 21, 2015 | Matthew McConaughey | The guests are chef Buster Littles (McConaughey) and singer Ed Sheeran (Kate McKinnon). |

== Heather, a one-dimensional female character from a male-driven comedy ==
Cecily Strong embodies all the clichés of the female love interest during Weekend Update.

| Season | Episode | Host | Notes |
|---|---|---|---|
| 40 | December 13, 2014 | Martin Freeman | Heather talks about female roles in Hollywood films. |
| 40 | January 31, 2015 | J. K. Simmons | Heather talks about Super Bowl XLIX. |
| 41 | April 16, 2016 | Julia Louis-Dreyfus | |

== Treece Henderson and his band ==
Kenan Thompson (as vocalist Treece Henderson), Kyle Mooney (as keyboard player Brad Dates) and the episode's host (as a woodwind player who is also Treece's roommate) play a band who perform gigs at a series of lodges, hotels and dive bars, with Treece alternating between singing an energetic jazz-funk song and onstage banter that inappropriately delves into the private life of the host's character, who is reluctant to discuss a vague, but serious-sounding issue.

| Season | Episode | Host | Notes |
|---|---|---|---|
| 40 | December 13, 2014 | Martin Freeman | The band plays a Christmas gig at the Pine River Lounge. Freeman's character, Isaac Newberry, plays tenor sax. Beck Bennett and Vanessa Bayer play audience members. Also featuring Taran Killam as Roman, a mysterious enemy of Newberry |
| 43 | September 30, 2017 | Ryan Gosling | The band plays a pre-Football game gig at a Dive Bar. Gosling's character, Larry Fontanelle, plays flute. Beck Bennett and Heidi Gardner play audience members. Also featuring Leslie Jones as DuTrisha, Treece's girlfriend. Mooney's character is called Raj here. |
| 44 | October 13, 2018 | Seth Meyers | The band plays a Halloween at a Residence Inn by Marriott. Meyers's character, Jenks Stuplox, plays piccolo. Leslie Jones and Chris Redd play audience members. |
| 45 | December 21, 2019 | Eddie Murphy | Murphy's character, Spencer Newcherry, plays keytar. Mooney's character, Brad Dates, subsequently plays a digital wind instrument, referred to by Treece as a clarinet. Heidi Gardner and Mikey Day play audience members. This sketch was cut for time, but later released online. |
| 47 | May 21, 2022 | Natasha Lyonne | Lyonne's character, Cassie Marie, plays harmonica. Mooney's character, Brad Dates, subsequently plays a keyboard. Cecily Strong's character Helen is a dancer. Chloe Fineman and Bowen Yang play audience members. |

== Willie ==
Michael Che's neighbor who is an overtly optimistic man who appears on Weekend Update and is played by Kenan Thompson

| Season | Episode | Host | Notes |
|---|---|---|---|
| 40 | December 20, 2014 | Amy Adams | |
| 40 | March 28, 2015 | Dwayne Johnson | |
| 40 | May 9, 2015 | Reese Witherspoon | |
| 41 | October 17, 2015 | Tracy Morgan | |
| 41 | January 23, 2016 | Ronda Rousey | |
| 41 | May 21, 2016 | Fred Armisen | |
| 42 | November 19, 2016 | Kristen Wiig | |
| 43 | February 3, 2018 | Natalie Portman | |
| 46 | December 19, 2020 | Kristen Wiig | |

== Frida Santini ==
Weekend update character played by Kate McKinnon. She is a middle age woman who lives in Colin Jost's building and writes passive-aggressive notes to her neighbors.

| Season | Episode | Host | Notes |
|---|---|---|---|
| 40 | January 17, 2015 | Kevin Hart | |
| 41 | October 10, 2015 | Amy Schumer | |

== Hunk sketches ==
A parody of the reality TV show The Bachelor, in which a single man must find true love with a contestant of his choosing.

| Season | Episode | Host | Notes |
|---|---|---|---|
| 40 | January 24, 2015 | Blake Shelton | Farm Hunk (Shelton plays a parody of Season 19's bachelor Chris Soules) |
| 41 | January 23, 2016 | Ronda Rousey | Bland Man (Taran Killam plays a parody of Season 20's bachelor Ben Higgins) |
| 42 | January 14, 2017 | Felicity Jones | Beard Hunk (Beck Bennett plays a parody of Season 21's bachelor Nick Viall) |
| 43 | January 20, 2018 | Jessica Chastain | Car Hunk (Alex Moffat—and, briefly, Luke Null—play a parody of Season 22's bachelor Arie Luyendyk Jr.) |
| 44 | January 26, 2019 | James McAvoy | Virgin Hunk (McAvoy plays a parody of Season 23's bachelor Colton Underwood) |
| 45 | February 1, 2020 | J. J. Watt | Pilot Hunk (Watt plays a parody of Season 24's bachelor Peter Weber) |

== Riblet ==
Michael Che's high school friend, played by Bobby Moynihan. He likes to interrupt Che during Weekend Update and make fun of how easy reading cue cards is.

| Season | Episode | Host | Notes |
|---|---|---|---|
| 40 | January 24, 2015 | Blake Shelton | |
| 40 | February 28, 2015 | Dakota Johnson | |
| 40 | May 16, 2015 | Louis C.K. | |
| 41 | March 12, 2016 | Ariana Grande | |

== Totino's lady ==
An unnamed spokeswoman for Totino's (Vanessa Bayer) would do anything for her "hungry guys". But while her "hungry guys" are watching the Super Bowl, she is doing things of her own.

| Season | Episode | Host | Notes |
|---|---|---|---|
| 40 | January 31, 2015 | J. K. Simmons | The Totino's lady keeps herself entertained by a box of toys. |
| 41 | February 6, 2016 | Larry David | In a parody of The X-Files, the "hungry guys" become possessed. |
| 42 | February 4, 2017 | Kristen Stewart | In a parody of Blue is the Warmest Colour, the Totino's lady begins a lesbian relationship with a woman named Sabine (Stewart). |

== Brother 2 Brother ==
A Disney Channel sitcom based around two twin students played by Taran Killam and Chris Hemsworth. When Marky switches places in class with his much more muscular brother Matty, no one falls for it...

| Season | Episode | Host | Notes |
|---|---|---|---|
| 40 | March 7, 2015 | Chris Hemsworth | Math class |
| 41 | December 12, 2015 | Chris Hemsworth | Wrestling meet |

== The House ==
A parody of The Real World and other reality TV shows starring Beck Bennett, Kyle Mooney and the episode's host as castmembers/houseguests.

| Season | Episode | Host | Notes |
|---|---|---|---|
| 40 | March 7, 2015 | Chris Hemsworth | Also starring Taran Killam. |
| 42 | May 6, 2017 | Chris Pine | Also starring Pete Davidson. |
| 43 | January 27, 2018 | Will Ferrell | Also starring Tracy Morgan and Heidi Gardner. |

== Gerard, a former acting coach on The Jeffersons ==
Gerard, a movie director (Kenan Thompson), is convinced that the drama he is shooting will be more powerful and moving if his actors act like they're in a broad 70's sitcom.

| Season | Episode | Host | Notes |
|---|---|---|---|
| 40 | March 7, 2015 | Chris Hemsworth | Shooting of the movie Love at first scene. |
| 41 | December 19, 2015 | Tina Fey and Amy Poehler | Shooting of the movie Sarah's desire. |
| 43 | January 20, 2018 | Jessica Chastain | Shooting of the movie Justice for Ann. |

== Gemma ==
Gene Diradusio and his wife Lisa (Kenan Thompson and Vanessa Bayer) bump into a former acquaintance of Gene's, accompanied by his girlfriend, aspiring British singer Gemma (Cecily Strong). The boyfriend makes the couple uncomfortable by making relentlessly inappropriate comments about Gemma's attractiveness, while Gene is too scared to ask them to leave.

| Season | Episode | Host | Notes |
|---|---|---|---|
| 40 | March 28, 2015 | Dwayne Johnson | Dinner date. Gemma shares an extract from her single Banana. |
| 40 | May 16, 2015 | Louis C.K. | Couples retreat. Gemma briefly sings a part of her single Vacay. |
| 42 | November 5, 2016 | Benedict Cumberbatch | Bobby Flay's Steakhouse In Atlantic City. Gemma's song is called Magic. |
| 42 | May 20, 2017 | Dwayne "The Rock" Johnson | Jurassic Park River Rapids. Gemma's latest single is called Dynamite |
| 44 | December 8, 2018 | Jason Momoa | Sleigh Ride. Gene is with his new girlfriend (Leslie Jones) |
| 46 | May 15, 2021 | Keegan-Michael Key | |

== The Janet Johnson-Luna Civil Trial ==
32-year-old Janet Johnson-Luna (Cecily Strong) is prosecuted for having sex with 16-year-old student Gavin Daly (Pete Davidson). His mother (Kate McKinnon) is suing Luna on behalf of Gavin for emotional damage, but Gavin's testimony only proves how nontraumatic the experience was for him. Also featured in the sketch are Kenan Thompson as the judge, Bobby Moynihan as Gavin's father, and Beck Bennett and Aidy Bryant as reporters Bill Arnold and Paula Abbott.

| Season | Episode | Host | Notes |
|---|---|---|---|
| 40 | April 11, 2015 | Taraji P. Henson | Henson plays the prosecutor. |
| 41 | January 23, 2016 | Ronda Rousey | Teacher Kara Torkelson (Rousey) is tried alongside Janet Johnson-Luna. Taran Killam plays the prosecutor. |

== Kinky Elves ==
Elves (Kenan Thompson, Vanessa Bayer, and, in the final two skits, the episode's host) purposefully botch their jobs and gleefully wait for their master to give them the punishment they deserve and desire.

| Season | Episode | Host | Notes |
|---|---|---|---|
| 40 | May 16, 2015 | Louis C.K. | Elves work for a shoemaker (Louis C.K.) |
| 41 | December 5, 2015 | Ryan Gosling | They work for Santa (Bobby Moynihan) |
| 42 | December 17, 2016 | Casey Affleck | They work for Mrs. Claus (Aidy Bryant) |

| Preceded by Recurring Saturday Night Live characters and sketches introduced 2013–14 | Recurring Saturday Night Live characters and sketches (listed chronologically) | Succeeded by Recurring Saturday Night Live characters and sketches introduced 2015–16 |
