= Recurring Saturday Night Live characters and sketches introduced 2012–13 =

The following is a list of recurring Saturday Night Live characters and sketches introduced during the thirty-eighth season of SNL, which began on September 15, 2012.

== Puppet Class ==
Anthony Peter Coleman (Bill Hader), is a traumatized Army veteran who attends a puppeteering class with his identical puppet, Tony. Coleman reportedly served in multiple wars, including the Vietnam War and the United States invasion of Grenada. Coleman is depicted wearing aviator sunglasses, despite being indoors, and wearing a camouflage shirt, presumably from his service.

Coleman’s recounts of combat, combined with his deficiency of emotion, contrast against what should be a lighthearted puppetry class.

Season	Episode	Host	Notes
38	September 15, 2012	Seth MacFarlane	MacFarlane plays the instructor.
40	October 11, 2014	Bill Hader	

== The Girl You Wish You Hadn't Started a Conversation with at a Party ==
Cecily Strong appears on Weekend Update and provides incoherent diatribes, largely political in nature, with plenty of malaprops, while texting and rummaging in her purse.

Following the character's first appearance, TV Guide called the character "hilarious"; Entertainment Weekly labeled it "the funniest performance of the night." The sketch was the fifth most popular SNL clip on Hulu in 2012.

In an interview with Chicago Magazine, which said the character "has become a sensation", Strong said:

[The character is] a mix of a lot of people—including myself, unfortunately. But it came about when I was talking to one of the writers, Colin Jost. And I said something that sounded like a drunk-girl ramble. And we just started riffing on that. And as it turns out, I’m not the only one who’s had a conversation with this type of girl.

Strong told the State Journal-Register that the character was a favorite of hers. SNL alum Jimmy Fallon praised the character during an interview with Strong on Late Night with Jimmy Fallon.

Season	Episode	Host	Notes
38	September 27, 2012	None (Weekend Update Thursday)	
38	November 3, 2012	Louis C.K.	
38	December 15, 2012	Martin Short	
38	May 4, 2013	Zach Galifianakis	
38	May 18, 2013	Ben Affleck	Appears with other characters in the background of Stefon sketch.
40	September 27, 2014	Chris Pratt	Her first appearance since Strong became a co-anchor for season 39.
40	March 7, 2015	Chris Hemsworth	
40	May 9, 2015	Reese Witherspoon	Witherspoon also appears in the sketch as McKenzie, another Girl You Wish You Hadn't Started a Conversation with at a Party.
41	March 5, 2016	Jonah Hill	
42	October 22, 2016	Tom Hanks	
45	March 7, 2020	Daniel Craig	
50	February 16, 2025	50th Anniversary Special	Bobby Moynihan also appears in the sketch as Drunk Uncle.

== Regine ==
Regine (Fred Armisen) is a rude, pretentious woman introduced in each appearance as the host's new girlfriend. The host demonstrates to his friends how Regine goes into physical contortions of ecstasy when he touches certain parts of her body.

Season	Episode	Host	Notes
38	October 6, 2012	Daniel Craig	
38	February 16, 2013	Christoph Waltz	
41	May 21, 2016	Fred Armisen	Jason Sudeikis portrayed the boyfriend.

== Kirby ==
Bobby Moynihan plays astronaut Kirby J. Buttercream, who annoys his fellow astronauts with stories about his love for his "little kitty cat", Fuzz Aldrin. At the end of each sketch, it is revealed that he smuggled his cat on board the spacecraft.

Season	Episode	Host	Notes
38	October 6, 2012	Daniel Craig	Mission to Mars.
39	October 12, 2013	Bruce Willis	Mission to destroy an asteroid on a collision course with earth.

== Last Call (Sheila Sovage) ==
Sheila Sovage (Kate McKinnon) and a character played by the host are the final two customers at a bar, and convince themselves to hook up despite their lack of physical chemistry. Their awkward attempts at hitting on and kissing each other dismay the bartender (Kenan Thompson).

Season	Episode	Host	Notes
38	November 3, 2012	Louis C.K.	
38	April 13, 2013	Vince Vaughn	
39	December 14, 2013	John Goodman	
40	November 15, 2014	Woody Harrelson	
41	February 6, 2016	Larry David	
42	November 12, 2016	Dave Chappelle	
43	March 3, 2018	Charles Barkley	
43	May 12, 2018	Amy Schumer	First time Sovage hits on a woman.
44	May 4, 2019	Adam Sandler	Featuring Kristen Wiig as Melba Letzman-Toast.

== Girlfriends Talk Show ==
Aidy Bryant and Cecily Strong play Morgan and Kyra, the teenage hosts of "Girlfriends Talk Show." Morgan is surprised to find that Kyra has invited her new and impressively cool friend (played by the episode's host) to join them. Throughout the sketch, the new friend rudely dismisses Morgan's contributions, making Morgan increasingly insecure and upset.

"Girlfriends Talk Show" received mixed reviews from reviewers, with several crediting Bryant's performance for making it worthwhile. In discussing the sketch's first appearance, both Vulture and HitFix singled out Bryant's line, "No, you should be called Roach Wearhouse!" for special appreciation. Rolling Stone called the sketch "side-splitting." However the Huffington Post called the skit "bad" saying it was based entirely on "annoying teenage voice."

Season	Episode	Host	Notes
38	November 10, 2012	Anne Hathaway	Hathaway plays Kyra's new friend Tara.
38	January 19, 2013	Jennifer Lawrence	Lawrence plays Kyra's new friend Jessy, a punk rocker.
39	October 5, 2013	Miley Cyrus	Cyrus plays Kyra's new friend Tara Arnold aka Lil' Teeny, a hip-hop wannabe.
39	November 23, 2013	Josh Hutcherson	Hutcherson plays Morgan's crush Trevor Masterson.
39	February 1, 2014	Melissa McCarthy	McCarthy play Morgan's adult friend Donna Ruth Baker.
39	May 10, 2014	Charlize Theron	Theron plays their former drama teacher Miss Christine.
40	December 20, 2014	Amy Adams	Adams plays head of the school's dance squad Megan Carter Cosgrove, One Direction appears as the Dance Squad.
40	May 2, 2015	Scarlett Johansson	Johansson plays last year's prom queen Camden Cruthers.

== Niff and Dana ==
When two employees (Bobby Moynihan and Cecily Strong) find out at a staff meeting that someone is about to be fired, they assume it's them and use it as an opportunity to call out all their co-workers on various failings and transgressions. The host plays their manager who finally tells Niff and Dana that the fired employee is someone else.

Season	Episode	Host	Notes
38	November 10, 2012	Anne Hathaway	Niff and Dana speak out when someone is going to get fired at McDonald's. The fired employee is actually Carl (Tim Robinson).
38	March 2, 2013	Kevin Hart	Niff and Dana speak out when someone is going to get fired at Barnes & Noble. The actual fired employee is, again, Carl (Robinson).
39	November 23, 2013	Josh Hutcherson	Niff and Dana speak out when someone is going to get fired at Best Buy. Robinson was no longer in the show's cast for season 39; the fired employee turns out to be Mandrew (Taran Killam), described by Niff and Dana to have a serial killer-type look.

== The Ellen Show ==
A parody of the TV talk show of the same name, with Kate McKinnon portrays Ellen DeGeneres, while Vanessa Bayer and Nasim Pedrad play Sophia Grace and Rosie respectively.

Season	Episode	Host	Notes
38	November 10, 2012	Anne Hathaway	Hathaway portrays Katie Holmes.
39	March 1, 2014	Jim Parsons	Parsons portrays Johnny Weir.

== Maine Justice ==
Likely a spoof of TV shows that were made for one area but produced in a different one, yet they still take place in the target area (e.g., Braceface), Maine Justice is a court show airing on a public access TV station in Bangor, Maine run by Judge Marshall T. Boudreaux (Jason Sudeikis) and Jessop the Bailiff (played by the host) in which a bewildered defendant finds himself surrounded by people who repeatedly emphasize that they are in Bangor while giving every possible indication that they are in Louisiana. The characters (aside from the defendant) all have thick Cajun accents, and make many references to alligators (an alligator is also featured in the show's logo and as a live-hand puppet in the second sketch) and the bayou. In the sketch's first instance, Judge Boudreaux refers to the plaintiff's daughter going to school "up there" in Connecticut, despite being geographically incorrect, but says she could also "learn a thing down here in Maine, as well!" Judge Boudreaux and Jessop the Bailiff extol Maine as the home of jazz and Mardi Gras but correctly identify Maine as the home of Stephen King.

In both episodes, the defendant, who is not a local, inevitably loses the case and is sentenced to eat spicy or soggy Cajun food.

In the first sketch, when the confused defendant asks about the absurdity of the situation, Judge Boudreaux, Jessop the Bailiff, and the plaintiff offer possibilities like:

- They relocated to Maine after Hurricane Katrina and didn't want to change their ways
- They're "part of some kind of courtroom exchange program"
- A "space-time portal" exists between Maine and New Orleans and they're confused about which side they're on

They don't suggest which, if any, of these explanations is the truth.

Season	Episode	Host	Notes
38	December 8, 2012	Jamie Foxx	Sarah Ann Tucker (Aidy Bryant) sues Ethan Vandermark (Bobby Moynihan) for running up the utility bill in a house he rented from her where Ethan claimed that a leak in the basement was responsible. Judge Boudreaux finds in favor of the plaintiff and sentences Ethan to eat the spiciest jambalaya in town. Jamie Foxx plays Jessop the Bailiff. Charlie Day makes a cameo appearance as Congressman Finton Worthington Carey who testifies against Ethan on Sarah Ann's behalf.
38	March 9, 2013	Justin Timberlake	Lila Jean Devereaux (Kate McKinnon) sues a college student named Peter Goldstein (cameo appearance by Andy Samberg) over a traffic incident on Union Street resulting in neck injuries where he rear-ended her at the stop sign the same time when an alligator was crossing the road. During the sketch, Peter mentions that he's a graduate of LSU to which Judge Boudreaux and Jessop react with disgust and revulsion (actually antithetical to their behavior in general since being an LSU alum would most likely cast one in a favorable light with actual Louisiana residents). Judge Boudreaux finds in favor of the plaintiff and sentences Peter to eat an entire bag of the soggiest and messiest beignets in town. Justin Timberlake plays Jessop the Bailiff. A live-hand alligator puppet is used to play the alligator that entered the courtroom pretending to be a judge.

== Former Porn Star Commercials ==
Three former porn stars, two female and one male—Brecky (played by Vanessa Bayer), and Breenie (played by Cecily Strong), and a male (played by the host)—film a commercial for a luxury product, with the goal of proving they are no longer in the adult film industry.

Season	Episode	Host	Notes
38	December 8, 2012	Jamie Foxx	Swarovski crystals. The girls mispronounce "Swarovski" as "Sabosky," while Foxx calls it "Sharky Crystals." Foxx plays "Sammy Stamina."
38	March 9, 2013	Justin Timberlake	Moët & Chandon champagne. The girls call it "Moot & Chambum," while Timberlake calls it "Monica & Chandler." Timberlake plays "Ricky V. I. Penis."
38	May 18, 2013	Ben Affleck	Hermès handbags. The girls refer to the brand as "Herman's," while Affleck calls it "Herpes," and appears to initially believe that the commercial is an informational spot about that disease, but the girls clarify things for him—somewhat. Affleck plays "Girth Brooks," which, coincidentally (or not), is the name of a gay porn star.
39	September 28, 2013	Tina Fey	Manolo Blahnik shoes. The girls refer to the brand as "Manuel Blondicks," while Fey calls it "Manilow Blankets," and inexplicably associates them with Barry Manilow ("They're made from Barry Manilow. I don't know, his hair or something."). Fey plays "LeJean Noween."
39	January 25, 2014	Jonah Hill	Lamborghini automobiles. The girls refer to the brand as "Lambortini," while Hill calls it "Limbergina." Hill plays porno director "Martin Porn-Sese."
39	May 17, 2014	Andy Samberg	Bulgari watches. The girls refer to the brand as "Bivilgaggy," while Samberg calls it "Biv G. Roy." Samberg plays "Tweedle-Dee" while Kristen Wiig plays "Tweedle-Dong."
40	December 6, 2014	James Franco	Sunseeker Yachts. The girls refer to the brand as "Sunsinker Yok-its," while Franco calls it "Seersucker Yaks" and thinks the brand's central focus is dressing yaks in seersucker suits. James Franco plays "Captain Jack Swallow" and Seth Rogen appears in cameo as "Frames Janco."
40	March 7, 2015	Chris Hemsworth	Dolce & Gabbana. The girls refer to the brand as "Dole-ky and Gabbaba," while Hemsworth calls it "Douche and Go Bye-Bye." Hemsworth plays "Dong Juan De Dark Hole."
41	November 7, 2015	Donald Trump	Trump 2016. The girls pronounce "Trump" as "Tramp," while Bobby Moynihan calls him "Ronald McDonald McTrump," which is also his character's name. Cameo by Trump as himself, who manages to clarify everything that the girls and McTrump got wrong.

== Eddie ==
When a guest to his family's home makes a verbal slip-up, obnoxious son Eddie (Taran Killam) proceeds to mock the guest mercilessly.

Season	Episode	Host	Notes
38	February 9, 2013	Justin Bieber	Eddie's sister Heather (Nasim Pedrad) introduces her new boyfriend Michael (Bieber), who accidentally combines the words "glad" and "nice" into "glice." The sketch is called "Protective Brother".
39	October 12, 2013	Bruce Willis	Eddie's mother (Vanessa Bayer) introduces her new boyfriend (Willis), who accidentally combines the words "child" and "son" into "chun." The sketch is called "Protective Son".

== Olya Povlatsky ==
Russian native Olya Povlatsky (Kate McKinnon) appears on Weekend Update to describe the hellish conditions of life in her impoverished village.

Season	Episode	Host	Notes
38	February 16, 2013	Christoph Waltz	Olya discusses the Chelyabinsk meteor that exploded over Russia.
39	January 25, 2014	Jonah Hill	Olya discusses the 2014 Winter Olympics in Sochi.
39	May 3, 2014	Andrew Garfield	Olya discusses an attack on her village by Ukraine.
40	March 28, 2015	Dwayne Johnson	Olya discusses the Russian economy.
41	Nov. 14, 2015	Elizabeth Banks	Olya discusses the Russian Track and Field team's doping scandal.
41	May 14, 2016	Drake	Olya compares Donald Trump to Russian President Vladimir Putin.
42	October 15, 2016	Emily Blunt	Olya discusses internet hacking by Russians.
42	January 21, 2017	Aziz Ansari	In the episode's cold open, Olya and Vladimir Putin (a shirtless Beck Bennett) assure the American people that everything will be alright with Donald Trump as president.

== Sheila Kelly ==
Sheila Kelly (Melissa McCarthy) is an extremely rude, aggressive, and violent woman.

Season	Episode	Host	Notes
38	April 6, 2013	Melissa McCarthy	Kelly first appeared as a basketball coach at the fictional university Middle Delaware State, in a satire of the Rutgers University scandal involving coach Mike Rice Jr.
39	February 1, 2014	Melissa McCarthy	Kelly re-appeared as a congresswoman, satirizing an altercation between New York representative Michael Grimm and a reporter David LaPierre.

== 90's Dating Tips ==
Donna Fingerneck (Cecily Strong) and Jodi Cork (Kate McKinnon) host a series of instructional videos on dating etiquette in the 1990s.

Season	Episode	Host	Notes
38	April 6, 2013	Melissa McCarthy	
40	November 1, 2014	Chris Rock	

Preceded by Recurring Saturday Night Live characters and sketches introduced 2011–12	Recurring Saturday Night Live characters and sketches (listed chronologically)	Succeeded by Recurring Saturday Night Live characters and sketches introduced 2013–14
