= Recurring Saturday Night Live characters and sketches introduced 2011–12 =

The following is a list of recurring Saturday Night Live characters and sketches introduced between September 24, 2011, and May 20, 2012, the thirty-seventh season of SNL.

== J-Pop America Fun Time Now ==
Michigan State University students Jonathan Cavanaugh "san" (Taran Killam) and Rebecca Stern-Markowitz "san" (Vanessa Bayer) present a campus TV show based on their obsession with, and profound misunderstanding of, Japanese pop culture. Their Japanese studies professor and reluctant faculty advisor Mark Kaufman (Jason Sudeikis) is less than enthusiastic about the show, pointing out that the hosts are not speaking actual Japanese and are the worst students in his class. Unfortunately, he has no choice because he has to be present in order for the show to happen. When accused of racism, Jonathan points out his Japanese girlfriend (Fred Armisen, who thought he was Japanese- but found out he is actually 1/4 Korean).

In an interview with Vulture, Bayer said she did not think the J-Pop sketch was racist:

We're obviously making fun of a certain kind of person that loves that culture so much and is sort of ignorant about it. That's why we have [Jason Sudeikis] there to put us in our places a bit. It's certainly not meant to be racist. I hope the majority of people don't think of it that way.

Reception to the sketch has been mixed, with several reviewers growing weary by its fourth appearance. Ryan McGee of HitFix said: "I used to love this sketch, but at this point, I would rather see a digital short involving Jason Sudeikis' horrified professor after a taping of this show. I think they've milked this as far as it can go." The Huffington Post's Mike Ryan felt similarly, writing, "We got the joke a long time ago. Most recurring sketches try to develop personalities for its characters. Unfortunately, when the gist of the joke is, 'These two are doing something offensive and they don't realize it,' it's hard to give them meaningful personalities." However, Vulture's Joe Reid said, "In classic SNL fashion, it's the one-joke premise stretched out over countless repetitions, but I am so fond of Taran Killam and Vanessa Bayer, I could watch them bounce around to that theme song all day." Hillary Busis wrote for Entertainment Weekly that "It’s been long enough since the sketch last appeared for Bayer’s anime eyes, Killam’s wig, and the pair's cultural insensitivity...to be amusing again."

Rob Bricken of Topless Robot called the skit "a 100% accurate recreation of the most obnoxious portion of anime fandom".

Appearances

Season	Episode	Host	Notes
37	October 15, 2011	Anna Faris	Faris appears as an anime fanatic.
37	December 10, 2011	Katy Perry	Perry appears as a Hello Kitty fanatic.
37	March 10, 2012	Jonah Hill	Hill appears as a samurai sword collector.
38	December 8, 2012	Jamie Foxx	Foxx appears as a gi salesman.

== Lord Wyndemere ==
Lord Cecil Wyndemere (Paul Brittain) is a 47-year-old man dressed like an 18th-century fop, who prances around and desires "sweets". He is loved by his girlfriend's father (Jason Sudeikis) and hated by others, such as his girlfriend's brother Steven (Andy Samberg).

Following the January 31, 2012 announcement that Brittain was departing the show immediately, several sources expressed disappointment that there would be no further appearances by Lord Wyndemere, whom Entertainment Weekly called "wonderfully weird."

Appearances

Season	Episode	Host	Notes
37	October 15, 2011	Anna Faris	
37	January 7, 2012	Charles Barkley	

== Getting Freaky with Cee-Lo Green! ==
As Cee-Lo Green, Kenan Thompson hosts a talk show to help people with their sex lives. The show also features Bill Hader as "Colonel Nasty."

Season	Episode	Host	Notes
37	November 5, 2011	Charlie Day	
37	February 4, 2012	Channing Tatum	

== We're Going to Make Technology Hump ==
Andy Samberg and a female co-host host a television show devoted to acting out pornographic vignettes using various technological devices as the characters (e.g., an iPad as a wealthy hotel guest who recognizes his chambermaid, a video game controller, as a downtown callgirl).

Both the first and second appearances of the sketch were well received. Calling it "so-stupid-its-funny", Katla McGlynn of The Huffington Post wrote: "The funny part is the dialogue, which is so soap opera-y and over the top that it sounds hilarious coming from an iPad or a curling iron in a tiny yet dramatic bedroom set. Not to mention the notion that this could actually be a show, or that it would be hosted by friendly, upbeat young people and not some creepy techno-file." On the sketch's return, Sarah Devlin of Mediaite noted that "the production values were much higher this time around! I thought perhaps the joke would have worn thin, but then I laughed my head off...They've still got it!" Wired's Angela Watercutter wrote, "'Technology Hump' shouldn’t be funny. It's only mildly amusing when kids make G.I. Joe and Barbie play doctor, so having a beeper and a Nintendo Entertainment System gun engage in a beach rendezvous should be just plain weird. But when it incorporates the age-old trick of making a digital numeric screen spell out "80085" it's just too hard not to laugh."

Season	Episode	Host	Notes
37	November 12, 2011	Emma Stone	
37	February 11, 2012	Zooey Deschanel	

== Drunk Uncle ==
Drunk Uncle (Bobby Moynihan), real name Dale Norway, appears on Weekend Update to deliver a rambling monologue deriding the culture of the day, in particular young people, food, and technology. In each sketch, he complains about people not dressing up for a particular event. Each sketch also features Drunk Uncle singing one or more poorly-rendered songs, rambling on about things, Seth Meyers insisting he's too drunk, and Drunk Uncle making one or more politically incorrect statements toward minorities or immigrants. Drunk Uncle is a stereotypical middle-aged blue-collar American (an exterminator by trade) who is married with an extensive family. Originally written by Colin Jost, an earlier prototype of the character was inspired by Moynihan trying to make his friend Chris Gethard laugh.

The Huffington Post wrote in November 2012 that "Moynihan provides the perfect vessel for the spirit of avuncular alcoholism...He covers every aspect of your typical drunk uncle, including 'back in my day' folksy-isms, a luddite cynicism of all modern technology and quaint anti-immigration rants, all of which inevitably give way to mournful laments on his own failures in life." Moynihan later created a plot for a potential Drunk Uncle movie, in which the character would save the world from aliens, in addition to quitting alcohol.

Moynihan told Newsday that Drunk Uncle "is probably the funnest [of his characters] to do right now, by far, just because the process of writing it is the funnest part in the world." Moynihan co-writes the Drunk Uncle appearances with Colin Jost.

In December 2012, Moynihan appeared as Drunk Uncle with Seth Meyers at 12-12-12: The Concert for Sandy Relief.

Season	Episode	Host	Notes
37	December 3, 2011	Steve Buscemi	
37	January 7, 2012	Charles Barkley	
37	April 7, 2012	Sofia Vergara	
38	September 20, 2012	None (Weekend Update Thursday)	
38	November 10, 2012	Anne Hathaway	
38	April 7, 2013	Melissa McCarthy	Special appearance by Peter Dinklage as Drunk Uncle's brother-in-law, "Peter Drunklage."
38	May 18, 2013	Ben Affleck	Appears with other characters in the background of Stefon sketch.
39	September 28, 2013	Tina Fey	Aaron Paul appeared in cameo as "Meth Nephew".
39	December 14, 2013	John Goodman	Goodman appears as "Drunker Uncle".
39	May 10, 2014	Charlize Theron	
40	October 25, 2014	Jim Carrey	
41	November 7, 2015	Donald Trump	
42	May 20, 2017	Dwayne Johnson	Final regular appearance of Drunk Uncle, due to Moynihan leaving the show.
48	October 29, 2022	Jack Harlow	Special guest appearance.
50	February 16, 2025	50th Anniversary Special	Drunk Uncle appears as the partner of The Girl You Wish You Hadn't Started a Conversation with at a Party.
52	October 31, 2026	Inde Navarrette	Special guest appearance to celebrate the Milwaukee Brewers winning the 2026 World Series. Featuring appearances from Christian Yelich, Brice Turang and Pat Murphy as themselves.

== Janet Peckinpah ==
Bobby Moynihan plays a woman who seduces celebrities. Moynihan has said Janet is one of his favorite characters.

Appearances

Season	Episode	Host	Notes
37	February 4, 2012	Channing Tatum	Janet picks up Tom Brady (Tatum) at a bar, on the night before the Super Bowl.
38	January 26, 2013	Adam Levine	Janet brings Levine (as himself) back to her apartment after a concert.

A Janet Peckinpah sketch was scheduled to air on May 3, 2014; the sketch was cut from the episode before airing, but was released online. The sketch featured Janet bringing host Andrew Garfield back to her apartment after the premiere of The Amazing Spider-Man 2.

== Bein' Quirky with Zooey Deschanel ==
Abby Elliott portrays Zooey Deschanel hosting a talk show from her kitchen. Her sidekick is Michael Cera, played by Taran Killam. The theme of the talk show is to interview "quirky girls", a trait which Deschanel herself is stated, within the sketches, to exemplify (as evidenced by playing the theme song on a ukulele and randomly meowing at the viewers shortly afterward). Zooey and her guests have pointed to Mayim Bialik and Björk as exceptionally quirky girls that they look up to as role models.

Appearances

Season	Episode	Host	Notes
37	February 11, 2012	Zooey Deschanel	Deschanel appears as Mary-Kate Olsen. Kristen Wiig appears as Björk.
37	April 7, 2012	Sofia Vergara	Vergara appears as Fran Drescher. Mayim Bialik (Andy Samberg) and her Blossom costar Joey Lawrence (Fred Armisen) endorse a spot for Old Navy.

== How's He Doing? ==
Kenan Thompson leads a panel discussion of African-Americans reviewing Barack Obama's performance as President of the United States. The other panelists are Ebony writer Ronny Williams (Jay Pharoah) and a third panelist played by the host. They conclude with "What Would it Take?", in which the panelists assess what it would take for President Obama to lose their support.

Season	Episode	Host	Notes
37	February 19, 2012	Maya Rudolph	Rudolph appears as news analyst Althea Davis and they cover issues regarding the president's unfulfilled promises since his election.
39	November 2, 2013	Kerry Washington	Washington appears as businesswoman Alice Roger Smith. The panel discusses topics like the NSA wire-tapping scandal and the troublesome start for Obamacare.
40	November 1, 2014	Chris Rock	Rock (as himself) and the cast discuss once again President Obama.

== B108 FM ==
Richard (Taran Killam) and The Buffalo (Bobby Moynihan) host a 5:00 morning zoo radio show in Shakopee, Minnesota. Vanessa Bayer appears as the station's serious news reporter, "Karen" whom the hosts call "MC Jigglebutt" and attempt to get her to rap the news, much to her chagrin.

Season	Episode	Host	Notes
37	March 4, 2012	Lindsay Lohan	Lohan appears as "Illiterate Lisa."
38	January 19, 2013	Jennifer Lawrence	Lawrence appears as intern "Miss Busty Rhymes" (who can't make a rhyme to save her life).

== The Californians ==
A soap opera parody featuring Fred Armisen, Bill Hader, Kristen Wiig, and others as wealthy blondes with valley girl accents (Valspeak) exaggerated almost to the point of incoherence. Each "episode" opens with the Soapnet logo and Bill Hader's voice-over announcement: "Next on The Californians." The title sequence shows the pouring of a glass of white wine and some beach front property, with an acoustic guitar lick and chords that are reminiscent of America's "Ventura Highway" on the soundtrack.

Armisen's character, Stuart, owns the house in which the action occurs. His wife Karina (Wiig) is unfaithful (she is said to have died in a car crash when Wiig left the show). Hader plays Devin, a romantic rival and antagonist to and long lost brother of Stuart; a recurring line is Stuart's "Devin? What are you doing here?" Vanessa Bayer appears as a Latina maid, Rosa, the only brunette character. Kenan Thompson occasionally shows up as a party-goer and friend of Stuart and is also an escaped convict.

Every installment includes three scenes, generally involving unexpected guests such as a doctor, a private detective, a runaway, or a lost family member. Stuart will invite them to sit down on the furniture, which he describes precisely (e.g., "Mexican country-style chairs", "burlap and cane daybed", or "neutral-toned fruit-wood chairs"). After a shocking revelation typical to soap operas, such as an unexpected pregnancy, the camera zooms in on each character, who displays open-mouthed astonishment. Each scene ends with all of the characters in the room crowded around a single mirror and gazing at their own reflections.

Throughout the melodramatic plot developments, much of the dialogue consists of descriptions of routes taken from place to place, normally due to 'carmageddon', or heavy traffic. "Stay off the 405!" is a common phrase. Freeways are referred to with the definite article, as in "the 10", a usage characteristic of Southern California English. The characters are often seen with white wine or hors d'oeuvres such as nachos and avocado.

Armisen wrote the sketches for "The Californians" with James Anderson, and says they originated from casual conversations between Armisen, Hader, and Thompson: "Just for no reason, we would talk about how we were just in L.A. and what roads we were on, and we'd be talking about directions, and, 'Well, yeah, you go on Vermont and you make a left.'" Anderson added the soap opera element. Armisen claimed to make a significant effort to ensure the navigation they describe is accurate, relying on both his memory and Google Maps; in response to an error pointed out by The Huffington Post, he said, "The fact that you called me out on the Umami Burger...I was really hoping that it wouldn't happen, but I was happy that it happened!"

Josh Brolin, who starred in the first sketch as Stuart's doctor, told Seth Meyers that Hader and Armisen originally rehearsed "at the round table. They never actually asked Lorne to do it. And because I'm the staunch Californian, they were like, 'This is the perfect time to bring it up.'"

In 2012, LA Weekly reported that a Stanford University research project on Californian accents "suggests that 'The Californians' might be on to something." The story quoted a Stanford grad student describing something called the "California vowel shift": "If you try to think about what you think a surfer or a skater or a valley girl talks like, and do it, you can feel your mouth feels different. And I think that has to do a lot with the way that the vowels are shifting." At a SXSW Q&A panel, Armisen said that to do "The Californians" accent: "You have to pronounce every single consonant and vowel." According to Hader, the accents were not originally so pronounced, but Armisen spontaneously changed his almost to the point of incoherence the first time the sketch aired live.

Season	Episode	Host	Notes
37	April 14, 2012	Josh Brolin	"Stuart has cancer": Karina and Devon flirt and kiss, but Stuart arrives home and interrupts them. Brolin plays Greg, Stuart's doctor, who announces that Stuart has cancer.
37	May 19, 2012	Mick Jagger	"Stuart's Dad": Jagger plays Timothy, Stuart's long-lost father. Andy Samberg and Abby Elliott appear; Steve Martin cameos as a man suffering from amnesia.
38	October 13, 2012	Christina Applegate	"Wedding": Applegate plays Brie, Stuart's new fiancée, who has a shopping addiction. Taran Killam, Jason Sudeikis, Kate McKinnon, and Bobby Moynihan have parts. Cameo appearance by Usain Bolt.
38	November 17, 2012	Jeremy Renner	"Thanksgiving": Renner plays Craig, Stuart's lawyer. Stuart learns of family members he had not known about. Tim Robinson, Nasim Pedrad, Killam, and Thompson have roles.
38	February 9, 2013	Justin Bieber	Cecily Strong appears as Gia, Stuart's date, who turns out to be Devon's wife. Bieber plays a runaway teen.
38	May 11, 2013	Kristen Wiig	Estranged wife Karina (Wiig) shows up disguised as gardener Brad, makes out with Devon, then reveals she is still alive. She offers everyone agave margaritas. Maya Rudolph appears in a cameo to reveal that Stuart has a second family in Marina Del Rey.
40	February 15, 2015	40th Anniversary Special	The sketch features Bradley Cooper as Craig the pool boy, Betty White as Aunt Lana, Taylor Swift as cousin Allison, Laraine Newman as Karina's mother (Sherry the Valley Girl), Kerry Washington as the doctor, and Kenan Thompson. The sketch was mashed up with David Spade reprising his role from the "Total Bastard Airlines" sketch, with Cecily Strong taking the role of Helen Hunt.
43	March 17, 2018	Bill Hader	In Hader's monologue as host, the crew provided him with a quick-change of costume into Devon's clothes, and the sketch immediately followed. Episode "Replacing Rosa": Devon is showing the new maid, or 'estate manager', Marie (Kate McKinnon), around and reveals that Rosa (Bayer) had been deported. Stuart (Armisen) holds a party to celebrate his athleisure wear launch, but it is interrupted when a man from Encino (Pete Davidson) reveals himself as Rosa and Devon's long lost son, who is confused by their unusual accents.

Preceded by Recurring Saturday Night Live characters and sketches introduced 2010–11	Recurring Saturday Night Live characters and sketches (listed chronologically)	Succeeded by Recurring Saturday Night Live characters and sketches introduced 2012–13
