= Front-facing camera comedy =

Comedy genre

Front-facing camera comedy is a comedic genre filmed on the front-facing camera of smartphones in which performers deliver in-character monologues while directly facing the camera, sometimes playing multiple roles. Early iterations of front-facing camera comedy went viral on Vine in the early 2010s, and now frequently appear on TikTok, Twitter, and Instagram. Notable practitioners include Cole Escola, Chloe Fineman, and Megan Stalter, the latter of whom has referred to the genre as "solo improv". While it has become a defining form for some comedians, others use it to workshop material that will eventually be polished for use on more traditional platforms.

The COVID-19 pandemic resulted in the closure of live comedy venues and a subsequent "pivot" to front-facing camera comedy. In March 2020, New York Times critic Jason Zinoman declared it "the dominant comedy form" of the pandemic.
