= Jon Rudnitsky =

American comedian and actor (born 1989)

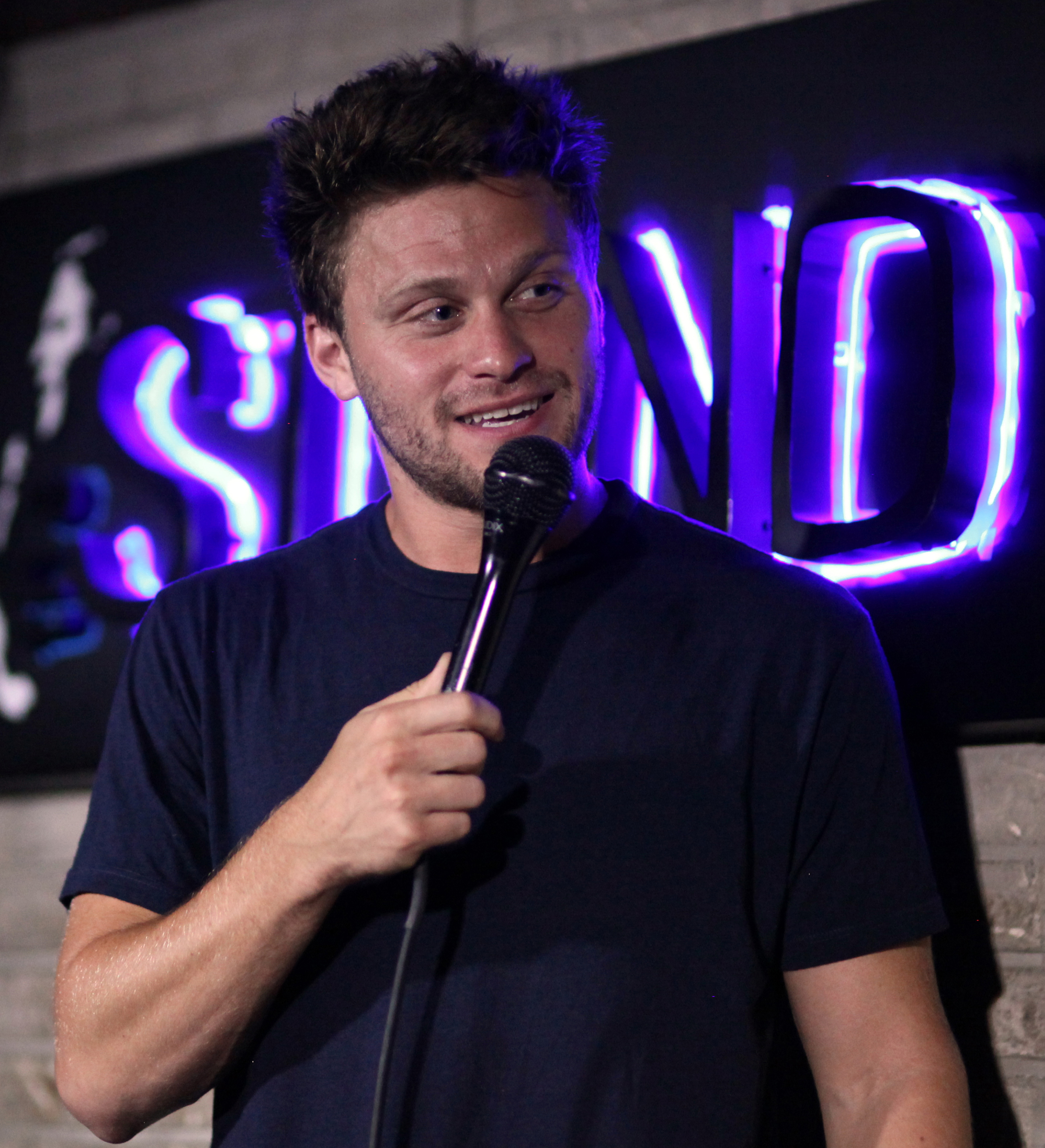
- Rudnitsky performing in July 2016
- Born: November 22, 1989 (age 36); Harrington Park, New Jersey, U.S.

Comedy career
- Years active: 2011–present
- Medium: Stand-up, film, television

Jon Rudnitsky (born November 22, 1989) is an American comedian and actor. First breaking through as a performer with the Los Angeles comedy troupe The Groundlings, Rudnitsky garnered widespread attention for his brief stint as a cast member on the NBC sketch comedy series Saturday Night Live during the show's 41st season between 2015 and 2016. Since his departure from SNL, he has also played McWatt in the 2019 miniseries Catch-22.

== Early life ==
Rudnitsky is a native of Harrington Park, New Jersey. His mother, Karen, is a social worker at The Valley Hospital in Ridgewood, New Jersey, and his father, Steven, is a businessman in the hospitality industry.

Rudnitsky attended Northern Valley Regional High School at Old Tappan. He subsequently studied acting at the University of Southern California. His maternal uncle is Michael Oren, the former Israeli Ambassador to the United States. Rudnitsky is Jewish.

== Career ==
Rudnitsky performed with the Groundlings. On August 31, 2015, it was announced that Rudnitsky would join the cast of Saturday Night Live as a featured player for the show's 41st season. In the third episode of that season, Rudnitsky portrayed Anderson Cooper in a sketch, acting as moderator for a Democratic presidential debate, for which he received criticism from Cooper. He has also done impressions of Wolf Blitzer, John Mayer, Martin Scorsese, Tom Cruise, and Vladimir Putin (in a dress rehearsal sketch on the season 41 episode hosted by Donald Trump), while also doing a Dirty Dancing sketch for Weekend Update, which was seen as one of his high points for the season. On August 9, 2016, it was reported that Rudnitsky would not be returning to the show for the following season.

In 2017, Rudnitsky starred alongside Reese Witherspoon in the romantic comedy film Home Again. In 2018, he played Mike in the Netflix release Set It Up.

He starred alongside Jane Lynch and Genevieve Angelson in the NBC pilot Relatively Happy, which was not picked up.

In March 2020, Rudnitsky was cast as Mike Devries in the musical comedy-drama television series The Big Leap, which premiered on Fox on September 20, 2021.

== Filmography ==
=== Film ===
Year	Title	Role	Notes
2014	Two-Bit Waltz	The Boy	
2015	Clint Howard Reboots Pippi Longstocking with Milla Jovovich and Fred Willard	Assius	Short film
2015	Patchwork	Lance	
2017	Home Again	George	
2018	Summer Days, Summer Nights	Mello	
2018	Set It Up	Mike	
2018	Nobody's Fool	Benji	
2020	All My Life	Chris (Bartender)	
2023	The Young Wife	Dave	
2023	Under the Boardwalk	Jimmy	Voice
2023	Wish	Dario	Voice
2024	I Love You Forever	Lucas	
2024	Stealing Pulp Fiction	Jonathan	
2024	Red One	Influencer at Mall	
2024	Our Little Secret	Cameron	
2026	Super Troopers 3	TBA	Post-production

=== Television ===
Year	Title	Role	Notes
2012	Criminal Minds	Kyle Owens	Episode: "Perennials"
2013	JewDate	Jake	Episode: "Jenga!"
2015–2016	Saturday Night Live	Various	Featured player
2017	Better Briefs	Kyle	Episode: "Locked Out in Your Underwear"
2017	Red Oaks	Brett	Episode: "Paroled"
2017	Curb Your Enthusiasm	Waiter	Episode: "Namaste"; uncredited
2017	Relatively Happy	Henry Pepper	TV pilot
2018	Champions	Asher	Recurring role
2018	Big Hero 6: The Series	Ned Ludd (voice)	3 episodes
2019	Catch-22	McWatt	Miniseries
2021	The Big Leap	Mike	Main role
2021	Curb Your Enthusiasm	Asa	Episode: "Irma Kostroski"
2022	Jurassic World Camp Cretaceous	Cyrus (voice)	Guest role: Season 5
