= Saturday Night Live season 41 =

Season of television series

Saturday Night Live
- Season 41
- No. of episodes: 21

Release
- Original network: NBC
- Original release: October 3, 2015 – May 21, 2016

Season chronology
- ← Previous season 40 Next → season 42

The forty-first season of the NBC comedy series Saturday Night Live premiered on October 3, 2015, during the 2015–2016 television season. The season premiered on October 3, 2015, with host & musical guest Miley Cyrus and concluded on May 21, 2016 with host Fred Armisen and musical guest Courtney Barnett.

Kate McKinnon won the Primetime Emmy Award for Outstanding Supporting Actress in a Comedy Series for her work in this season.

== Cast ==
After two consecutive seasons with higher-than-average levels of cast turnover, no major changes occurred prior to this season. The entire cast of the previous season returned, with Beck Bennett, Colin Jost, Kyle Mooney and Sasheer Zamata being promoted to repertory status, while Michael Che, Pete Davidson and Leslie Jones remained featured players.

Prior to the start of the season, comedian Jon Rudnitsky of the Groundlings joined the show as a featured player.

This would be the final season for longtime cast members Taran Killam and Jay Pharoah, who had both been on the show since 2010, and the only season for Rudnitsky.

=== Cast roster ===
**Repertory players**

- Vanessa Bayer
- Beck Bennett
- Aidy Bryant
- **Colin Jost**
- Taran Killam
- Kate McKinnon
- Kyle Mooney
- Bobby Moynihan
- Jay Pharoah
- Cecily Strong
- Kenan Thompson
- Sasheer Zamata

**Featured players**

- **Michael Che**
- Pete Davidson
- Leslie Jones
- Jon Rudnitsky

bold denotes "Weekend Update" anchor

== Writers ==
Before the beginning of the season, six new writers joined the staff: Upright Citizens Brigade performers Fran Gillespie, Sudi Green, and Will Stephen; former Late Show with David Letterman writers Paul Masella and Chris Belair; and stand-up comedian Dave Sirus.

Colin Jost, a cast member on the show and anchor of Weekend Update, who has also served as a writer since 2005 (and as co-head writer in 2012), stepped down as co-head writer, although he remained on the writing staff. Rob Klein and Bryan Tucker continued as co-head writers.

This would be the final season for writers Zach Kanin and Tim Robinson (Kanin had been with the show for five years since 2011; while Robinson lasted three seasons as a writer, initially starting in 2013, and overall was with the show for four years, as having briefly been joined the cast for the 2012-13 season).

This was also Klein's final season as head writer (a role he held for three seasons, previously beginning in 2013), but would return to the show the next season as a regular writer. This was also the only season for Sirus, Masella, and Belair in the writing staff.

== Episodes ==
No. overall	No. in season	Host(s)	Musical guest(s)	Original release date	Ratings/ Share
788	1	Miley Cyrus	Miley Cyrus	October 3, 2015	4.5/11
Miley Cyrus performs "Karen Don't Be Sad" and "The Twinkle Song".; Hillary Clinton (alongside Kate McKinnon's impersonation of her) and Darrell Hammond appear as Val and Bill Clinton, respectively, in "Hillary Clinton Bar Talk". Additionally, Clinton also introduces Cyrus's first musical performance.; The Flaming Lips appears as Cyrus' backing band for her first performance.; Kenan Thompson introduces Cyrus' second musical performance.; Jon Rudnitsky's first episode as a cast member.
789	2	Amy Schumer	The Weeknd	October 10, 2015	3.9/10
The Weeknd performs "The Hills" with Nicki Minaj and "Can't Feel My Face", and also appears on Weekend Update during a bit titled "The Weeknd Update".
790	3	Tracy Morgan	Demi Lovato	October 17, 2015	4.2/11
Demi Lovato performs a medley of "Cool for the Summer" and "Confident" for their first set and "Stone Cold" for their second, also appearing in "Astronaut Jones".; This was Tracy Morgan's first major comedy appearance since suffering head injuries from a near fatal car crash.; Alec Baldwin and Larry David appear in the cold open as Jim Webb and Bernie Sanders, respectively.; Baldwin, Tina Fey, Jane Krakowski, Jack McBrayer, and Morgan all reprise their 30 Rock roles in the opening monologue. Fey also appeared on Weekend Update.; Fey and Tim Herlihy received writing credits for this episode.
791	4	Donald Trump	Sia	November 7, 2015	6.6/16
Sia performs "Alive" and "Bird Set Free".; Larry David returns as Bernie Sanders in the cold open. David also appears as himself in the opening monologue.; Darrell Hammond reprises his Trump impersonation in the opening monologue.; Trump's daughter Ivanka appears in "White House 2018", receiving no audience applause.; Martin Short appears as Ed Grimley in "Hotline Bling".; The choice of Trump was controversial and a number of Latino groups petitioned to have his invitation to host rescinded.; Trump's hosting was filed with the Federal Communications Commission in regard to the equal-time rule. Although no candidate has ever requested an appearance on Saturday Night Live due to equal-time, concerns were raised over whether SNL qualified for an exception to the rule as a live entertainment program.
792	5	Elizabeth Banks	Disclosure	November 14, 2015	4.0/10
Disclosure performs "Magnets" with Lorde and "Omen" with Sam Smith.; Mike O'Brien appears in the pretaped sketch "Uber for Jen".; Cecily Strong begins the show with a tribute to France in light of the November 2015 Paris attacks, speaking both English and French. In addition, the SNL logo in the bumpers is colored blue, white, and red, the colors of the French flag. The stage lights after Sam Smith's performance and before Lorde's are also in those same colors.
793	6	Matthew McConaughey	Adele	November 21, 2015	4.6/12
Adele performs "Hello" and "When We Were Young".; J. J. Abrams, Daisy Ridley, John Boyega, Emma Stone, Michael Bublé, and Jon Hamm appear in the pre-recorded "Star Wars Audition".
794	7	Ryan Gosling	Leon Bridges	December 5, 2015	4.1/10
Leon Bridges performs "Smooth Sailin'" and "River".; Mike Myers appears in the opening monologue.; A photo is dedicated to SNL wardrobe person Jenna Krempel before the goodbyes.
795	8	Chris Hemsworth	Chance the Rapper	December 12, 2015	3.8/10
Chance the Rapper, backed by The Social Experiment, performs "Somewhere In Paradise" with Jeremih and "Sunday Candy" with Jamila Woods.; Will Ferrell appears in the cold open as George W. Bush.
796	9	Tina Fey & Amy Poehler	Bruce Springsteen & the E Street Band	December 19, 2015	5.1/13
Bruce Springsteen & the E Street Band perform "Meet Me in the City" and "The Ties That Bind" and are later joined by Paul McCartney and the cast for "Santa Claus is Comin' to Town".; Darrell Hammond portrays Donald Trump in the cold open, replacing Taran Killam (who himself appears as Ted Cruz) and appears in the goodnights singing "Santa Claus is Comin' to Town" with the cast.; Maya Rudolph appears in "StarVista" and reprises her role as Jodi Deitz on "Bronx Beat".; Gayle King and Amy Schumer appear in the pre-recorded "Amy and Tina's Dope Squad" segment.; This was the first time an episode had featured multiple hosts since 2004. Tina Fey and Amy Poehler received a historic Emmy co-nomination for Outstanding Guest Actress in a comedy for their roles as co-host of the Christmas episode, which they ultimately won.
797	10	Adam Driver	Chris Stapleton	January 16, 2016	3.0/15 in 18-49 (approximately 5.7 overall)
Chris Stapleton performs "Parachute" and "Nobody to Blame"; Darrell Hammond again plays Trump in the cold open.; Fred Armisen appears to pay tribute to David Bowie who had died six days earlier. A clip of Bowie performing "The Man Who Sold the World" from season 5 is then shown.; Liev Schreiber appears in a pre-recorded Golden Globes sketch.; The show was delayed for viewers on the East Coast for 45 minutes due to the NFC Divisional Playoff game between the Green Bay Packers and the Arizona Cardinals going into overtime.
798	11	Ronda Rousey	Selena Gomez	January 23, 2016	5.0/12
Selena Gomez performs a medley of "Good for You" and "Same Old Love" for her first set and "Hands to Myself" for her second. She also appears in the opening monologue and "Bland Man".; Darrell Hammond and Tina Fey appear as Donald Trump and Sarah Palin, respectively, in the cold open.
799	12	Larry David	The 1975	February 6, 2016	5.1/12
The 1975 performs "The Sound" and "Love Me".; Bernie Sanders appears as a passenger in "Steam Ship" and helps introduce The 1975's first song.; Ben Stiller and Owen Wilson appear as their characters, Derek Zoolander and Hansel McDonald from the movie Zoolander, respectively, on Weekend Update.
800	13	Melissa McCarthy	Kanye West	February 13, 2016	4.4/11
Kanye West performs "Highlights" (preceded by "Low Lights") with The-Dream, El DeBarge, Kelly Price, Young Thug, and ASAP Bari and "Ultralight Beam" with The-Dream, Kelly Price, Chance the Rapper, and Kirk Franklin. He, The-Dream, El DeBarge, Kelly Price, and Young Thug also appear in a pre-recorded Kyle Mooney film, "Kyle vs. Kanye".; In the same pre-recorded film, West also performs "I Love Kanye" from his album, The Life of Pablo.; Darrell Hammond appears as Bill Clinton in the cold open.; Von Miller appears as himself on Weekend Update.; Natalie Morales, Dylan Dreyer, and Al Roker appear in the pre-recorded Kyle Mooney film, "Kyle vs. Kanye".
801	14	Jonah Hill	Future	March 5, 2016	4.0/10
Future performs "Low Life" with the Weeknd and "March Madness" and appears in the opening monologue and in a Weekend Update segment called "News from the Future".; Darrell Hammond and Jason Sudeikis appear as Donald Trump and Mitt Romney, respectively, in the cold open.
802	15	Ariana Grande	Ariana Grande	March 12, 2016	4.0/10
Ariana Grande performs "Dangerous Woman" and "Be Alright".; Darrell Hammond and Larry David appear as Donald Trump and Bernie Sanders, respectively, in the cold open. David also introduces both of Grande's musical performances.
803	16	Peter Dinklage	Gwen Stefani	April 2, 2016	4.0/10
Gwen Stefani performs "Make Me Like You" and "Misery" and appears in "Mafia Meeting".; Darrell Hammond appears as Donald Trump in the cold open.
804	17	Russell Crowe	Margo Price	April 9, 2016	4.0/10
Margo Price performs "Hurtin' (On the Bottle)" and "Since You Put Me Down".; Al Sharpton appears as an analyst in the PoliticsNation with Al Sharpton sketch.; An image of Merle Haggard, who had died three days earlier, is shown in silence following Price's first performance; also, Price's guitar strap has "Margo" stitched in the same style as "Merle" was on some of his guitars.; Mike O'Brien and Jason Sudeikis appear in the pre-recorded short film Oprah: A Life of Love.
805	18	Julia Louis-Dreyfus	Nick Jonas	April 16, 2016	3.9/10
Nick Jonas performs "Close" with Tove Lo and "Champagne Problems". Additionally, Jonas appears in "Huge Jewelry" and the pre-recorded "Pool Boy".; Larry David appears in the cold open as Bernie Sanders, with Louis-Dreyfus reprising her Seinfeld role as Elaine Benes.; Louis-Dreyfus' Veep co-star Tony Hale appears in the opening monologue.
806	19	Brie Larson	Alicia Keys	May 7, 2016	4.1/10
Alicia Keys performs "In Common" and "Hallelujah".; Dana Carvey and Darrell Hammond appear in the Church Chat cold open, as the Church Lady and Donald Trump respectively.; The mothers of Pete Davidson, Brie Larson, and Kate McKinnon appear during the monologue. Davidson's mother also appears during Weekend Update.
807	20	Drake	Drake	May 14, 2016	3.9/10
Drake performs "One Dance" and "Hype".; Darrell Hammond appears as Donald Trump in the cold open.; Chris Rock introduces Drake's first performance.; Aidy Bryant introduces Drake's second musical performance.
808	21	Fred Armisen	Courtney Barnett	May 21, 2016	3.7/10
Courtney Barnett performs "Nobody Really Cares If You Don't Go to the Party" and "Pedestrian at Best".; Larry David and Kate McKinnon appear in the cold open as Bernie Sanders and Hillary Rodham Clinton drinking together in a bar. David also appears in "High School Theater Show" and "Harkin Brothers".; Andy Samberg appears as Conner4real in the SNL Digital Short and in "Harkin Brothers".; Jason Sudeikis appears in "New Girlfriend" and "Harkin Brothers".; Maya Rudolph appears on Weekend Update as Dilma Rousseff and in "Harkin Brothers".; Armisen's Portlandia co-star Carrie Brownstein appears in "Harkin Brothers".; Taran Killam, Jay Pharoah and Jon Rudnitsky's final episode as cast members

== Specials ==
Title	Original release date	US viewers (millions)
"SNL Goodnight Sweet Prince"	April 23, 2016	4.5/11
A selection of Prince's performances on the show were shown in honor of his death earlier that week. Included were his performances during the season 6 episode hosted by Charlene Tilton, the 15th Anniversary Special, the season 31 episode hosted by Steve Martin, and the season 40 episode hosted by Chris Rock, as well as a performance of "Let's Go Crazy" during the after-party for the 40th Anniversary Special, which has not been aired on television before. It also included replays of the recurring sketch "The Prince Show", where Fred Armisen played Prince and Maya Rudolph played Beyoncé. Included were sketches from the season 30 episodes hosted by Queen Latifah and Robert De Niro, the season 31 episode hosted by Steve Martin, and the season 32 episode hosted by Shia LaBeouf. The performances were introduced by Jimmy Fallon who hosted this special.
