= Saturday Night Live season 45 =

Season of television series

Saturday Night Live
- Season 45
- No. of episodes: 18

Release
- Original network: NBC
- Original release: September 28, 2019 – May 9, 2020

Season chronology
- ← Previous season 44 Next → season 46

The forty-fifth season of the NBC sketch comedy series Saturday Night Live (also branded Saturday Night Live 45 and SNL45) premiered on September 28, 2019, during the 2019–20 television season with host Woody Harrelson and musical guest Billie Eilish, and concluded on May 9, 2020 with host Kristen Wiig and musical guest Boyz II Men. This season featured the return of Eddie Murphy as host, on December 21, 2019, for the first time in 35 years. Murphy's episode was the most watched episode since 2008.

Due to the COVID-19 pandemic, the season was temporarily halted on March 16, 2020. The move came hours after New York City Mayor Bill de Blasio ordered all theaters in the city to close by the following morning. The season resumed on April 11, 2020 with three remotely produced episodes containing Weekend Update and other contributions from the cast. The self-filmed episodes, with pre-recorded from-home segments, were instead referred to as Saturday Night Live at Home. The first remote episode was hosted by Tom Hanks, after being diagnosed with COVID-19 the month prior. The third of these episodes, airing on May 9, 2020 and hosted by longtime former cast member Kristen Wiig, served as the show's season finale.

== Cast ==
Prior to the beginning of the season, longtime cast member Leslie Jones, who joined the cast one month into season 40 in October 2014, left after having been with the show for almost five full seasons. Three new featured players were announced on September 12, 2019: impressionist and writer Chloe Fineman of the Groundlings, stand-up comedian Shane Gillis, and SNL staff writer Bowen Yang. Yang is the first fully East Asian-American cast member in the show's history. Fineman had auditioned for the show previously and been unsuccessful.

The choice of Gillis as a cast member generated backlash after podcast clips of him making racist remarks were reposted. Gillis has also made derogatory remarks about Muslims, women, and the LGBTQ community on his online show Matt and Shane's Secret Podcast. Gillis was let go from the cast only four days after the announcement of his hiring, prior to the airing of the first episode. Five years later, in 2024, Gillis controversially hosted the show in the twelfth episode of season 49, during which he jokingly referenced his firing from the show. Later that year (early in the show's 50th season), executive producer Lorne Michaels revealed that he was not happy about the decision, and that NBC forced him to fire Gillis.

Heidi Gardner and Chris Redd, both of whom joined the cast in 2017 for season 43, were upgraded to repertory status this season, while Ego Nwodim, who had been hired in 2018 for season 44, remained a featured player. Pete Davidson took a leave of absence at the beginning of the season, missing the first two episodes before returning for the third, due to filming commitments of The Suicide Squad. Despite this, he was still credited in the episodes he missed.

=== Cast roster ===
**Repertory players**

- Beck Bennett
- Aidy Bryant
- **Michael Che**
- Pete Davidson
- Mikey Day
- Heidi Gardner
- **Colin Jost**
- Kate McKinnon
- Alex Moffat
- Kyle Mooney
- Chris Redd
- Cecily Strong
- Kenan Thompson
- Melissa Villaseñor

**Featured players**

- Chloe Fineman
- Ego Nwodim
- Bowen Yang

bold denotes "Weekend Update" anchor

== Writers ==
Prior to the start of the season, it was announced that Dan Bulla, Emma Clark, Dan Licata, and Jasmine Pierce were added to the writing staff. Michael Che, Colin Jost, and Kent Sublette remained as head writers for the show.

This was the final season for longtime writer James Anderson (who joined the writing staff in 2000).

== Episodes ==
No. overall	No. in season	Host	Musical guest	Original release date	Ratings/ Share
872	1	Woody Harrelson	Billie Eilish	September 28, 2019	4.1/10
Billie Eilish performs "Bad Guy" and "I Love You" with Finneas O'Connell.; Eilish's performance of "Bad Guy", inspired by a dance performed by Fred Astaire in the 1951 film Royal Wedding, was controversial, with some dancers accused Eilish of "cribbing".; Alec Baldwin and Liev Schreiber appear as Donald Trump and himself, respectively, in the cold open.; Larry David and Maya Rudolph appear as Bernie Sanders and Kamala Harris, respectively, in "Impeachment Town Hall".; Towards the end of "Inside the Beltway", a stagehand is captured by the camera coming on stage to help Aidy Bryant with a costume change. This causes Bryant and Strong to break character.; When this episode was rebroadcast on August 29, 2020, following the conclusion of Weekend Update, a photograph of Chadwick Boseman, who had previously hosted SNL and had died earlier in the week after battling cancer, was shown in silence.; Pete Davidson does not appear in this episode due to filming commitments for The Suicide Squad, but is credited in the opening sequence.; Neal Brennan and former SNL staff writer Dave McCary guest-wrote on this episode.; During the goodnights, Harrelson thanks Greta Thunberg while wearing a t-shirt with her picture on it.; Chloe Fineman and Bowen Yang's first episode as cast members.
873	2	Phoebe Waller-Bridge	Taylor Swift	October 5, 2019	4.0/11
Taylor Swift performs "Lover" and "False God" with SNL bandleader Lenny Pickett on sax.; Matthew Broderick appears as Mike Pompeo in the cold open.; Heidi Gardner and Melissa Villaseñor are both credited in the opening montage but they did not appear in this episode, although they only appear in goodbyes.; Pete Davidson does not appear in this episode due to filming commitments for The Suicide Squad, but is credited in the opening montage and mentioned by both Mikey Day and Colin Jost during Weekend Update.
874	3	David Harbour	Camila Cabello	October 12, 2019	3.8/11
Camila Cabello performs "Cry for Me" and "Easy".; Woody Harrelson, Lin-Manuel Miranda and Billy Porter appear as Joe Biden, Julian Castro and himself, respectively, in the cold open.; Lorne Michaels appears in the opening monologue.; SNL writers Dan Licata and Streeter Seidell appear as a robber and Cookie Monster, respectively, in the pre-recorded "Grouch".; Pete Davidson returns to the show after having been absent the previous two episodes.
875	4	Chance the Rapper	Chance the Rapper	October 26, 2019	3.8/11
Chance the Rapper performs "Zanies and Fools" and "Handsome" with Megan Thee Stallion.; For the first song, Chance the Rapper introduces himself (referring to himself in the third person) with a video of his daughter filling the gap between the announcement and the beginning of the song.; Alec Baldwin, Darrell Hammond and Fred Armisen appear as Donald Trump, Bill Clinton and Recep Tayyip Erdoğan, respectively, in the cold open.; Jason Momoa appears in "Judge Barry" and introduces Chance the Rapper's second performance.
876	5	Kristen Stewart	Coldplay	November 2, 2019	4.1/11
Coldplay performs "Orphans" and "Everyday Life".; SNL writer and future cast member Andrew Dismukes appears in the monologue as an audience member.
877	6	Harry Styles	Harry Styles	November 16, 2019	3.9/10
Harry Styles performs "Lights Up" and "Watermelon Sugar".; Jon Hamm appears as William B. Taylor Jr. in the cold open and introduces Styles' second performance.; Kate McKinnon, Aidy Bryant and Cecily Strong introduces Styles' first performance.; Dave McCary and Julio Torres guest wrote this episode.; After Weekend Update, a photo of former NBC executive Rick Ludwin, who died earlier in the week, is shown in silence.
878	7	Will Ferrell	King Princess	November 23, 2019	4.3/14
King Princess performs "1950" and "Hit the Back".; Alec Baldwin appears as Donald Trump in the cold open.; Tracy Morgan and Ryan Reynolds appear in the opening monologue. Additionally, Reynolds appears as Guy Who Knows the Owner on Weekend Update.; Fred Armisen, Larry David, Rachel Dratch, Woody Harrelson and Maya Rudolph appear as Michael Bloomberg, Bernie Sanders, Amy Klobuchar, Joe Biden and Kamala Harris, respectively, in "Democratic Debate" sketch. Additionally, Armisen and Rudolph appear in "First Thanksgiving" sketch.; Pete Davidson is credited in the opening montage but he did not appear in this episode.; Ego Nwodim was credited in the opening montage but she did not appear in this episode, although she was on stage during the goodnights.
879	8	Jennifer Lopez	DaBaby	December 7, 2019	4.2/11
DaBaby performs "Bop" and "Suge", both featuring Jabbawockeez, and appears in "Hip Hop Carolers".; Alec Baldwin, James Corden, Jimmy Fallon and Paul Rudd appear in the cold open as Donald Trump, Boris Johnson, Justin Trudeau and Emmanuel Macron, respectively.; The Rockettes appear in the opening monologue.; Alex Rodriguez appears in the pre-recorded "Chad & JLo".
880	9	Scarlett Johansson	Niall Horan	December 14, 2019	4.0/11
Niall Horan performs "Nice to Meet Ya" and "Put a Little Love on Me", and appears in "Hot Tub".; With this episode, Scarlett Johansson becomes the third woman to host the show more than five and tie with Drew Barrymore and Tina Fey as the most SNL's frequent female host.
881	10	Eddie Murphy	Lizzo	December 21, 2019	6.7/16
Lizzo performs "Truth Hurts" and a holiday-themed remix of "Good as Hell", and appears in the pre-recorded cut-for-time "Aidy Bizzo and Lizzo".; Fred Armisen, Alec Baldwin, Larry David, Rachel Dratch, Maya Rudolph and Jason Sudeikis appear in the cold open as Michael Bloomberg, Donald Trump, Bernie Sanders, Amy Klobuchar, Kamala Harris and Joe Biden, respectively the "PBS Democratic Debate" cold open. Rudolph also appears in the prerecorded "Family Christmas".; Chris Rock, Dave Chappelle, and Tracy Morgan appear in the opening monologue with longest-tenured cast member Kenan Thompson.; Kate McKinnon plays her two impressions during the "PBS Democratic Debate" cold open Sen. Elizabeth Warren and Nancy Pelosi.; SNL writer Gary Richardson appears on Weekend Update as a cue-card holder.; Usher appears during the goodnights.; Murphy reprises some of his most iconic SNL characters including Mr. Robinson (Mister Robinson's Neighborhood), Buckwheat (The Masked Singer), Gumby (Weekend Update) and Velvet Jones ("Black Jeopardy").; Except for his brief appearance on the Saturday Night Live 40th Anniversary Special in 2015, this episode marked Murphy's first appearance on SNL since he hosted in the tenth season 35 years earlier.; Each of the three times, Eddie Murphy has been hosted the Christmas show of the particular seasons of the show.; Eddie Murphy & Lizzo become the 11th set of returning host and rookie musical guest to headline the SNL Christmas show.; An average of 9.921 million viewers watched the show live but including seven+ DVR numbers, the show totaled 16.3 million viewers, making it the highest watched episode since 2008.; Eddie Murphy won his first ever Emmy Award for hosting this episode; Maya Rudolph won an Emmy Award for her portrayal of Kamala Harris on this episode and Don Roy King won an Emmy Award for directing this episode. In total, this episode received six Emmy Award nominations and four Emmy Award wins.; This marked the final SNL episode of 2019, as well as the final episode of SNL to air in the 2010s.
882	11	Adam Driver	Halsey	January 25, 2020	3.8/11
Halsey performs "You Should Be Sad" and "Finally // Beautiful Stranger" and appears in the pre-recorded "Slow" and the Cheer sketch.; Jon Lovitz appears in the cold open as Alan Dershowitz.; Following Weekend Update, a photo of Buck Henry, who hosted the show ten times between 1976 and 1980, is shown in silence in commemoration of his death earlier in the month.; Pete Davidson is credited in the opening montage but he did not appear in this episode.; This marked the first SNL episode of the new decade 2020.; For the 7th time, SNL booked a returning host and returning musical guest to kicked off a New Year.
883	12	J. J. Watt	Luke Combs	February 1, 2020	4.1/11
Luke Combs performs "Lovin' On You" and "Beer Never Broke My Heart".; Alec Baldwin appears in the cold open as Donald Trump.; During the goodnights, Watt and some of the cast members wore several Los Angeles Lakers jerseys showing Kobe Bryant's #24 number with Watt tossing a crumpled piece of paper off stage (à la shooting a basketball), as a tribute to Bryant who died a week earlier from a helicopter crash, a day after the previous episode.
884	13	RuPaul	Justin Bieber	February 8, 2020	4.3/12
Justin Bieber performs "Yummy" and "Intentions" with Quavo.; Larry David, Rachel Dratch and Jason Sudeikis appear in the cold open as Bernie Sanders, Amy Klobuchar and Joe Biden, respectively. Fred Armisen appears in pre-recorded footage as Michael Bloomberg.; Melissa Villaseñor did not appear in this episode; however she is credited in the opening montage and appear only in goodbyes.; This episode premiered on Cecily Strong's 36th birthday.
885	14	John Mulaney	David Byrne	February 29, 2020	4.0/12
David Byrne performs "Once in a Lifetime" and "Toe Jam" with the cast of the Broadway show American Utopia and appears in "Airport Sushi" as "The Baggage Handler Who Tosses Everyone's Suitcase Into Long Island Sound".; Fred Armisen, Larry David and Rachel Dratch appear in the cold open as Mike Bloomberg, Bernie Sanders and Amy Klobuchar, respectively. Additionally, Mulaney appears as Joe Biden (replacing Jason Sudeikis and Woody Harrelson).; Justin Theroux appears in the pre-recorded Kyle Mooney film.; Jake Gyllenhaal appears in "Airport Sushi" as "Guy Who Always Travels In Pajamas".; Mulaney's monologue generated controversy after he joked about the assassination of Julius Caesar by senators in reference to Donald Trump, causing him to be investigated by the Secret Service two days after the episode premiered. The investigation, however, was dismissed in December 2020, after they found out that Mulaney did not made any direct threats towards Trump.
886	15	Daniel Craig	The Weeknd	March 7, 2020	4.1/11
The Weeknd performs "Blinding Lights" and "Scared to Live", the latter with Oneohtrix Point Never.; The audio from the performance of "Scared to Live" was later included on a remixes EP of the Weeknd's After Hours.; The Weeknd also appears in two sketches: the pre-recorded "On the Couch", and on Weekend Update in a segment called "The Weeknd Update."; Darrell Hammond and Senator Elizabeth Warren (alongside Kate McKinnon's impersonation of her) appear in the cold open as Chris Matthews and herself, respectively.; Rachel Dratch makes an appearance reprising her role as Debbie Downer in "Wedding Reception".; Pete Davidson is credited in the opening montage, but he did not appear in this episode.

=== Saturday Night Live at Home ===
On March 16, 2020, it was announced that due to the COVID-19 pandemic, the episodes that were to air March 28, April 4, and April 11 were cancelled, with reruns shown in place of the first two. John Krasinski and Dua Lipa had been announced as host and musical guest for March 28 episode; both were rescheduled to the following season. The Strokes were scheduled to perform on the April 11 episode to promote their new album The New Abnormal; they were rescheduled to the following season. During her monologue in the 46th season, Issa Rae said she was supposed to have hosted the show "back in March". Both Aidy Bryant and Kate McKinnon's plans to leave at the end of the season were disrupted by the COVID-19 pandemic; they stayed for two additional seasons, and left in 2022.

The show resumed on April 11 in a new format in compliance with the CDC-mandated "sheltering in place" requirements. Cast members appeared remotely from their homes via video conferencing. The new format for the show became known as Saturday Night Live at Home.

No. overall	No. in season	Host	Musical guest	Original release date	Ratings/ Share
887	16	Tom Hanks	Chris Martin	April 11, 2020	4.6
Chris Martin performs a cover of Bob Dylan's "Shelter from the Storm".; The first episode of SNL to debut after the show's hiatus in response to the COVID-19 pandemic. Due to New York's covid-related stay-at-home order, the episode was not broadcast live and instead featured various sketches filmed remotely from the cast members' homes.; Tom Hanks' role as host is limited. He only appears in the opening monologue, introduces Chris Martin, and delivers the goodnights.; Larry David appears as Bernie Sanders in "A Message from Bernie Sanders".; Alec Baldwin makes a vocal appearance as Donald Trump on Weekend Update.; Fred Armisen appears in "Whatcha' Cookin' On" and the tribute to Hal Willner.; During the remote version of Weekend Update, Michael Che gave a brief tribute to his grandmother, who had died from COVID-19 the week before this show.; Rachel Dratch, Tina Fey, Ana Gasteyer, Bill Hader, John Mulaney, Paula Pell, Amy Poehler, Maya Rudolph, Adam Sandler, Molly Shannon and Emily Spivey appear in the tribute to the show's long-time music producer Hal Willner, who died from COVID-19.
888	17	none credited (Note: While some sources listed Brad Pitt as the host for the episode, he was not formally credited as such.)	Miley Cyrus	April 25, 2020	4.0
Miley Cyrus performs a cover of Pink Floyd's "Wish You Were Here" with Andrew Watt on guitar.; Unlike most episodes of SNL, this episode does not feature an on-air credited host, monologue, or goodnights. This is the first episode without an on-air credited host since the season 10 premiere on October 6, 1984.; Brad Pitt appears as Anthony Fauci in the cold open. (Note: In an interview two weeks prior to the show, Dr. Fauci jokingly agreed with the interviewer that Pitt would be a good choice for portraying him.) (Note: Pitt briefly breaks character to thank the real Dr. Fauci and the health care professionals who have been working the front line in the battle against the COVID-19 pandemic. For the conclusion of the cold open, instead of delivering the typical "Live from New York, it's Saturday Night!" line, Pitt delivers it as "Live, kind of, from all across America, it's Saturday Night".) Pitt also introduces Cyrus' performance, a role normally reserved for the show's host.; Fred Armisen, Charles Barkley, DJ Khaled, and Jason Sudeikis appear in "What Up with That", with Barkley and Khaled appearing as themselves and Armisen and Sudeikis reprising their roles as Giuseppe and Vance, respectively. A still image of Bill Hader as Lindsey Buckingham also appears in the sketch.; Adam Sandler and Rob Schneider appear in "Stuck in the House".; Judd Apatow, Nathan Fillion, Tan France, John Mulaney, Annamarie Tendler, and members of Sandler's and Pete Davidson's families make non-speaking appearances in the same sketch.; Bad Bunny appears as "Big Bunny" in "Big Papi Cooking Show".; Paul Rudd appears as himself in "FaceTime with Rudd".
889	18	Kristen Wiig	Boyz II Men featuring Babyface	May 9, 2020	3.7
Boyz II Men and Babyface perform "A Song for Mama".; Alec Baldwin appears in the cold open as Donald Trump.; Martin Short appears in "Zoom Catch-Up".; Josh Gad and Al Roker appear in "Let Kids Drink".; Danny Trejo appears in "Danny Trejo Song".; Tituss Burgess and Yvette Nicole Brown appear in non-speaking roles in "Zoom Church".; Tina Fey appears on Weekend Update.; After "Lighthouse Keeper", a still photo of Little Richard, who died earlier in the day, is shown in silence.

== Specials ==
Title	Original release date	Ratings/ Share
"A Saturday Night Live Mother's Day"	May 10, 2020	0.5/2
A special showing of all Mother's Day-themed sketches from previous seasons, including a Mother's Day Lawrence Welk Show sketch from season 35 with host Betty White.
