= Chloe Fineman =

American actress and comedian (born 1988)

- Born: Chloe Rose Fineman; July 20, 1988 (age 38); Berkeley, California, U.S.
- Education: New York University (BFA)
- Occupations: Actress; comedian; impressionist
- Years active: 2011–present
- Known for: Saturday Night Live

Chloe Rose Fineman (born July 20, 1988) is an American actress and comedian. She became a featured player on the NBC sketch comedy series Saturday Night Live (SNL) in its 45th season in September 2019, and was promoted to repertory status in 2021 at the beginning of season 47. After seven seasons on the cast, she departed in July 2026.

== Early and personal life ==
Chloe Fineman's parents are painter Ellen Gunn and biotechnology executive David Fineman. She has two sisters, visual artist Emma and CrossFit athlete Alexia (Leka). Her father is Jewish and her mother is Protestant. Fineman attended Camp Kee Tov, a Jewish day camp at Congregation Beth El in Berkeley, California.

Fineman graduated from Piedmont High School in 2006. The school's acting teacher described her as "equally brilliant with comedy and drama". As a junior, Fineman directed Metamorphoses by Mary Zimmerman; as a senior, she directed The Vagina Monologues by Eve Ensler. She performed lead roles in The Visit by Friedrich Dürrenmatt and Crimes of the Heart by Beth Henley. Since her graduation, she has returned to Piedmont to direct plays and lead workshops. While in high school, Fineman impersonated a peafowl on the Late Show with David Letterman after placing second in a bird-calling competition. Fineman worked as a camp counselor at 16 but later got fired after pantsing a six-year-old boy, which exposed his penis. Her recollection of the story in a 2026 interview for Vanity Fair received widespread backlash online.

Fineman graduated in 2011 with a Bachelor of Fine Arts in acting from the Stella Adler Studio of Acting at the New York University Tisch School of the Arts. According to The Independent, as of 2026, Fineman is a member of the Church of Scientology.

== Career ==
=== 2017–2018: Early work ===
After graduating from college, Fineman moved to Los Angeles, where she performed in The Groundlings troupe's Sunday Company. She also performed in "Characters Welcome" at the Upright Citizens Brigade Theatre. In 2018, she was recognized as a "New Face" at the Just for Laughs festival in Montreal, and she was nominated for Best Comedian at the 2019 Shorty Awards. Her television appearances include Jane the Virgin and Search Party.

Fineman maintains an online presence known in particular for her celebrity impressions in front-facing camera comedy videos. On Instagram, she has posted celebrity impressions as well as clips from her Groundlings work and stand-up comedy. On YouTube, she has done character impressions. In 2018, Vulture critic Luke Kelly-Clyne wrote that after seeing Fineman do impressions of Meryl Streep and others, "As I found out, that extra bit of genius she possesses—that intangible thing that takes a good impression to a great impression—is rooted in her ability to create entirely original characters who feel as real as anyone you've ever met," concluding, "Chloe Fineman is absolutely one of the most talented new performers right now, and she's long overdue for a break." Fineman is well known for her celebrity impressions, and the celebrities she has done impersonations of include: Drew Barrymore, Meryl Streep, Nicole Kidman, Reese Witherspoon, Britney Spears, Timothée Chalamet, Julianne Moore, Miley Cyrus, JoJo Siwa, Shia LaBeouf, Kim Cattrall and Jennifer Coolidge.

=== 2019–2026: Saturday Night Live ===
On September 12, 2019, Saturday Night Live announced that Fineman would be added as a featured player for the 45th season, along with Bowen Yang and Shane Gillis. Alongside Yang and Heidi Gardner, Fineman was cited as the season's best performer by Andy Hoglund at Entertainment Weekly. Her promotion to repertory status was announced on September 27, 2021, shortly before the show's 47th season began.

Fineman portrayed Sylvia Plath in the Apple TV+ series Dickinson (2021). In 2022, she had a supporting comedic role as Natalie Vance, a wedding planner, in the romantic comedy Father of the Bride. She also portrayed Marion Davies in Damien Chazelle's 2022 film Babylon. In 2024, she appeared in Francis Ford Coppola's science-fiction epic Megalopolis in the role of Clodia Pulcher, with Coppola casting Fineman after seeing her in a 2019 stage show where she imitated Melania Trump video calling Ivana Trump. She starred in the sex comedy Summer of 69, released on Hulu in 2025.

Fineman has been the spokesperson for Anheuser-Busch's Nütrl Vodka Seltzer since 2023. She appears in its TV advertisements as eccentric vodka-seltzer sommelier Günter.

On July 16, 2026, Fineman announced that she was leaving SNL after 7 seasons.

== Filmography ==
=== Film ===
Key
†	Denotes films that have not yet been released

Year	Title	Role	Notes
2022	Home Team	Intern Emily	
2022	Father of the Bride	Natalie Vance	
2022	White Noise	Simuvac Technician	
2022	Babylon	Marion Davies	
2023	Baby Shark's Big Movie!	Lannie	Voice
2024	Megalopolis	Clodia Pulcher	
2024	Despicable Me 4	Patsy Prescott	Voice
2025	Summer of 69	Santa Monica	
2025	Freakier Friday	GiGi	
2026	Love Language	Marion	
2026	The Dink	Marisa	
TBA	Red, White & Royal Wedding †	TBA	Post-production

=== Television ===
Year	Title	Role	Notes
2018	Mozart in the Jungle	Fanny Mendelssohn	Episode: "An Honest Ghost"
2018	Grown-ish	Waiter 1	Episode: "It's Hard Out Here for a Pimp"
2018	Jane the Virgin	Assistant	Episode: "Chapter Seventy-Seven"
2019–2026	Saturday Night Live	Herself/Various	Main role (132 episodes)
2020	High Fidelity	Clara	Episode: "Good Luck and Goodbye"
2020–2021	Search Party	Charlie Reeny	6 episodes
2021	Cinema Toast	Holly	Voice; episode: "One Gay Wedding and a Thousand Funerals"
2021	Awkwafina Is Nora from Queens	Greta	Episode: "Stop! Nora Time"
2021	Dickinson	Sylvia Plath	Episode: "The Future Never Spoke"
2021–2025	Big Mouth	Leah Birch / Various	Voice; 16 episodes
2023	Is It Cake?	Herself / Judge	Episode: "Cake University"
2023	Twisted Metal	Bloody Mary	Episode: "NUTH0UZ"
2024	Baby Shark's Big Show!	Lannie	Voice; episodes: "The Danceathon," "One Little Peak" and "Lannie's Lights"
2024	The Simpsons	Tasha	Voice; episode: "The Yellow Lotus"
2024	Laid	Chelsea	2 episodes
2025	SNL50: The Homecoming Concert	Herself	Television special
2025	Saturday Night Live 50th Anniversary Special	Various	Television special
TBA	Myron Bolitar	Parker Quinn	Main role, upcoming series

=== Theater ===
Year	Title	Role	Playwright(s)	Venue	Ref.
2024	Gutenberg! The Musical!	Producer	Scott Brown and Anthony King	James Earl Jones Theatre, Broadway	
2024–2025	All In: Comedy About Love	Performer	Simon Rich	Hudson Theatre, Broadway	
