= Aidy Bryant =

American actress and comedian (born 1987)

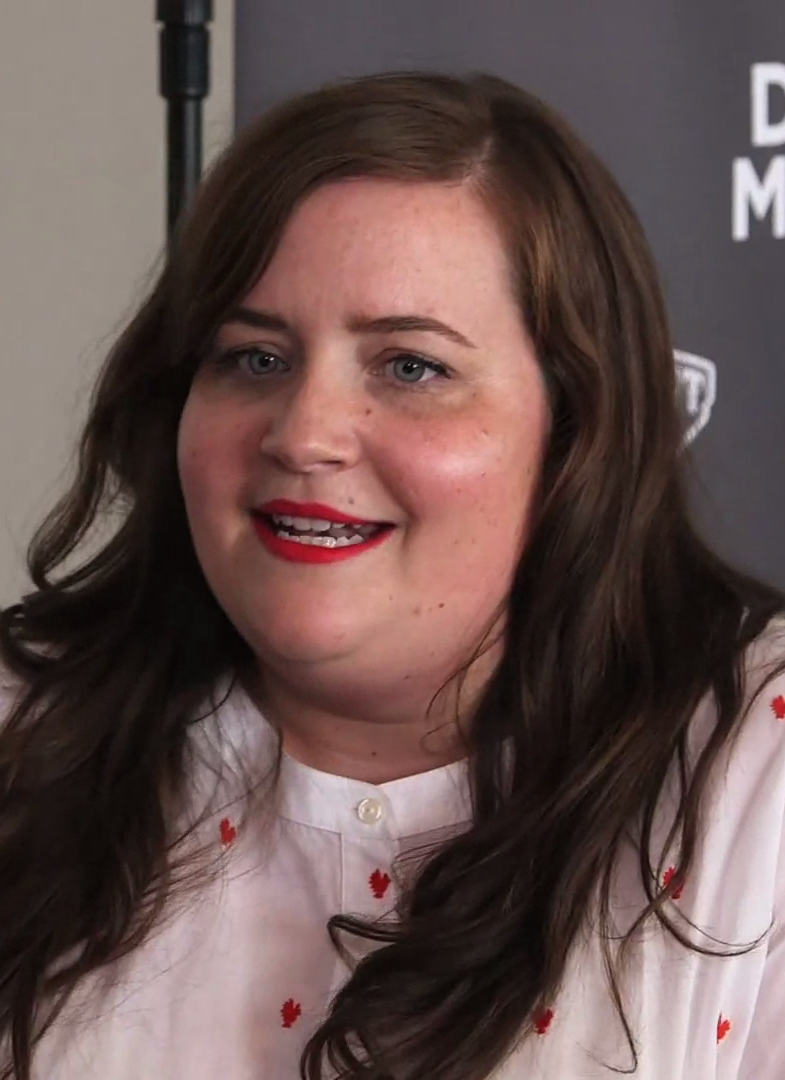
- Bryant in 2015
- Born: May 7, 1987 (age 39); Phoenix, Arizona, U.S.
- Education: Columbia College Chicago (BA)
- Occupations: Actress; comedian
- Years active: 2011–present
- Spouse: Conner O'Malley (m. 2018)

Aidy Bryant (born May 7, 1987) is an American actress and comedian. Bryant was a cast member on the NBC late-night sketch comedy series Saturday Night Live for ten seasons, joining the show for its 38th season in 2012, and leaving at the end of its 47th season in 2022. For her work on the series, she was nominated for three Primetime Emmy Awards, including two nominations for Outstanding Supporting Actress in a Comedy Series.

Her other work includes a voice role in the animated series Danger & Eggs (2017) and the Netflix adult animated series Human Resources. She played a starring role in the sitcom Shrill (2019–2021). She also served as writer and executive producer and was nominated for the Primetime Emmy Award for Outstanding Lead Actress in a Comedy Series.

== Early life ==
Bryant was born on May 7, 1987, in Phoenix, Arizona, to Georganne (née Vinall) and Tom Bryant. Her mother owns a boutique, Frances, in Phoenix. She has one brother. She graduated from Xavier College Preparatory in 2005. Her parents took her to improv workshops at the now-defunct Arizona Jewish Theatre Company.

She graduated from Columbia College in Chicago with a BA in 2009. At Columbia College, she participated in the college's comedy studies program, developed by the Theatre Department and The Second City.

== Career ==
Bryant and Mike Birbiglia

After Bryant graduated from Columbia College, she toured with the musical improv group Baby Wants Candy and was approached by The Second City. She has performed with iO Chicago, The Second City and the Annoyance Theatre. She was a writer and ensemble member for both "Sky's the Limit, Weather Permitting" and "We're All In This Room Together" on the Second City Stage.

Bryant made her debut as a featured player on Saturday Night Live on September 15, 2012. She was promoted to a repertory player during her second season on the show.

In 2013, Bryant landed a recurring role in the second season of IFC's Comedy Bang! Bang!, playing the show's segment producer. Bryant also made an uncredited cameo appearance in The Amazing Spider-Man 2. She has made guest appearances on programs such as Broad City, Documentary Now!, The Awesomes, and Girls.

In 2014, Bryant, Eli Bruggemann, Chris Kelly, Sarah Schneider, and Kate McKinnon were nominated for a Primetime Emmy Award in the category of Outstanding Original Music and Lyrics for the "Home for the Holiday (Twin Bed)". The music video sketch aired on December 21, 2013. She won the award for Supporting Actress in a Comedy Series at the 2015 EWwy awards which honor performances that were snubbed by the Emmys.

In 2016, Bryant had a recurring role as Alice in the Louis C.K. series, Horace and Pete. In 2017, Bryant provided the voice of main character D.D. Danger on the animated series Danger & Eggs. In 2018, Bryant received a nomination at the 70th Primetime Emmy Awards for Outstanding Supporting Actress in a Comedy Series.

In 2019, Bryant starred in the Hulu series Shrill. After Bryant became involved with Shrill, as a co-writer, co-executive producer and as the main character, there was a question of whether she would return for the 2019–20 season of Saturday Night Live, although Lorne Michaels encouraged her to work on both shows. Bryant stated that she would work 12-hour days on Shrill and then at SNL afterwards, accounting for 22-hour days. Shrill would run for three seasons ending in May 2021, and Bryant was told that its third season would be the last one after it was shot. Bryant planned to exit SNL after its 45th season, however, the COVID-19 pandemic caused her to reconsider leaving after 'one last normal year' that concluded with the 2021-2022 47th season.

In 2021, Bryant had signed an overall deal with Universal Television. She voiced Emmy on the adult animated series Human Resources, a spin-off of Big Mouth, which premiered on March 18, 2022.

In October 2022, Bryant directed a music video for the song "Hurricane" by country music duo Plains (Katie Crutchfield and Jess Williamson).

In February 2024, Bryant hosted the 2024 edition of the Independent Spirit Awards, an awards show dedicated to independent films. Her performance as host was praised, with British Vogue writer Emma Specter noting that she was "able to roll with the live-performance element of the gig without radiating the nervous and clammy energy of a less-experienced performer". In October 2024, it was announced that she would return to host the awards in 2025.

Bryant is set to star in the upcoming Peacock dramedy Lonely Hearts Club.

=== Recurring characters on SNL ===
- One of the students in the "Shallon" (Nasim Pedrad) sketches
- Morgan, co-host of Girlfriends Talk Show, who always gets shunned or ignored by her friend Kyra (Cecily Strong) in favor of a cooler guest
- Tonker Bell, Tinker Bell's rude-mannered half-sister, whose dad is a housefly
- One of the actors in a dramatic High School Theater production, who awkwardly attempt to make broad points about society's issues
- Li'l Baby Aidy, a characterization of herself in the show's all-female music videos (so called because she was the youngest [the "baby"] of the current female cast)
- Melanie, a flirtatious young teen with a romantic spark for mature gentlemen – said gentlemen being her friends' fathers
- An unnamed girl who appears in porno movie scenarios and is oblivious to their sexual nature – in Hot for Teacher 8, she tried to ask her teacher, Miss Dayworth (Amy Schumer), for help on the unspecified assignment; in The Doctor Is In... My Butt 4, she thinks Dr. Rockhard (Adam Driver) is a real doctor; and in Skank Babysitter 17, she thinks her babysitter Miss Jasmine (Heidi Gardner) invited a pizza delivery man (Chance the Rapper) over for dinner.
- Sarah Huckabee Sanders, former White House Press Secretary
- Carrie Krum, 7th grade travel expert
- Ted Cruz, U.S. Senator

== Personal life ==
Bryant met comedian and writer Conner O'Malley in 2008 when they performed together at the Annoyance Theatre in Chicago. The couple became engaged in 2016, and married on April 28, 2018.

== Filmography ==
=== Film ===
Year	Title	Role	Notes
2014	The Amazing Spider-Man 2	Statue of Liberty Lady	
2014	Kids	Sarah	Short film
2015	Prom Queen	Teacher #1	Short film
2016	Brother Nature	Dana Curlman	
2016	Darby Forever	Darby	Short film; also writer and producer
2017	The Big Sick	Mary	
2017	The Star	Ruth (voice)	
2018	I Feel Pretty	Vivian	

=== Television ===
Year	Title	Role	Notes
2012–2014	Shrink	Kendra Harnz	3 episodes; also writer of 2 episodes
2012–2022, 2025	Saturday Night Live	Herself / Various characters	207 episodes
2012	Saturday Night Live Weekend Update Thursday	Judge / Patron / Woman	2 episodes
2013	Comedy Bang! Bang!	Segment Producer	2 episodes
2014	The Greatest Event in Television History	Amy	Episode: "Bosom Buddies"
2015	Broad City	Allie	Episode: "St. Marks"
2015	Documentary Now!	Anne Severino	Episode: "A Town, a Gangster, a Festival"
2015	The Awesomes	Unknown character (voice)	2 episodes
2015–2017	Girls	Abigail	4 episodes
2016	Horace and Pete	Alice Wittel	4 episodes
2017	Danger & Eggs	D.D. Danger (voice)	13 episodes
2017	At Home with Amy Sedaris	Mulaak	Episode: "Out of This World"
2018	Portlandia	Patient	Episode: "Shared Workspace"
2018	Unbreakable Kimmy Schmidt	Tabby Bobatti	Episode: "Party Monster: Scratching the Surface"
2019	The Other Two	Herself	Episode: "Chase Shoots a Music Video"
2019–2021	Shrill	Annie Easton	22 episodes; also creator, writer and executive producer
2021	Teenage Euthanasia	(voice)	Episode: "Suddenly Susan"
2021	Santa Inc.	Petunia/Co-Worker (voice)	Episode: "Spring Awakening"
2021–2025	Big Mouth	Emmy Fairfax (voice)	3 episodes
2022–2023	Human Resources	Emmy Fairfax (voice)	Main cast
2022	The Kardashians	Herself	Episode: "Live from New York"
2024	39th Independent Spirit Awards	Herself (host)	Television special
2024	Fantasmas	Denise	Episode: "Toilets"
2025	40th Independent Spirit Awards	Herself (host)	Television special
2025	Platonic	Carrie	5 episodes
2026	Mating Season	Nancy (voice)	2 episodes
TBA	Lonely Hearts Club	TBA	Filming

=== Webseries ===
Year	Title	Role	Notes
2011	Enterprenerds	Kathy Kielty	Episode: "Short Squeeze"

== Awards and nominations ==
Year	Association	Category	Work	Result	Ref.
2014	Primetime Emmy Awards	Outstanding Original Music and Lyrics	Saturday Night Live	Nominated	
2018	Primetime Emmy Awards	Outstanding Supporting Actress in a Comedy Series	Saturday Night Live	Nominated	
2021	Primetime Emmy Awards	Outstanding Supporting Actress in a Comedy Series	Saturday Night Live	Nominated	
2021	Primetime Emmy Awards	Outstanding Lead Actress in a Comedy Series	Shrill	Nominated	
