= Cecily Strong =

American actress (born 1984)

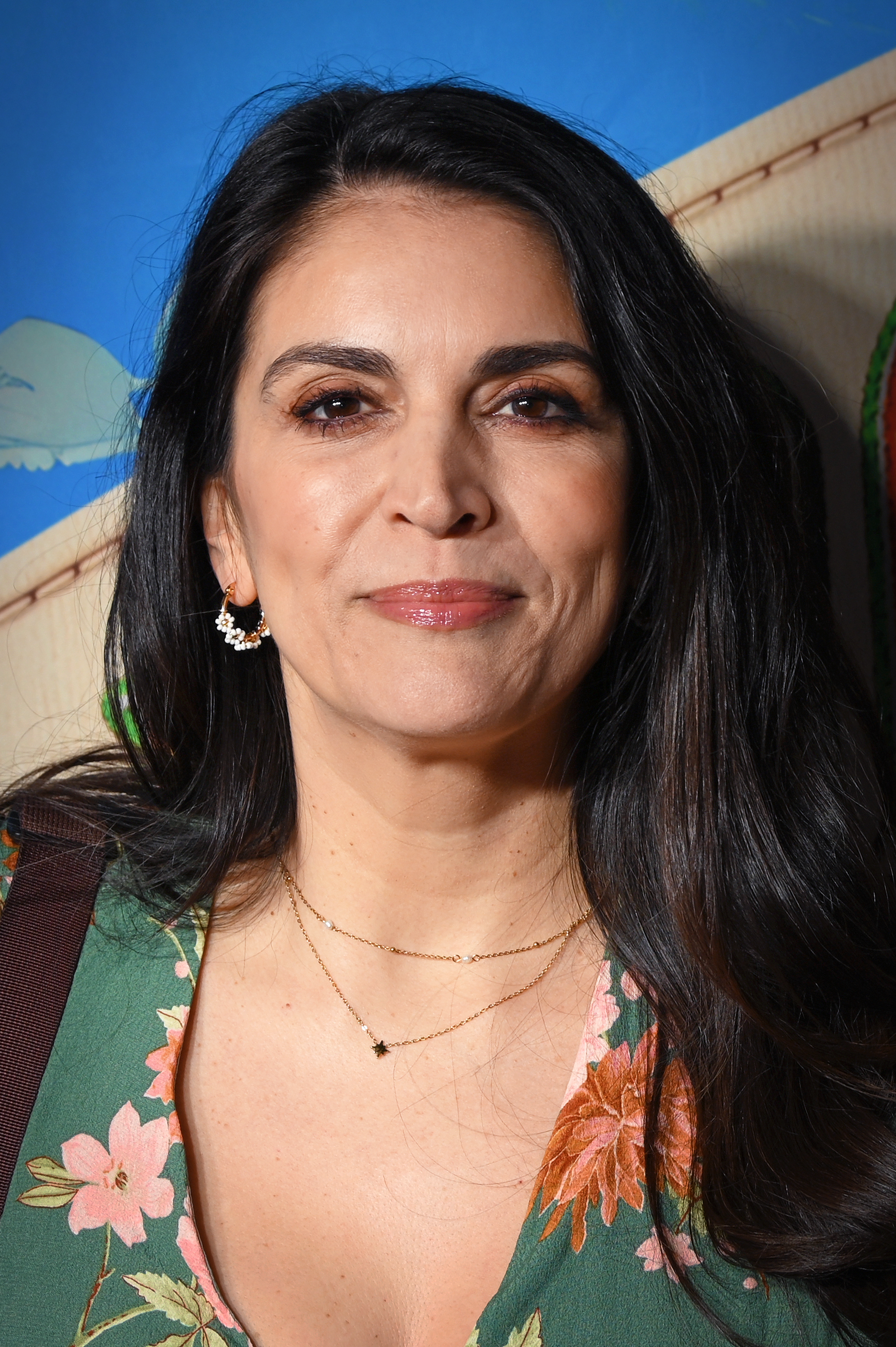
- Strong in 2026
- Born: Cecily Legler Strong; February 8, 1984 (age 42); Springfield, Illinois, U.S.
- Education: California Institute of the Arts (BFA)
- Occupations: Actress; comedian
- Years active: 2012–present
- Known for: Saturday Night Live (2012–2022); Schmigadoon! (2021–2023)
- Children: 1

Cecily Legler Strong (born February 8, 1984) is an American actress and comedian. She was a cast member on the NBC sketch comedy series Saturday Night Live from 2012 to 2022. She is the longest-tenured female cast member in the show's history.

Strong has a starring role on the Apple TV+ musical comedy series Schmigadoon! (2021–2023), which she also co-produced. Her other roles include voice work on The Awesomes (2013–2015), supporting roles in films such as Ghostbusters, The Meddler, and The Female Brain. She hosted the White House Correspondents' Dinner in 2015. Her first book, the memoir This Will All Be Over Soon, was published in 2021.

For her work on Saturday Night Live, Strong was nominated for Outstanding Supporting Actress in a Comedy Series at the 72nd and 73rd Primetime Emmy Awards.

== Early life ==
Strong was born in Springfield, Illinois, and was raised in Oak Park, an inner ring suburb of Chicago. She is the daughter of Penelope and William "Bill" Strong, who worked as an Associated Press bureau chief and as of 2013 ran his own public-relations firm. Penny Legler Strong is a nurse practitioner, having worked extensively at area hospitals. Strong's parents are divorced. Strong grew up adoring SNL as a child, reenacting sketches with her friend and watching old SNL commercials on VHS. "I had a tape of the best commercials, and I wore it out, every day." She has stated that she was inspired by Phil Hartman.

In a 2021 interview with Terry Gross on the National Public Radio program Fresh Air, Strong said that because her uncle is a Broadway producer, as a child she often was able to attend Broadway shows and sometimes go back stage to meet their casts.

She attended Oak Park and River Forest High School until her sophomore year, when she was expelled for bringing marijuana to school. She then attended a private Catholic school until transferring for her senior year to the Chicago Academy for the Arts, where she graduated in 2002. She then studied acting at California Institute of the Arts (CalArts), graduating in 2006 with a BFA in theatre. After graduating, Strong returned to Chicago where she studied at the Second City Conservatory and iO Chicago.

== Career ==
Strong performed regularly with The Second City touring group and worked the box office at iO Chicago. Strong performed on a cruise ship with other Second City members for four months. She appeared at the Chicago Sketch Fest, Chicago Just for Laughs, the New York Sketchfest, the Edinburgh Fringe Festival, the Goodman Theater, the Bailiwick Theater, the Mercury Theater, and with the all-female improv troupe Virgin Daiquiri.

=== Saturday Night Live ===
Strong debuted as a featured player on Saturday Night Live on September 15, 2012. The next season, Strong became a repertory player and co-anchored the recurring Weekend Update segment with Seth Meyers, beginning with the season 39 premiere. Strong later co-anchored with Colin Jost, and was replaced on Weekend Update with writer Michael Che, beginning with the season 40 premiere in September 2014, partly at her own request to focus on doing sketches as a part of the regular cast. In 2020, Strong was nominated for her first Primetime Emmy Award for Outstanding Supporting Actress in a Comedy Series for her work on the show. She was nominated again in 2021. She was also nominated for Best Supporting Actress in a Comedy Series at the 12th Critics' Choice Television Awards.

Strong drew praise from abortion-rights supporters, and strong backlash from abortion opponents, after appearing in a comedy skit, "Goober the Clown Who Had An Abortion When She Was 23", during a Weekend Update sketch on the November 6, 2021, episode. The sketch followed U.S. Supreme Court oral arguments in two cases relating to the Texas Heartbeat Act. Strong later confirmed on her Instagram account that the sketch referenced her own abortion. Strong followed up on the commentary a year later, during a Weekend Update sketch on the November 5, 2022, episode, appearing as "Tammy the Trucker on Gas Prices and Definitely Not Abortion" before the 2022 midterm elections.

Strong returned to SNL for season 48, and passed former castmate Kate McKinnon as the longest-running female cast member in the show's history, though she missed the first three shows of the season reprising her role in the play The Search for Signs of Intelligent Life in the Universe in Los Angeles. She returned on the October 29, 2022, episode. Strong passed McKinnon's record with the December 17, 2022, episode, her last.

==== Recurring characters ====
- The Girl You Wish You Hadn't Started a Conversation with at a Party, an unintelligent, unnamed pseudo-activist,
- Dana, a loud-mouthed, unfriendly retail employee who along with Niff (played by Bobby Moynihan) always insults her coworkers out of fear of being fired,
- Donna Fingerneck, The Art of the Encounter and Women in the Workplace co-host with Jodi Cork (played by Kate McKinnon),
- Heather, a one-dimensional female character from a male-driven comedy,
- Kyra, co-host of The Girlfriends Talk Show, alongside Morgan (played by Aidy Bryant),
- Cathy Anne, the drug-addicted neighbor of Michael Che (usually introduced by Che as "the woman who's always yelling outside my window"), who has strong opinions on current events,
- An unnamed blonde former porn star-turned-model/commercial actress who hawks elegant items alongside Brecky (played by Vanessa Bayer),
- Gemma, an aspiring British singer with various boyfriends,
- Gracelynn Chisholm, co-host of morning show Right Side of the Bed with her husband Cory (played by Taran Killam),
- Joelle LaRue, one of the two French animal-based video clip show presenters, alongside Noelle LeSoup (played by Kate McKinnon),
- Lonnie, one of the two unintelligent kids (the other being Josh, played by Mikey Day) in the Science Room sketches.

=== Other work ===
Strong was the featured entertainer at the 2015 White House Correspondents' Association dinner. She took digs at the various news organizations in attendance, politicians of all persuasions, and President Obama. She also took shots at the U.S. Secret Service, host location the Washington Hilton, Brian Williams, Sarah Koenig and the state of Indiana.

In 2016, she appeared in a commercial for Old Navy, alongside other SNL cast members Nasim Pedrad and Jay Pharoah. That year, Strong also joined the climate change documentary show Years of Living Dangerously as a celebrity correspondent. In 2016, she guest starred as Samantha Stevens in TBS's Angie Tribeca and Catherine Hobart in Fox's Scream Queens. She has appeared in a series of commercials for Triscuit since 2017. Starting in 2020 she starred in a series of Prego Spaghetti sauce commercials and in 2022 she was in several Verizon commercials featuring Apple+ TV with several co-stars including Adam Scott and Julian Edelman.

Her first book, a memoir titled This Will All Be Over Soon, was published on August 10, 2021. The book addresses "the challenges of beginning a relationship during the pandemic; the pain of losing family and friends; the pivotal events of her life that shaped her; and the importance of gratitude for each passing day." It developed from an essay she wrote about grieving the loss of her cousin Owen to brain cancer in the middle of the COVID-19 pandemic that was first published on Vulture.com in 2020.

In 2021, Strong appeared in HBO Max's six-part comedy series That Damn Michael Che, featuring SNL castmate Michael Che. The same year, she starred in, and was a producer for, Schmigadoon!, a musical parody series on Apple TV+. Developed by Cinco Paul and Ken Daurio, and produced by SNL's Lorne Michaels, the series centers on a couple (played by Strong and Keegan-Michael Key) stuck in a 1940s studio musical town until they find "true love".

Strong made her New York stage debut in an Off Broadway revival of Jane Wagner's one-woman play The Search for Signs of Intelligent Life in the Universe, which starred Lily Tomlin in 1985. Directed by Leigh Silverman, the show opened at The Shed on January 11, 2022.

Strong co-starred in the off Broadway play Brooklyn Laundry, which opened at the New York Center on February 28, 2024. She had a small part in the 2025 film Zootopia 2 as Judith, a young arctic shrew.

Strong co-starred in an off-Broadway revival of What Happened Was..., which opened at the Minetta Lane Theatre on April 14, 2026.

== Personal life ==
In March 2024, Strong revealed that she was engaged to her partner John MacGregor.

Strong gave birth to her first child, a girl, conceived through in vitro fertilization in April 2025.

== Filmography ==
=== Film ===
Year	Title	Role	Other notes
2012	How to Sponsor a Uterus	Karen Rigsby	Short film
2015	The Bronze	Janice Townsend	
2015	Slow Learners	Amber the ex	
2015	The Meddler	Jillian	
2015	Staten Island Summer	Mary Ellen	
2016	The Boss	Dana Dandridge	
2016	Ghostbusters	Jennifer Lynch	
2018	The Female Brain	Zoe	
2022	Sparring Partner	Woman	Short film
2023	Leo	Virginia Malkin (voice)	
2024	The Garfield Movie	Marge "Margie" Malone (voice)	
2025	Zootopia 2	Little Judith (voice)	Cameo

=== Television ===
Year	Title	Role	Other notes
2012–2022	Saturday Night Live	Herself, Various	213 episodes
2012	Saturday Night Live Weekend Update Thursday	Various	2 episodes
2013–2015	The Awesomes	Various Voices	13 episodes
2015	White House Correspondents' Dinner	Herself (host)	Featured entertainer
2016	Angie Tribeca	Samantha Stevens	Episode: "Tribeca's Day Off"
2016	Years of Living Dangerously	Herself	Episode: "A Race Against Time"
2016	Netflix Presents: The Characters	Herself	Episode: "Natasha Rothwell"
2016	Superstore	Missy Jones	Episode: "Olympics"
2016	Maya & Marty	Princess Peach, Carol McNally, Herself	Episode: "Ricky Gervais and Cecily Strong"
2016	Scream Queens	Catherine Hobart	Episode: "Scream Again"
2017	Man Seeking Woman	CCN Reporter	Episode: "Horse"
2017	Detroiters	Roz Chunks	Episode: "Dream Cruise"
2017	Great News	Jessica	Episode: "Night of the Living Screen"
2018	The Simpsons	Megan Matheson (voice)	Episode: "Homer Is Where the Art Isn't"
2018	Nature Cat	Petunia (voice)	Episode: "Garden Impossible"
2019	RuPaul's Drag Race All Stars	Herself (guest judge)	Episode: "Roast in Peace"
2019	I Think You Should Leave with Tim Robinson	Brenda	Episode: "It's the Cigars You Smoke That Is Going to Give You Cancer"
2020	Loafy	Becca	Main cast
2021	That Damn Michael Che	Woman in elevator	Episode: "Policin'"
2021–2023	Schmigadoon!	Melissa Gimble	Main cast; also producer
2024–2025	Last Week Tonight with John Oliver	Various	2 episodes

== Stage ==
Theatre credits
Year	Title	Role	Venue	Refs.
1996	Pope Joan	Young Joan, Joan's daughter	Mercury Theater, Chicago	
1996	The House of Martin Guerre	Bertrande	Goodman Theatre, Chicago	
2006	September 11, 2001	performer	Théâtre national de la Colline, Paris	
2022	The Search for Signs of Intelligent Life in the Universe	performer	The Shed, Off-Broadway; Mark Taper Forum, Los Angeles	
2024	Brooklyn Laundry	Fran	New York City Center Stage I, Off-Broadway	
2026	What Happened Was...	Jackie	Minetta Lane Theatre, Off-Broadway	

== Awards and nominations ==
Year	Award	Category	Title	Result	Notes
2022	Drama League Awards	Distinguished Performance Award	The Search for Signs of Intelligent Life in the Universe	Nominated	
2021	Critics' Choice Television Awards	Best Supporting Actress in a Comedy Series	Saturday Night Live	Nominated	
2021	Primetime Emmy Awards	Outstanding Supporting Actress in a Comedy Series	Saturday Night Live	Nominated	
2020	Primetime Emmy Awards	Outstanding Supporting Actress in a Comedy Series	Saturday Night Live	Nominated	
2020	Online Film & Television; Association Awards	Best Female Performance in a Variety Program	Saturday Night Live	Nominated	
2019	Online Film & Television; Association Awards	Best Female Performance in a Variety Program	Saturday Night Live	Nominated	
2014	Online Film & Television; Association Awards	Best Female Performance in a Fiction Program	Saturday Night Live	Nominated	

Media offices
Preceded by Seth Meyers as sole anchor	Weekend Update anchor with Seth Meyers; September 28, 2013 – February 1, 2014	Succeeded by Cecily Strong and Colin Jost
Preceded by Seth Meyers and Cecily Strong	Weekend Update anchor with Colin Jost; March 1 – May 17, 2014	Succeeded by Colin Jost and Michael Che
