= Saturday Night Live season 43 =

Saturday Night Live
- Season 43
- No. of episodes: 21

Release
- Original network: NBC
- Original release: September 30, 2017 – May 19, 2018

Season chronology
- ← Previous season 42 Next → season 44

The forty-third season of the NBC sketch comedy series Saturday Night Live premiered on September 30, 2017, during the 2017–2018 television season with host Ryan Gosling and musical guest Jay-Z, and concluded on May 19, 2018, with host Tina Fey and musical guest Nicki Minaj. Like the final four episodes of season 42, season 43 was the first full season to broadcast live in all four time zones within the contiguous United States, with the exception of the Natalie Portman/Dua Lipa episode due to the network's commitment to the NFL.

== Cast ==
Prior to the start of the season, longtime cast members Vanessa Bayer, Bobby Moynihan, and Sasheer Zamata all left the show after seven, nine, and four seasons, respectively. Following Bayer, Moynihan, and Zamata's departures, the show hired three new featured players: comedian and writer Heidi Gardner of The Groundlings, iO Chicago alum Luke Null, and stand-up comedian Chris Redd, who previously did sketch comedy at Second City. Redd had been incorrectly reported as joining the cast during the previous season. Mikey Day, Alex Moffat, and Melissa Villaseñor, all three of whom had been hired the prior year for season 42, continued as featured players for this season.

With this announcement came the confirmation that the rest of the cast from the previous season would return, including guest star Alec Baldwin in his role as President Donald Trump.

With his return, Kenan Thompson surpassed Darrell Hammond's record as the longest-tenured cast member in the show's history, with a total of fifteen seasons compared to Hammond's fourteen seasons from 1995–2009.

This is the only season for Luke Null, who was let go after the season's end.

=== Cast roster ===
**Repertory Players**

- Beck Bennett
- Aidy Bryant
- **Michael Che**
- Pete Davidson
- Leslie Jones
- **Colin Jost**
- Kate McKinnon
- Kyle Mooney
- Cecily Strong
- Kenan Thompson

**Featured Players**

- Mikey Day
- Heidi Gardner
- Alex Moffat
- Luke Null
- Chris Redd
- Melissa Villaseñor

bold denotes "Weekend Update" anchor

== Crew ==
=== Writers ===
Prior to the start of the season, the show added Steven Castillo, Andrew Dismukes, Claire Friedman, Sam Jay, Erik Marino, Nimesh Patel, and Gary Richardson to the writing staff.

Also prior to the season, head writers Chris Kelly and Sarah Schneider (who had written for the show overall since 2011, and were named as head writers at the start of the previous season) departed the show. Kent Sublette and Bryan Tucker remained as the sole head writers for the first-half of the season. At the start of the season, writer Streeter Seidell (who joined the writing staff in 2014) was named as the season's sole writing supervisor.

Weekend Update writer Katie Rich (who was previously suspended midway through last season for a controversial Tweet about Barron Trump) was brought back to the writing staff with the Weekend Update: Summer Edition episodes, and officially returned as a writer this season. Additionally, beginning with this season, Weekend Update writers were credited separately from the rest of the writing staff.

On December 12, 2017, Jost and Che were named co-head writers, making Che the first African American head writer. Jost was previously a head writer from 2012 to 2015. With the same episode, writers Fran Gillespie and Sudi Green (who had both joined the writing staff in 2015) were named co-writing supervisors alongside Seidell.

This was the final season for longtime segment director/writer Dave McCary (who had overall been with the show since 2013).

This was Tucker's final season as head writer (a role he held beginning in 2014), as he would be named a senior writer at the start of the following season. This was the only season for Friedman, Marino, and Patel.

== Episodes ==
No. overall	No. in season	Host	Musical guest	Original release date	Ratings/ Share
830	1	Ryan Gosling	Jay-Z	September 30, 2017	4.5
Jay-Z performs "Bam" with Damian Marley and "4:44".; Alec Baldwin appears as Donald Trump in the cold open.; Emma Stone appears in the opening monologue.; Kenan Thompson's return for his fifteenth season on the show makes him the longest tenured cast member in the show's history, surpassing the previous record of fourteen seasons, which he had held jointly with Darrell Hammond.; Heidi Gardner, Luke Null and Chris Redd's first episode as cast members.; A photograph of Hugh Hefner, who had died the previous week, is shown in silence before the goodnights.
831	2	Gal Gadot	Sam Smith	October 7, 2017	4.4
Sam Smith performs "Too Good at Goodbyes" and "Pray".; Jason Aldean performs "I Won't Back Down" in the cold open as a tribute to the victims of the 2017 Las Vegas shooting and to Tom Petty, who died earlier in the week.; As mentioned by Gadot during the monologue, this was the first episode to be broadcast live in Israel; until this night, it took a week for episodes aired in the US to appear on Israeli TV. During the monologue, Gadot speaks a few sentences in Hebrew for the Israeli audience. The Hebrew sentences are subtitled in English.; "Safelite AutoGlass" was subsequently pulled from rebroadcasts and the Internet after Safelite complained on Twitter that the sketch was offensive (and the humor in it would be considered in bad taste due to the influx of news at the time about male celebrities being outed as sexual offenders). Rebroadcasts of the show replaced the segment with a previously unaired, but released to the Internet, music video sketch called "The Last Fry". As of 2019, Hulu has the original Safelite sketch and "The Last Fry" is no longer shown.; When the episode was rerun on August 18, 2018, a photograph of Aretha Franklin, who had died two days earlier, was shown in silence before the goodnights.
832	3	Kumail Nanjiani	P!nk	October 14, 2017	4.6/11
P!nk performs "What About Us" and "Beautiful Trauma".; Alec Baldwin appears as Donald Trump in the cold open.
833	4	Larry David	Miley Cyrus	November 4, 2017	4.7/11
Miley Cyrus performs "Bad Mood" and "I Would Die for You" and also appears as a contestant in The Price Is Right sketch, Baby Snatch in "Baby Steps", and a member of the drama club in "Fresh Takes".; Alec Baldwin appears as Donald Trump in the cold open and as Tony Bennett in The Price Is Right.; Cyrus' then-fiancée Liam Hemsworth also appears in The Price Is Right.; Houston Astros baseball players and World Series champions Jose Altuve, Alex Bregman, and George Springer appear on Weekend Update.; Larry David's monologue generated controversy because he joked about dating in a Nazi concentration camp.
834	5	Tiffany Haddish	Taylor Swift	November 11, 2017	4.3/10
Taylor Swift performs "... Ready for It?" and an acoustic version of "Call It What You Want."; Larry David and Jason Sudeikis appear as Bernie Sanders and Joe Biden, respectively, in "DNC Commercial". David, while in character, references the controversy that his monologue from the previous week generated, saying that any guy who makes jokes about concentration camps (himself) "should rot in hell".; A photo of SNL sound man George Corrado is shown in silence before the goodnights.; Haddish won an Emmy in 2018 for Outstanding Guest Actress in a Comedy Series for hosting.
835	6	Chance the Rapper	Eminem	November 18, 2017	4.3/10
Contrary to the usual format in which the musical guest perform two songs at two different segments, Eminem performs a single medley of "Walk on Water", "Stan", (Note: Eminem has previously performed "Stan" with Dido on October 7, 2000, the season premiere of the show's 26th season.) and "Love the Way You Lie." Skylar Grey performs the entire medley with Eminem, but is not credited as a musical guest.; Writer Gary Richardson appears in "Family Feud" as Steve Harvey’s fictional brother Ricky.; Questlove and Common appear in the pre-recorded "Rap History".
836	7	Saoirse Ronan	U2	December 2, 2017	4.3/10
U2 performs "American Soul" and "Get Out of Your Own Way."; Alec Baldwin appears as Donald Trump in the cold open.; Greta Gerwig appears in the pre-recorded "Office Race".; John McEnroe appears in "Bachelor Auction".; "Aer Lingus" generated controversy for portraying Irish people in a stereotypical manner. Ronan defended the sketch, saying that it was written with her input.
837	8	James Franco	SZA	December 9, 2017	4.5/10
SZA performs "The Weekend" and "Love Galore."; Jonah Hill, Steve Martin, and Seth Rogen appear in the opening monologue.; Dave Franco appears in "Reunion".
838	9	Kevin Hart	Foo Fighters	December 16, 2017	4.6/11
Foo Fighters perform "The Sky is a Neighborhood" and a medley of "Everlong", "Christmas (Baby Please Come Home)", and "Linus and Lucy".; Alec Baldwin and Scarlett Johansson appear as Donald and Ivanka Trump, respectively, in the cold open. Baldwin also introduces Foo Fighters' second performance.; The credits end with the cast ice skating on the skating rink near the Rockefeller Center Christmas Tree while Alec Baldwin and the Foo Fighters remain in the studio.
839	10	Sam Rockwell	Halsey	January 13, 2018	4.6/10
Halsey performs "Bad at Love" and "Him & I" with G-Eazy.; Fred Armisen and Bill Murray appear as Michael Wolff and Steve Bannon, respectively, in the cold open.; Stanley Tucci appears in the pre-recorded "Tucci Gang".; Rockwell accidentally said "fucking" during "Science Room with Mr. Science" (when he tells the kid assistants played by Mikey Day and Cecily Strong "You can't be this fucking stupid"). During Weekend Update, both Colin Jost and Michael Che said "shithole" while discussing a comment President Trump made using that word and how NBC wanted them to tone it down, but openly defied it. All instances were censored for the West Coast feed, which is delayed by a few seconds. While the program airs during the safe harbor period in the Eastern and Central time zones, SNL has aired live coast to coast since the spring of 2017, meaning that in the Mountain and Pacific time zones, Rockwell's comment would have been heard between 9:30 and 10:00 PM or 8:30 and 9:00 PM, respectively, potentially subjecting network affiliates in those regions to FCC fines for indecency if it had not been censored.
840	11	Jessica Chastain	Troye Sivan	January 20, 2018	4.3/10
Troye Sivan performs "My My My!" and "The Good Side."; Method Man appears in the pre-recorded The Fresh Prince of Bel-Air.
841	12	Will Ferrell	Chris Stapleton	January 27, 2018	4.9/11
Chris Stapleton performs "Midnight Train to Memphis" and "Hard Livin'", both with Sturgill Simpson.; Tracy Morgan appears in the pre-recorded "The House".
842	13	Natalie Portman	Dua Lipa	February 3, 2018	4.6/12
Dua Lipa performs "New Rules" and "Homesick."; Alec Baldwin appears as Donald Trump in the cold open.; Tina Fey and Rachel Dratch appear in "New England Patriots vs. The Philadelphia Eagles".; Andy Samberg appears in the pre-recorded "Natalie Raps II".; This is the only episode this season not to air live coast to coast due to NBC's commitment to the NFL and its NFL Honors special.
843	14	Charles Barkley	Migos	March 3, 2018	4.2/10
Migos performs "Stir Fry" and "Narcos."; Alec Baldwin appears as Donald Trump in the cold open.; Alex Rodriguez appears in "Champions".; Hilary Knight appears on Weekend Update.
844	15	Sterling K. Brown	James Bay	March 10, 2018	4.1/10
James Bay performs "Pink Lemonade" and "Wild Love."; Vanessa Bayer appears as Dawn Lazarus on Weekend Update.
845	16	Bill Hader	Arcade Fire	March 17, 2018	4.5/10
Arcade Fire performs "Creature Comfort" and "Put Your Money on Me" and appears in "CBC News Hour".; John Goodman and Fred Armisen appear as Rex Tillerson and Michael Wolff, respectively, in the cold open. Armisen also reprises his role as Stuart in The Californians.; John Mulaney appears as Stefon's lawyer Shy on Weekend Update.; Spike Jonze appears during Arcade Fire's second performance, operating a slot machine.; Jon Hamm appears during the goodnights.
846	17	Chadwick Boseman	Cardi B	April 7, 2018	4.6/11
Cardi B performs a medley of "Bodak Yellow" and "Bartier Cardi" for her first set and "Be Careful" for her second. She also appears in the pre-recorded "Aidy B".; During her performance of "Be Careful", Cardi B revealed her pregnancy for the first time by displaying her pregnant belly in a Christian Siriano dress.; This episode re-aired on September 5, 2020 in tribute to Chadwick Boseman following his August 28 death.; Alec Baldwin appears as Donald Trump in the cold open.
847	18	John Mulaney	Jack White	April 14, 2018	3.9/9
Jack White performs "Over and Over and Over" and "Connected by Love" with the McCrary Sisters and appears in the unaired "Wedding Toast" .; Ben Stiller and Robert De Niro appear as Michael Cohen and Robert Mueller, respectively, in the cold open.; Darrell Hammond mispronounces Mulaney's name as "John Mulvaney" during the introductions.; Nasim Pedrad appears as Ma Anand Sheela in the pre-recorded "Wild Wild Country".; Adam Driver appears in the pre-recorded "Fish Dreams", unaired during the episode though subsequently released online.
848	19	Donald Glover	Donald Glover (Note: For his musical performance, Glover was billed as his stage name Childish Gambino)	May 5, 2018	4.1/10
Glover performs "Saturday" and "This Is America."; The cold open features Ben Stiller as Michael Cohen, Alec Baldwin as Donald Trump, Martin Short as Harold Bornstein, Jimmy Fallon as Jared Kushner, Scarlett Johansson as Ivanka Trump, and Stormy Daniels as herself.; ASAP Rocky appears in the pre-recorded "FRIENDOS".; Zoë Kravitz introduces Glover's first performance.; Daniel Kaluuya introduces Glover's second performance.
849	20	Amy Schumer	Kacey Musgraves	May 12, 2018	4.3/10
Kacey Musgraves performs "High Horse" and "Slow Burn" and appears in the pre-recorded "Spirituality Rap", unaired during the episode though subsequently released online.; The mothers of Beck Bennett (Sarah), Aidy Bryant (Georgianne), Pete Davidson (Amy), Mikey Day (Sylvia), Colin Jost (Kerry), Kyle Mooney (Linda), Luke Null (Cindy), Chris Redd (Margaret), Kenan Thompson (Elizabeth), and Melissa Villaseñor (Lupe) appear in the cold open.; Melissa McCarthy appears as Michael Che's stepmother on Weekend Update.
850	21	Tina Fey	Nicki Minaj	May 19, 2018	4.5/11
Nicki Minaj performs "Chun-Li" and "Poke It Out" with Playboi Carti and appears in the pre-recorded and cut for time "Friendship Song".; Alec Baldwin, Robert De Niro, and Ben Stiller appear in the cold open as Donald Trump, Robert Mueller, and Michael Cohen, respectively. Additionally, De Niro appears in the opening monologue.; Fred Armisen, Benedict Cumberbatch, Donald Glover, Anne Hathaway, Tracy Morgan, Chris Rock, and Jerry Seinfeld appear in the opening monologue. Additionally, Armisen appears as Michael Wolff in "What I Did for Trump".; Lin-Manuel Miranda, Casey Nicholaw, Jeff Richmond (Fey's husband), and the Broadway cast of Mean Girls appear in the pre-recorded "Mean Girls".; John Goodman also appears as Rex Tillerson in "What I Did for Trump".; A photograph of Margot Kidder, who had died six days earlier, is shown in silence before the goodnights.; Luke Null's final episode as a cast member.

== Specials ==
Title	Original release date	Ratings/ Share
"The David S. Pumpkins Halloween Special"	October 28, 2017	3.4/8
21-minute animated special where David S. Pumpkins teaches a pair of siblings the true meaning of Halloween. Starring Tom Hanks as David S. Pumpkins, Mikey Day, Bobby Moynihan, and Streeter Seidell. Narrated by Peter Dinklage.
"SNL Presents: Halloween"	October 28, 2017	3.1/9
A collection of Halloween- and horror-themed sketches, including: "The Clinton's Halloween Party" from the season 33 episode hosted by Brian Williams; "Vincent Price's Halloween Special 1959" from the season 34 episode hosted by Jon Hamm; "Dave Chappelle's The Walking Dead" from the season 42 episode hosted by Dave Chappelle; "Most Haunted" from the season 32 episode hosted by Hugh Laurie; "Kellywise the Clown" from the season 43 episode hosted by Kumail Nanjiani; "Merryville Haunted Castle" from the season 38 episode hosted by Bruno Mars; "Firelight" from the season 35 episode hosted by Taylor Swift; "Stefon's Halloween Tourist Tips" from the season 38 episode hosted by Bruno Mars; "Haunted Elevator" from the season 42 episode hosted by Tom Hanks; "Wes Anderson's The Midnight Coterie of Sinister Intruders" from the season 39 episode hosted by Edward Norton; "Jeff Montgomery" from the season 34 episode hosted by Jon Hamm
