= Saturday Night Live season 44 =

Season of television series

Saturday Night Live
- Season 44
- No. of episodes: 21

Release
- Original network: NBC
- Original release: September 29, 2018 – May 18, 2019

Season chronology
- ← Previous season 43 Next → season 45

The forty-fourth season of the NBC comedy series Saturday Night Live premiered on September 29, 2018, during the 2018–19 television season with host Adam Driver and musical guest Kanye West and concluded on May 18, 2019, with host Paul Rudd and musical guest DJ Khaled.

== Cast ==
Prior to the start of the season, Luke Null (who joined the cast for the previous season) was let go from the show. Upright Citizens Brigade alum Ego Nwodim joined the cast as a featured player, replacing Null. Nwodim became the seventh African-American female cast member in the show's history. Mikey Day, Alex Moffat, and Melissa Villaseñor, all three of whom were hired in 2016 for season 42, were upgraded to repertory status, while Heidi Gardner and Chris Redd, both of whom were hired in 2017 for season 43, remained as featured players.

Aside from Null, all other cast members from the previous season returned to the show, including guest star Alec Baldwin in his role as President Donald Trump. Despite mounting rumors that this would be the last season for Kenan Thompson, Thompson insisted he would not be leaving SNL anytime soon.

This would be the final season for Leslie Jones, who had been with the cast for five seasons since 2014. Jones announced her departure on August 27, 2019, in favor of focusing on her movie career.

=== Cast roster ===
**Repertory players**

- Beck Bennett
- Aidy Bryant
- **Michael Che**
- Pete Davidson
- Mikey Day
- Leslie Jones
- **Colin Jost**
- Kate McKinnon
- Alex Moffat
- Kyle Mooney
- Cecily Strong
- Kenan Thompson
- Melissa Villaseñor

**Featured players**

- Heidi Gardner
- Ego Nwodim
- Chris Redd

bold denotes "Weekend Update" anchor

== Writers ==
Prior to the start of the season, the show added Alison Gates, Alan Linic, Eli Mandel, and Bowen Yang to the writing staff. Co-head writer Bryan Tucker was promoted to senior writer, while Colin Jost, Michael Che, and Kent Sublette remained as the show's head writers. In March 2019, writer Anna Drezen (who joined the writing staff in 2016) was promoted to co-writing supervisor, alongside Streeter Seidell, Fran Gillespie, and Sudi Green.

This was the final season for longtime Weekend Update writer Katie Rich, who had previously been a writer on the show since 2013.

== Episodes ==
No. overall	No. in season	Host	Musical guest(s)	Original release date	Ratings/ Share
851	1	Adam Driver	Kanye West	September 29, 2018	4.8/11
Kanye West performs "I Love It" with Lil Pump and Adele Givens (the latter via prerecorded video), "We Got Love" with Teyana Taylor, and "Ghost Town" with Kid Cudi, 070 Shake, Ty Dolla Sign (on guitar) and the Saturday Night Live Band (the latter replacing the extended goodnights). Additionally, Cudi appears in the pre-recorded Kyle Mooney film.; Following the goodnights, West, wearing a Make America Great Again hat, went off-script with his support for Donald Trump. This was discussed in the next episode, during the opening monologue and during the Weekend Update segment.; Matt Damon and Rachel Dratch appear as Brett Kavanaugh and Amy Klobuchar, respectively, in the cold open.; Wendy Williams appears in the pre-recorded Kyle Mooney film. Additionally, SNL writer and future cast member Bowen Yang also appears in the same film in a non-speaking role.; Ego Nwodim's first episode as a cast member.; Ariana Grande was originally chosen to be the musical guest, but she withdrew and was replaced by West.
852	2	Awkwafina	Travis Scott	October 6, 2018	4.2/10
Travis Scott performs a medley of "Skeletons" and "Astrothunder" with John Mayer and Kevin Parker on guitar and bass, respectively, and "Sicko Mode". Additionally, Scott appears in "Dance Battle".
853	3	Seth Meyers	Paul Simon	October 13, 2018	4.4/10
Paul Simon and yMusic perform "Can't Run But" and "Bridge over Troubled Water." (Note: Simon had previously performed "Bridge over Troubled Water" on November 20, 1976, the eighth episode of the show's second season.); Alec Baldwin appears as Donald Trump in the cold open.; The union representing officers in the Baltimore Police Department criticized the portrayal of its officers in "Thirsty Cops".; During the goodnights, the crew had a birthday cake rolled out for musical guest Paul Simon, who turned 77 that day.
854	4	Jonah Hill	Maggie Rogers	November 3, 2018	4.4/10
Maggie Rogers performs "Light On" and "Fallingwater" with Rostam Batmanglij on piano.; Drew Barrymore, Candice Bergen, and Tina Fey appear in the "Five-Timers Club" opening monologue.
855	5	Liev Schreiber	Lil Wayne	November 10, 2018	4.0/10
Lil Wayne performs "Can't Be Broken" with Halsey and "Uproar" with Swizz Beatz, and appears in the pre-recorded "Booty Kings".; Robert De Niro appears as Robert Mueller in the cold open.; Future also appears in "Booty Kings".; Dan Crenshaw appears on Weekend Update opposite Pete Davidson, referencing a controversial joke Davidson made about him the previous week.
856	6	Steve Carell	Ella Mai	November 17, 2018	4.4/11
Ella Mai performs "Boo'd Up" and "Trip".; Carell's The Office co-stars Jenna Fischer, Ed Helms, and Ellie Kemper, his wife Nancy and their children Elisabeth and John, and SNL writer Alison Gates appear in the opening monologue.; Jiggly Caliente and Peppermint appear in the pre-recorded "GPYass".
857	7	Claire Foy	Anderson .Paak	December 1, 2018	4.1/10
Anderson .Paak performs "Tints" with Kendrick Lamar and Tayla Parx and "Who R U?".; Fred Armisen, Alec Baldwin, and Ben Stiller appear as Mohammad bin Salman, Donald Trump, and Michael Cohen, respectively, in the cold open.; "The War in Words" is a new rendition of a sketch from Maya & Marty, with Mikey Day reprising his role from it.; A short montage of Dana Carvey imitating George H. W. Bush, as well as Bush's appearance with Carvey during season 20, is shown at the end of Weekend Update as a tribute to Bush following his death the night before.
858	8	Jason Momoa	Mumford & Sons	December 8, 2018	4.3/10
Mumford & Sons perform "Guiding Light" and "Delta".; Robert De Niro appears as Robert Mueller in the cold open.; A picture of SNL writer and future cast member Bowen Yang appears during "Khal Drogo’s Ghost Dojo".
859	9	Matt Damon	Mark Ronson & Miley Cyrus	December 15, 2018	4.8/12
Mark Ronson and Miley Cyrus perform "Nothing Breaks Like a Heart" and a cover of "Happy Xmas (War Is Over)". For the latter song, Ronson and Cyrus are joined by Sean Lennon, son of original artists John Lennon and Yoko Ono.; In a break with tradition in which the host introduces the musical guests, Pete Davidson introduces Ronson and Cyrus's second performance. It was Davidson's only live appearance on the show (though he did appear in one pre-recorded sketch). Earlier in the day, a post on Davidson's Instagram sparked public concern that he was suicidal.; Alec Baldwin, Robert De Niro, and Ben Stiller appear as Donald Trump, Robert Mueller, and Michael Cohen, respectively, in the cold open. Additionally, Baldwin appears in "Cop Christmas".; This episode attracted negative reactions from Donald Trump, both when the episode originally broadcast, as well as when the episode rebroadcast on March 16, 2019.
860	10	Rachel Brosnahan	Greta Van Fleet	January 19, 2019	4.5/11
Greta Van Fleet performs "Black Smoke Rising" and "You're the One".; Alec Baldwin appears as Donald Trump in the cold open.; John Mulaney appears on Weekend Update with Pete Davidson, who briefly mentions the events from last month when he publicly threatened suicide on Instagram.
861	11	James McAvoy	Meek Mill	January 26, 2019	4.1/10
Meek Mill performs a medley of "Going Bad" and "Uptown Vibes" with Fabolous and "Championships".; Steve Martin appears as Roger Stone in the cold open.; At the end of Weekend Update, Michael Che signs off by saying "I'm Bird Luger" in tribute to recently deceased comedian Kevin Barnett.
862	12	Halsey	Halsey	February 9, 2019	4.7/11
Halsey performs "Without Me" and "Eastside".; Alec Baldwin makes a vocal cameo as Donald Trump in the pre-recorded "Women of Congress".; Aidy Bryant introduces Halsey's first musical performance.; Chris Redd introduces Halsey's second musical performance.
863	13	Don Cheadle	Gary Clark Jr.	February 16, 2019	4.3/11
Gary Clark Jr. performs "Pearl Cadillac" and "This Land".; Alec Baldwin appears as Donald Trump in the cold open.; Before the goodnights, a photo of former stage manager Joe Dicso is shown in silence.
864	14	John Mulaney	Thomas Rhett	March 2, 2019	4.7/11
Thomas Rhett performs "Look What God Gave Her" and "Don't Threaten Me With a Good Time".; Bill Hader and Ben Stiller appear as Jim Jordan and Michael Cohen, respectively, in the cold open. Additionally, Hader appears in "What's That Name?".; Before the goodnights, a photo of wardrobe department member Margaret Karolyi is shown in silence.
865	15	Idris Elba	Khalid	March 9, 2019	4.5/11
Khalid performs "Talk" and "Better".; Gwyneth Paltrow appears as Fifer James on Weekend Update.; The episode's rerun on August 3, 2019 aired the originally Cut for Time "New Cast Member", a short film where Kyle Mooney plays an unknown relative who appears as an unnoticed Saturday Night Live cast member. Also, before the goodnights of this rerun, a photo of former lighting director Phil Hymes was shown. Hymes had died on the Monday of that week.
866	16	Sandra Oh	Tame Impala	March 30, 2019	4.1/10
Tame Impala performs "Patience" and "Borderline".; Alec Baldwin and Robert De Niro appear as Donald Trump and Robert Mueller, respectively, in the cold open.; SNL writer and future cast member Bowen Yang appears as Kim Jong-un in the "Kremlin" sketch.
867	17	Kit Harington	Sara Bareilles	April 6, 2019	4.4/11
Sara Bareilles performs "Fire" and "Saint Honesty" and appears in the pre-recorded "Theresa May" sketch (performing "She Used to Be Mine").; Jason Sudeikis appears as Joe Biden in the cold open.; Harington's Game of Thrones costars Emilia Clarke, John Bradley and his wife Rose Leslie appear in the opening monologue.; Ice-T and Mariska Hargitay appear in a parody of Law & Order: Special Victims Unit in the pre-recorded "GOT Crossovers".
868	18	Emma Stone	BTS	April 13, 2019	3.9/10
BTS performs "Boy with Luv" and "Mic Drop".; Michael Keaton appears as Julian Assange in the cold open.; Pornographic film actor Ty Mitchell appears in a pre-recorded skit called "The Actress."
869	19	Adam Sandler	Shawn Mendes	May 4, 2019	4.8/12
Shawn Mendes performs "If I Can't Have You" and "In My Blood" and appears in the "Sandler Family Reunion" sketch.; Chris Rock appears in the opening monologue with Sandler and Pete Davidson, singing an original song called "I Was Fired".; Jimmy Fallon, Kristen Wiig, and frequent Sandler collaborator Allen Covert appear in "Sandler Family Reunion". Additionally, Wiig appears in "Last Call".; Prior to the goodnights, Sandler performs an unplugged musical tribute to Chris Farley that was originally performed in his 2018 stand-up special Adam Sandler 100% Fresh.; Sandler also does a short impersonation of Farley during the opening monologue.; He also reprises his role as Opera Man during Weekend Update.; Former SNL writers Tim Herlihy, Steve Koren, and Robert Smigel guest-wrote on this episode.; With this episode, Sandler ties Dan Aykroyd's record for the longest gap between being a cast member and returning to host the show. The gap for both actors stands at nine days shy of 24 years. Both actors made guest appearances on the show during the time period after leaving the cast and before returning to host. This record was beaten on December 21, 2019 by Eddie Murphy whose gap was 35 years.
870	20	Emma Thompson	Jonas Brothers	May 11, 2019	4.2/10
Jonas Brothers perform "Sucker", a medley of "Cool" and "Burnin' Up" and appear in "Judge Court".; Tina Fey and Amy Poehler appear in the opening monologue.; In honor of Mother's Day, Pete Davidson's mother, Amy, appears on Weekend Update alongside her son.; Jon Hamm appears during the goodnights; his name came up during the Weekend Update appearance by the Davidsons.
871	21	Paul Rudd	DJ Khaled	May 18, 2019	4.0/10
DJ Khaled performs; a medley consisting of; "Jealous" with Lil Wayne and Big Sean, "You Stay" with Jeremih, Meek Mill, Lil Baby, and J Balvin; a medley consisting of; "Just Us" with SZA; "Weather the Storm" with Mill; "Higher" with John Legend, which was dedicated to the late Nipsey Hussle; and appears in the pre-recorded "Game of Thrones/Grace and Frankie" sketch.; Alec Baldwin and Robert De Niro appear as Donald Trump and Robert Mueller, respectively, in the cold open.; Jacob Anderson, Jane Fonda, and Lily Tomlin appear in the "Game of Thrones/Grace and Frankie" sketch.; Leslie Jones' final episode as a cast member.
