= Saturday Night Live season 42 =

Saturday Night Live
- Season 42
- No. of episodes: 21

Release
- Original network: NBC
- Original release: October 1, 2016 – May 20, 2017

Season chronology
- ← Previous season 41 Next → season 43

The forty-second season of the NBC sketch comedy series Saturday Night Live premiered on October 1, 2016, during the 2016–2017 television season, with host Margot Robbie and musical guest The Weeknd, and concluded on May 20, 2017, with host Dwayne Johnson and musical guest Katy Perry. The season removed two commercial breaks per episode in order to increase programming time. Episode 18 on April 15, 2017, was the first episode to be broadcast live in all four time zones within the contiguous United States. Until this episode, the show aired live only in the Eastern and Central time zones, and was tape-delayed in the Mountain and Pacific time zones.

== History ==
NBC announced prior to the season that SNL would contain 30% less advertisement time starting with this season. Additionally, select NBC advertising clients will be given the opportunity to have their brand appear in promotional sketches, called "pods". Six of these pods will air each season.

== Cast ==
Prior to the start of the season, longtime cast members Taran Killam and Jay Pharoah, as well as featured player Jon Rudnitsky, were released from the cast. Killam, despite having signed a seven-year contract that would have taken him to the end of this season, was dropped from the cast due in part to issues concerning his work directing the film Killing Gunther, which would have limited his time on the show. Following Killam, Pharoah, and Rudnitsky's departures, the show added three new featured players: SNL staff writer and Wild 'n Out alum Mikey Day of The Groundlings, Chicago improviser Alex Moffat, and stand-up comedian and impressionist Melissa Villaseñor. Contrary to rumors, stand-up comedian Chris Redd was not hired this season, but he did join the show as a featured player during the following season. Michael Che, Pete Davidson, and Leslie Jones were all upgraded to repertory status.

On June 24, 2016, Lorne Michaels announced that Che and Colin Jost would continue as the anchors of "Weekend Update". Both were featured on SNL special editions of "Weekend Update" for the Democratic and Republican Conventions.

Though not a member of the cast, it was announced on September 28, 2016, that Alec Baldwin signed through this season to take over impersonating Donald Trump from Darrell Hammond, who continued on as the show's announcer.

This was the final season for longtime cast members Vanessa Bayer (who had been with the show for seven seasons since 2010), Bobby Moynihan (nine seasons since 2008), and Sasheer Zamata (four seasons since 2014).

=== Cast roster ===
**Repertory players**

- Vanessa Bayer
- Beck Bennett
- Aidy Bryant
- **Michael Che**
- Pete Davidson
- Leslie Jones
- **Colin Jost**
- Kate McKinnon
- Kyle Mooney
- Bobby Moynihan
- Cecily Strong
- Kenan Thompson
- Sasheer Zamata

**Featured players**

- Mikey Day
- Alex Moffat
- Melissa Villaseñor

bold denotes "Weekend Update" anchor

== Crew ==
Prior to the start of the season, short film director Matt Villines (of the directing duo Matt & Oz) died of cancer.

=== Writers ===
In August 2016, writing duo Chris Kelly and Sarah Schneider (who had been writing for the show since 2011; and writing supervisors for the past two seasons) were promoted to co-head writers, replacing Rob Klein in the role, while Bryan Tucker remained. In addition, eight new writers were hired for the upcoming season: Kristen Bartlett, Zack Bornstein, Joanna Bradley, Anna Drezen, Julio Torres, Nick Kocher, Brian McElhaney, and Drew Michael. After tweeting a controversial joke about Barron Trump in January 2017, writer Katie Rich was suspended indefinitely.

Also in January 2017, writing supervisor Kent Sublette (who's been writing for the show since 2007; and had been a writing supervisor for the past 3½ seasons, and the sole writing supervisor the first-half of the season) was elevated to head writer bringing the head writing team to four.

This was Kelly and Schneider's final season writing for the show, and their only season as head writers, as the duo (who had been writing for the show for six years since 2011) left the show.

This was also the final season for longtime writer Rob Klein (who Kelly and Schneider replaced as head writer; and who had overall been a writer for 10 years since 2007), as he left the show at the end of the season. It was also Bornstein and Bradley's only season as writers.

== Episodes ==
No. overall	No. in season	Host	Musical guest	Original release date	Ratings/ Share
809	1	Margot Robbie	The Weeknd	October 1, 2016	5.8/15
The Weeknd performs "Starboy" and "False Alarm" and also appears on Weekend Update during a bit titled "The Weeknd Update".; Alec Baldwin takes over impersonating Donald Trump from Darrell Hammond, who continues on as the show's announcer. He appears in the show's cold open, a parody of the first presidential debate.; Hammond and Larry David appear in the Family Feud: Political Edition sketch as Bill Clinton and Bernie Sanders, respectively.; Mikey Day, Alex Moffat and Melissa Villaseñor's first episode as cast members.
810	2	Lin-Manuel Miranda	Twenty One Pilots	October 8, 2016	5.2/13
Twenty One Pilots performs "Heathens" and "Ride".; Alec Baldwin appears as Donald Trump in the cold open.; Tina Fey and Jimmy Fallon appear on Weekend Update.
811	3	Emily Blunt	Bruno Mars	October 15, 2016	5.0/12
Bruno Mars performs "24K Magic" and "Chunky" and appears in "Drive-Thru Window".; Alec Baldwin appears as Donald Trump in both the cold open and the pre-recorded "Melanianade".
812	4	Tom Hanks	Lady Gaga	October 22, 2016	6.1/15
Lady Gaga performs "A-Yo" with Mark Ronson on guitar and "Million Reasons".; Alec Baldwin appears as Donald Trump in the cold open and as a pilot in "Cockpit" .; Hanks makes his debut appearance as David S. Pumpkins in "Haunted Elevator".
813	5	Benedict Cumberbatch	Solange	November 5, 2016	5.8/14
Solange performs "Cranes in the Sky" and "Don't Touch My Hair" with Sampha.; Alec Baldwin appears as Donald Trump in the cold open.; Dana Carvey appears as The Church Lady on Weekend Update.; Chicago Cubs baseball players Anthony Rizzo, Dexter Fowler, and David Ross appear in "Surprise Bachelorette". They also appear with Bill Murray on Weekend Update, singing "Go, Cubs, Go".; A memorial photo of NBC Universal employee John Homer is shown in silence before the goodnights.; During the repeat of this episode on December 31, 2016, an image of Carrie Fisher, who died on December 27, is shown in silence after Weekend Update.
814	6	Dave Chappelle	A Tribe Called Quest	November 12, 2016	6.2/16
A Tribe Called Quest performs "We the People ..." and "The Space Program" with Consequence and Busta Rhymes.; The cold open addresses the aftermath of Donald Trump's unexpected election victory, with Kate McKinnon as Hillary Clinton performing "Hallelujah", a song by Leonard Cohen, who had died earlier that week.; Chris Rock appears in "Election Night".; Donnell Rawlings appears in the pre-recorded "Walking Dead Chappelle's Show", reprising his role as Beautiful.; Chappelle's Show co-creator Neal Brennan guest-wrote on this episode and directed the Walking Dead sketch.
815	7	Kristen Wiig	The xx	November 19, 2016	4.7/12
The xx performs "On Hold" and "I Dare You".; Alec Baldwin and Jason Sudeikis appear as Donald Trump and Mitt Romney, respectively, in the cold open.; Steve Martin and Will Forte appear in the opening monologue.; Bill Hader has a vocal cameo in "Secret Word".
816	8	Emma Stone	Shawn Mendes	December 3, 2016	4.4/11
Shawn Mendes performs "Mercy" and "Treat You Better".; Alec Baldwin appears as Donald Trump in the cold open.; Jennifer Aniston appears on Weekend Update, opposite Vanessa Bayer's impersonation of Aniston's Friends role Rachel Green, and in "Film Screening".
817	9	John Cena	Maren Morris	December 10, 2016	4.8/12
Maren Morris performs "My Church" and "80s Mercedes".; Bryan Cranston appears in the cold open, reprising his role as Walter White from Breaking Bad.
818	10	Casey Affleck	Chance the Rapper	December 17, 2016	4.9/12
Chance the Rapper performs "Finish Line/Drown" with Noname and "Same Drugs" with Francis Farewell Starlite. He also appears in the pre-recorded "Jingle Barack" and the "New York Now" sketch.; Alec Baldwin and John Goodman appear in the cold open, as Donald Trump and Rex Tillerson, respectively, and appear in the opening monologue.; Fred Armisen appears in "Robot Presentation" and as one of "Vladimir Putin's Best Friends from Growing Up" on Weekend Update.; Darryl McDaniels also appears in "Jingle Barack".
819	11	Felicity Jones	Sturgill Simpson	January 14, 2017	4.3/11
Sturgill Simpson performs "Keep It Between the Lines" and "Call to Arms".; Alec Baldwin appears as Donald Trump in the cold open.; Tina Fey appears in the opening monologue.; A memorial photograph to former cast member Tony Rosato, who died on January 10, is shown in silence before the goodnights.
820	12	Aziz Ansari	Big Sean	January 21, 2017	5.1/13
Big Sean performs "Bounce Back" and "Sunday Morning Jetpack".; Neal Brennan directed the Uber film.
821	13	Kristen Stewart	Alessia Cara	February 4, 2017	5.0/13
Alessia Cara performs "Scars to Your Beautiful" and "River of Tears".; Alec Baldwin appears as Donald Trump in the cold open.; Melissa McCarthy appears as Sean Spicer in "Sean Spicer Press Conference".; Stewart accidentally says "fuck" during the monologue.
822	14	Alec Baldwin	Ed Sheeran	February 11, 2017	7.2/18
Ed Sheeran performs "Shape of You" and "Castle on the Hill."; Melissa McCarthy appears as Sean Spicer in the cold open.; Tracy Morgan appears in "Beyoncé's Babies".
823	15	Octavia Spencer	Father John Misty	March 4, 2017	5.2/14
Father John Misty performs "Total Entertainment Forever" and "Pure Comedy."
824	16	Scarlett Johansson	Lorde	March 11, 2017	4.8/13
Lorde performs "Green Light," sings "Liability" with Jack Antonoff on piano, and appears in "Day Without a Woman".; Alec Baldwin appears as Donald Trump in the cold open and in the pre-recorded "Ivanka Fragrance".
825	17	Louis C.K.	The Chainsmokers	April 8, 2017	4.5/12
The Chainsmokers performs "Paris" with Emily Warren and "Break Up Every Night".; Alec Baldwin appears as Donald Trump in the cold open and as both Trump and Bill O'Reilly in The O'Reilly Factor sketch.; An image of Don Rickles, who died on April 6, is shown in silence before the goodnights.
826	18	Jimmy Fallon	Harry Styles	April 15, 2017	7.88 M avg. US viewers
Harry Styles performs "Sign of the Times" and "Ever Since New York" and appears in the opening monologue, as Mick Jagger in "Celebrity Family Feud", and in "Civil War Soldiers".; Alec Baldwin appears as Donald Trump in the cold open.; Nile Rodgers plays guitar during Fallon's opening performance of "Let's Dance".; Melissa McCarthy appears as Sean Spicer in "White House Easter Message", which was actually shot in Los Angeles.; Rachel Dratch reprises her role as Denise from The Boston Teens in "Harvard University".; This is the first SNL episode ever to be broadcast live in all four time zones within the contiguous United States. Previously, the show aired live only in the Eastern and Central time zones, and was tape-delayed in the Mountain and Pacific time zones.
827	19	Chris Pine	LCD Soundsystem	May 6, 2017	6.919 M avg. US viewers
LCD Soundsystem performs "Call the Police" and "American Dream".; Alec Baldwin makes a voiceover cameo appearance in the cold open as Donald Trump.; Long time production designer Akira Yoshimura appears in "Star Trek Lost Episode".
828	20	Melissa McCarthy	HAIM	May 13, 2017	10.337 M avg. US viewers
HAIM performs "Want You Back" and "Little of Your Love" and appears in the opening monologue and in the pre-recorded "Kyle and Leslie".; Alec Baldwin appears as Donald Trump in the cold open and in the Sean Spicer sketch and as himself in the opening monologue.; Blake Lively and Ryan Reynolds appear in the opening monologue.; Steve Martin appears during the goodnights to welcome McCarthy to the Five-Timers Club.
829	21	Dwayne Johnson	Katy Perry	May 20, 2017	8.272 M avg. US viewers
Katy Perry performs "Swish Swish" and "Bon Appétit" with Migos, and appears in "Rap Song" .; A 15-year-old boy named Russell Horning appeared in Perry's first musical performance, performing his signature arm-swinging dance move known as the Floss while wearing a backpack on stage. The performance gained social media attention with many dubbing him as the "Backpack Kid", and his dance move becoming an imitating trend among children, teens, and celebrities.; Other dancers who appeared in Perry's first musical performance included Indya Moore, Jose Gutierez Xtravaganza, Vivacious, Yuhua Hamasaki, Scarlet Envy, and Brita Filter.; Alec Baldwin and Scarlett Johansson appear in the cold open as Donald Trump and Ivanka Trump, respectively, performing a rendition of Leonard Cohen's "Hallelujah". Additionally, Baldwin appears in the opening monologue to welcome Johnson to the Five-Timers Club.; Tom Hanks appears in the opening monologue and as David S. Pumpkins in "Rap Song".; An image of Brad Grey, who died on May 14, is shown in silence after Weekend Update.; Vanessa Bayer, Bobby Moynihan and Sasheer Zamata's final episode as cast members.

== Specials ==
Title	Original release date	Ratings/Share (Adults 18-49)
"Weekend Update at the RNC"	July 20, 2016	N/A
Colin Jost and Michael Che host a special edition of Weekend Update from the 2016 Republican National Convention live on MSNBC. Kate McKinnon appears as Ruth Bader Ginsburg.
"Weekend Update at the DNC"	July 27, 2016	N/A
Colin Jost and Michael Che host a special edition of Weekend Update from the 2016 Democratic National Convention live on MSNBC.
"The 2016 SNL Election Special"	November 7, 2016	2.1/7
Recent political sketches involving the 2016 US presidential election, hosted by Tom Brokaw.
"SNL Thanksgiving Special"	November 23, 2016	1.6/5
Thanksgiving-themed comedy from the Saturday Night Live crew is presented.
"SNL Christmas"	December 14, 2016	1.6/5
Holiday-themed comedy from Saturday Night Live is presented.

== Publicity and controversy ==
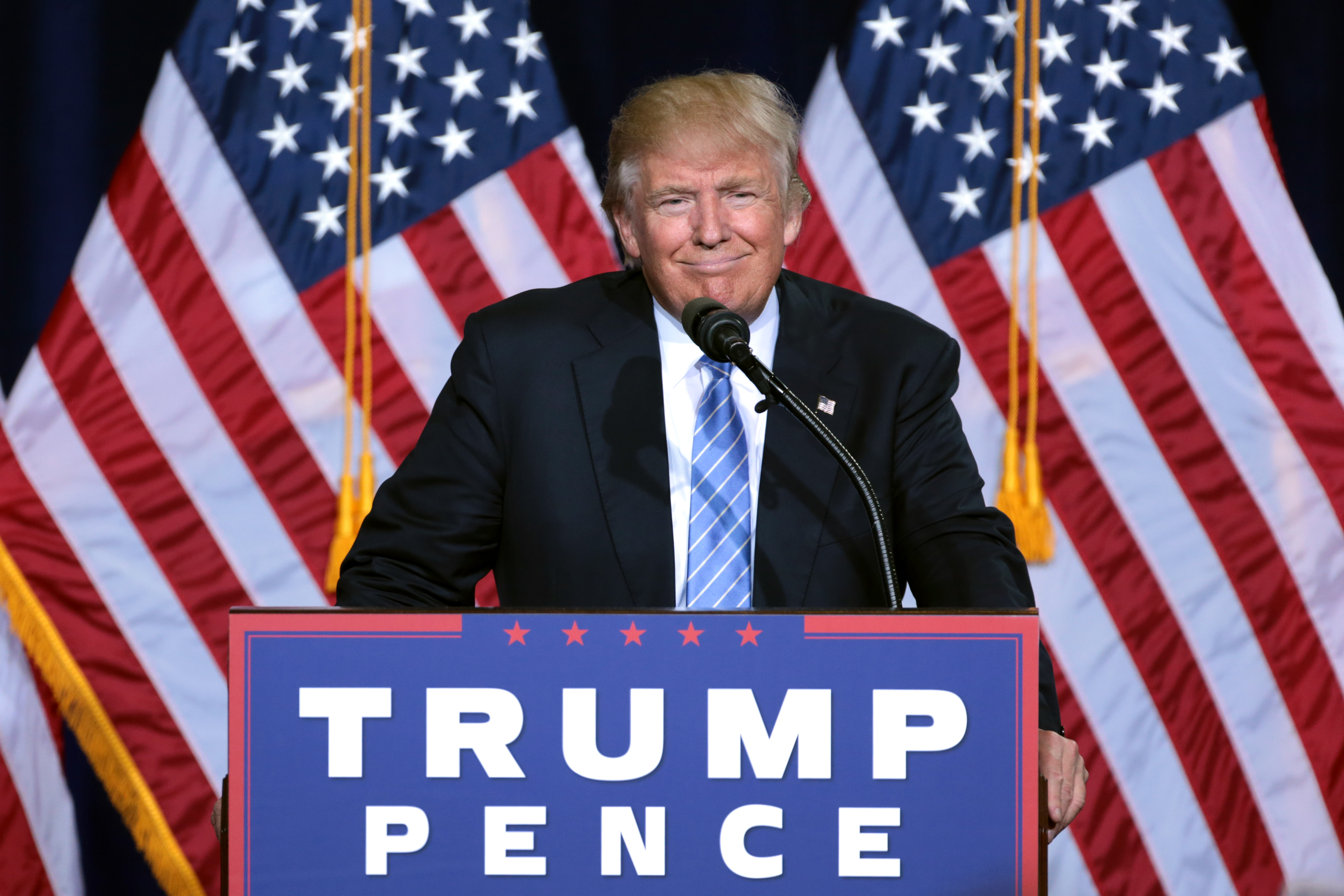
Donald Trump, who became President of the United States during the season, was vocal in his criticism of the show.

The forty-second season of SNL had a larger-than-usual ratings bump, partially due to sketches surrounding the 2016 presidential election and later the presidency of Donald Trump. According to Forbes writer Madeline Berg, the program "had its best season in 24 years, with an average of 11.3 million viewers in live-plus-seven-day ratings, which marks an increase of 26% from [the previous season]." The Dave Chappelle/A Tribe Called Quest episode saw the highest ratings for the show since Donald Trump's hosting the previous season, and highest in the 18-49 rating demographic since December 2013. The show received its best ratings for an October broadcast in eight years with the Tom Hanks/Lady Gaga episode, while the Alec Baldwin/Ed Sheeran episode in February received the best overall ratings for the season thus far, posting its highest metered-market household rating in six years.

Republican candidate Donald Trump — who hosted SNL the previous season and eventually secured the presidency in November — was unhappy with his portrayal on the show by recurring guest Alec Baldwin. On multiple occasions, both before and after winning the election, Trump used Twitter to publicize his thoughts on the impersonation, as well as the show: "Watched Saturday Night Live hit job on me. Time to retire the boring and unfunny show. Alec Baldwin portrayal stinks," he tweeted the morning after the Emily Blunt/Bruno Mars episode on October 16, 2016. "It is a totally one-sided, biased show —nothing funny at all. Equal time for us?", he posted on November 20 after the Kristen Wiig/The xx episode, suggesting the show follow the equal-time rule, despite the presidential race being over. His criticism continued preceding his inauguration: he dubbed it "unwatchable" on December 4, and tweeted "Saturday Night Live is the worst of NBC. Not funny, cast is terrible, always a complete hit job. Really bad television!" after the Felicity Jones/Sturgill Simpson episode on January 15, 2017.
