= Lexi Underwood =

American actor

- Occupations: Actress, Singer
- Years active: 2013–present

Lexi Underwood (born August 28, 2003) is an American actress and singer, best known for her role as Pearl Warren in Little Fires Everywhere. She also played Athena in Will vs the Future, a comedic science fiction series created and executive produced by Tim McKeon and Kevin Seccia, and directed by Joe Nussbaum.

== Career ==
Underwood made her professional theatrical debut in November 2013 at age ten, at the Ford's Theatre in Washington, D.C. in their acclaimed production of Charles Dickens’ A Christmas Carol as Want/Urchin Girl.

On December 15, 2014, Underwood performed in Mister Magoo's Christmas Carol for the Actors Fund of America's one night only benefit concert, which was directed by Peter Flynn and musically directed by John McDaniel. In November 2015, Underwood was cast as Young Nala in the Disney Theatrical Productions’ The Lion King. Underwood performed with the North-American Touring Company from January to August 2015 and covered Broadway in the same role.

On October 14, 2014, Underwood made her television debut on the CBS series Person of Interest in the role of Queen Bee. Underwood went on to appear in Code Black as Emily Campbell, Dr. Campbell's daughter, Henry Danger as Narlee, Walk the Prank as Nice Nancy, Raven's Home as Shannon Reynolds, David S. Pumpkins’ Halloween Special as Paige (voice) animated by Bento Box Entertainment; and Will Vs The Future as Athena, a time traveling, warrior rebel from the future. She has a recurring role on Criminal Minds as Keeley Mendoza-Smith, Emily Prentiss's stepdaughter. Her role in Little Fires Everywhere was called "excellent" by the New York Times, which said, "The scenes between [her mother] Mia and Pearl, both the tender and the angry ones, are the show’s highlights."

== Filmography ==
=== Film ===
Year	Title	Role	Notes
2014	Forgotten Happiness	Alexis	Student Film
2014	Dance-Off	Dancer	
2016	Half-Caste	Amelia	Short film
2017	Girl Minus	Koko	Short film
2017	Dirt	Voice role	
2018	If Not Now, When?	Jillian	
2022	Sneakerella	Kira King	
2024	I Wish You All the Best	Meleika	

=== Television ===
Year	Title	Role	Network	Notes
2014	Person of Interest	Queen Bee	CBS	Episode: "Brotherhood"
2016	The Crooked Man	Young Charlotte	Syfy	TV movie
2016	Code Black	Emily Campbell	CBS	Episode: "Ava Maria"
2017	Henry Danger	Narlee	Nickelodeon	3 episodes
2017	The Nerd Posse	Jennifer		Pilot
2017	Walk the Prank	Nice Nancy	Disney XD	4 episodes
2017	Raven's Home	Shannon Reynolds	Disney Channel	Episode: "You're Gonna Get It"
2017	Will Vs The Future	Athena	Amazon Video	Pilot
2017	The David S. Pumpkins Animated Halloween Special	Paige (voice)	NBC	Saturday Night Live
2018	The Good Doctor	Spirit Garcia	ABC	Episode "Heartfelt”
2019	Family Reunion	Ava	Netflix	4 episodes
2020	Criminal Minds	Keely Mendoza-Smith	CBS	Episode “Rusty”
2020	Little Fires Everywhere	Pearl Warren	Hulu	Main role, 8 episodes
2021	Just Beyond	Ella	Disney+	Episode "We've Got Spirits, Yes We Do"
2022	The First Lady	Malia Obama	Showtime	5 episodes
2023	Cruel Summer	Isabella LaRue	Freeform	Main role (season 2)

== Theater ==
Year	Production	Role	Production company	Notes
2013	A Christmas Carol	Want/Urchin Girl	Ford's Theatre	
2014	Mr. Magoo's Christmas Carol	Belinda Cratchit	Actors Fund of America	
2015	The Lion King (musical)	Young Nala	Disney Theatrical Productions	Gazelle National Tour
