= Is It Cake? =

2022 television game show

- Also known as: Is It Cake, Too? (2023); Is It Cak3? (2024)
- Genre: Game show
- Created by: Dan Cutforth; Jane Lipsitz
- Directed by: Alex Van Wagner; Rich Kim
- Presented by: Mikey Day
- Country of origin: United States
- Original language: English
- No. of seasons: 3 + 5 special seasons
- No. of episodes: 39

Production
- Executive producers: Dan Cutforth; Jane Lipsitz; Nan Strait; Dan Volpe; Andrew Wallace
- Running time: 35–47 minutes
- Production company: Alfred Street Industries

Original release
- Network: Netflix
- Release: March 18, 2022 – present

Is It Cake? is an American game show–style cooking competition television series created by Dan Cutforth and Jane Lipsitz, and hosted by Mikey Day. The series premiered on Netflix on March 18, 2022. Contestants create cakes that replicate common objects in an effort to trick celebrity judges. Winners of each episode receive $5,000 and a chance to win more money by identifying which display of cash is real and which is cake.

The series is based on the viral internet challenge of the same name, popularized on YouTube and TikTok. The challenge involves showing a skillfully decorated cake disguised as a common object or food, and challenging viewers to determine if it is real or a cake replica. Day became fascinated by the challenge after his manager, Michael Goldman, introduced it to him. Although Day has no baking experience or background, he joined the show as host. Day explained the draw of the show is the "human desire... to pick out the 'disguised something'."

In June 2022, Netflix renewed the series for a second season. The second season, titled Is It Cake, Too? was released on June 30, 2023. In January 2024, Netflix renewed the series for a third season, titled Is It Cak3? which was released on March 29, 2024. The series has been renewed for a fourth season.

Beginning in October 2024, Is It Cake? has released a series of themed holiday specials, starting with Is It Cake? Holiday which was released on November 28, 2024. The special features nine all-star bakers from the first three seasons. Mikey Day reprises his role as the host. In the subsequent years to follow, 4 more holiday specials have been released, with the latest being released in 2026: Is It Cake? Halloween was released on October 8, 2025, Is It Cake? Holiday 2 was released on November 25, 2025, Is It Cake? Valentines was released on February 4, 2026 and the latest installment Is It Cake? Halloween 2 was released on October 9, 2026.

== Gameplay ==
Throughout each episode, contestants and celebrity judges are presented with a display of multiple examples of an object, one of which is a cake replica. Three contestants are given eight hours to bake and decorate a cake that replicates the look of an object selected for that episode. Celebrity judges are then presented with three separate groups of five of the same object. Among each of the five-object sets is one of the contestant-baked cakes. If the judges correctly guess which object is actually a cake, its baker is eliminated from that episode. When multiple contestants are able to trick the judges, the winner is selected based on cake quality. The winner of each episode wins $5,000 and is able to win an additional $5,000 if they can correctly identify which of two identical bundles of cash is actually a cake. If they do not correctly identify the cake, the $5,000 is added to the cash bundle round winnings in the next episode. The winners of the three episodes leading up to the finale then compete in the finale to win $50,000. The show does not dismiss any of the eight contestants, who are able to stay during the season and observe. Some not competing in the finale were selected to help support the finalists' baking efforts.

== Production ==
Is It Cake? was created by Dan Cutforth and Jane Lipsitz and is produced by their company, Alfred Street Industries. It is hosted by Mikey Day. On June 2, 2022, the series was renewed for a second season.

The team behind the scenes that make the hyper-realistic cakes in the show's "cake lab" is led by cake artist Monika Stout. They create the hero cakes that the contestants have to guess in the "Find That Cake" and "Cake or Cash" segments.

All of the cakes are made with real ingredients and are edible, but are discarded after production.

== Episodes ==
=== Series overview ===
Season	Episodes	Originally released
1	8	March 18, 2022
2	8	June 30, 2023
3	8	March 29, 2024
Holiday	4	November 28, 2024
Halloween	4	October 8, 2025
Holiday 2	3	November 25, 2025
Valentines	1	February 4, 2026
Halloween 2	3	October 9, 2026

=== Season 1 (2022) ===
No. overall	No. in season	Title	Celebrity judges	Original release date
1	1	"Fast-Food Fakeout"	Daymon Patterson, Fortune Feimster and Ronnie Woo	March 18, 2022
2	2	"Phony Fashion"	Hester Sunshine, Jason Bolden and Michael Yo	March 18, 2022
3	3	"Fake by the Ocean"	Camille Kostek, Chris Witaske and Kellee Edwards	March 18, 2022
4	4	"Imposter in Aisle 5"	Courtney Parchman, Finesse Mitchell and Farley Elliott	March 18, 2022
5	5	"Cake Crashers"	Arturo Castro, Rebecca Black and Jon Gabrus	March 18, 2022
6	6	"Garage Mirage"	Tony Rock, King Princess and Lyric Lewis	March 18, 2022
7	7	"Toying Around"	Brittany Broski, Heidi Gardner and Dan Ahdoot	March 18, 2022
8	8	"Winner Fakes All!"	Loni Love, Bobby Moynihan and Karamo Brown	March 18, 2022

=== Season 2: Is It Cake, Too? (2023) ===
No. overall	No. in season	Title	Celebrity judges	Original release date
9	1	"Everything Is Cake!"	Chrishell Stause, Blake Anderson and Maz Jobrani	June 30, 2023
10	2	"Body By Cake"	Nico Santos, Joel McHale and Ally Love	June 30, 2023
11	3	"Cake University"	Chris Witaske, Kirby Howell-Baptiste and Chloe Fineman	June 30, 2023
12	4	"That 90's Cake"	Anna Camp, Melissa Villaseñor and Joel Kim Booster	June 30, 2023
13	5	"S'more Cake Please"	Brandon Kyle Goodman, Cristela Alonzo and Kate Flannery	June 30, 2023
14	6	"So Fresh and So Cake"	Charli D'Amelio, Heidi D'Amelio and Dixie D'Amelio	June 30, 2023
15	7	"Cake Me Out to the Ballgame"	Jeff Dye, Chiney Ogwumike and Flula Borg	June 30, 2023
16	8	"Winner Cakes All!"	Jade Catta-Preta, Chris Redd and Taylor Tomlinson	June 30, 2023

=== Season 3: Is It Cak3? (2024) ===
No. overall	No. in season	Title	Celebrity judges	Original release date
17	1	"Cake Whodunit"	Jay Pharoah, Lauren Lapkus, London Hughes	March 29, 2024
18	2	"Swimming With Cakes"	Oscar Nunez, Jillian Bell, and Kamie Crawford	March 29, 2024
19	3	"Head-to-Head Battle Royale"	Dulcé Sloan, Chris Witaske, and Liza Koshy	March 29, 2024
20	4	"Knock Knock...Cake Service!"	Michael Ealy, Heather McMahan, and Beck Bennett	March 29, 2024
21	5	"Welcome to the Jungle"	Sam Morril, Danielle Pinnock, and Christina P.	March 29, 2024
22	6	"Cake on Fire"	Sherry Cola, Adam Shapiro, and Storm Reid	March 29, 2024
23	7	"Cakes Ahoy!"	Emma Hernan, Justin Willman, and Lana Condor	March 29, 2024
24	8	"Winner Cakes All!"	Taran Killam, Ego Nwodim, and Chris Kattan	March 29, 2024

=== Is It Cake? Holiday (2024) ===
No. overall	No. in season	Title	Celebrity judges	Original release date
25	1	"All-Star Cakemas!"	Rachel Bloom, Wayne Brady, and Sebastian Maniscalco	November 28, 2024
26	2	"Snow Many Cakes"	Hannah Berner, Tiffany Haddish, and Devon Walker	November 28, 2024
27	3	"Season's Eatings"	James Austin Johnson, Chris Witaske, and Sasheer Zamata	November 28, 2024
28	4	"Tis the Season for a Winner"	Terry Crews, Punkie Johnson, and Randall Park	November 28, 2024

=== Is It Cake? Halloween (2025) ===
No. overall	No. in season	Title	Celebrity judges	Original release date
29	1	"Cakes to Die For!"	Pete Holmes, Chelsea Peretti and Ravi V. Patel	October 8, 2025
30	2	"Gettin' Witchy with It"	Melissa Joan Hart, Jack McBrayer, and Yvonne Orji	October 8, 2025
31	3	"Is It Wonka?"	Harvey Guillén, Kevin Nealon, and Gillian Jacobs	October 8, 2025
32	4	"A Scary Good Winner"	Rachel Feinstein, Ron Funches, and Whitney Cummings	October 8, 2025

=== Is It Cake? Holiday 2 (2025) ===
No. overall	No. in season	Title	Celebrity judges	Original release date
33	1	"A Very Merry Cakemas"	Wendi McLendon-Covey, Dustin Milligan, and Kel Mitchell	November 25, 2025
34	2	"It's a Wonderful Cake"	Kristen Bell, Pierson Fodé, and Lamorne Morris	November 25, 2025
35	3	"A Winner Wonderland"	Lacey Chabert, King Bach, and Michael Urie	November 25, 2025

=== Is It Cake? Valentines (2026) ===
No. overall	No. in season	Title	Celebrity judges	Original release date
36	1	"Baked With Love"	Ashlee Simpson, Evan Ross, Casey Wilson, and David Caspe	February 4, 2026

=== Is It Cake? Halloween 2 (2026) ===
No. overall	No. in season	Title	Celebrity judges	Original release date
37	1	"Nightmare on Cake Street"	Bianca Belair, Lil Rel Howery and Blippi	October 9, 2026
38	2	"Is It Wednesday?"	Joy Sunday, Hunter Doohan and Isaac Ordonez	October 9, 2026
39	3	"Scaring up a Winner"	Cedric Yarbrough, Kristen Schaal and Paul Scheer	October 9, 2026

== Release ==
Is It Cake? was released on Netflix on March 18, 2022, Is It Cake, Too? was released on Netflix on June 30, 2023, Is It Cak3? was released on Netflix on March 29, 2024. and Is It Cake? Holiday Edition was released on Netflix on November 28, 2024.

== Awards and nominations ==
Year	Award	Category	Nominee	Result	Ref.
2022	Critics' Choice Real TV Awards	Best Culinary Show	Is It Cake?	Nominated	
2024	Kids' Choice Awards	Favorite Reality Show	Is It Cake?	Nominated	

== See also ==
- Bake Squad
- Baking Impossible
- Nailed It!
