= The David S. Pumpkins Halloween Special =

2017 television special

- Title card
- Based on: "Haunted Elevator (featuring David S. Pumpkins)"
- Written by: Mikey Day; Bobby Moynihan; Streeter Seidell
- Directed by: Don Roy King
- Starring: Tom Hanks; Mikey Day; Bobby Moynihan; Streeter Seidell; Joaquin Obradors; Spencer Moss; Lexi Underwood; Steve Higgins; Cecily Strong; Melissa Villaseñor
- Narrated by: Peter Dinklage
- Theme music composer: Eli Brueggemann; Mikey Day; Streeter Seidell
- Composer: Mark Mothersbaugh

Production
- Executive producers: Chris Meledandri; Lorne Michaels
- Producers: Erin Doyle; Mikey Day; Bobby Moynihan; Streeter Seidell; Scott Greenberg; Joel Kuwahara; James Merrill
- Editors: Carlos Almonte; Ryan Scott Wick
- Running time: 21 minutes
- Production companies: SNL Studios; Broadway Video; Bento Box Entertainment

Original release
- Network: NBC
- Release: October 28, 2017

The David S. Pumpkins Halloween Special is an animated Halloween television special that aired on NBC on October 28, 2017. It stars Tom Hanks as Saturday Night Live character David S. Pumpkins. The 21-minute special was written by and also features Mikey Day, Bobby Moynihan, and Streeter Seidell. Peter Dinklage narrates the story, which follows a brother and sister who go trick-or-treating, meet Pumpkins and catch the troublemakers who had disrupted Halloween.

== Plot ==
The Halloween Special starts and ends with live-action segments directed by Don Roy King featuring David S. Pumpkins (Hanks), flanked by two skeletons (Day and Moynihan). The animated part is a man, Kevin (Dinklage), talking about the time he met Pumpkins as a kid.

Kevin and his sister Dotty walk around during Halloween, eventually finding themselves in a pumpkin patch. They choose to take home an ugly pumpkin, which turns out to be magical; Pumpkins and the skeletons appear out of an elevator. He shows them to his transport, shaped like a strawberry, and they start trick-or-treating. One of the neighborhood children is dressed as Kevin Roberts, an SNL character portrayed by Larry David whose sketch has traits similar to Pumpkins' "Haunted Elevator."

A mysterious Raincoat Man has been stealing all the children's candy, so Pumpkins decides to intervene. They try to confront the Raincoat Man in a haunted house, who turns out to be three pre-teens who had bullied Kevin. Pumpkins returns the candy using magical floating pumpkins, and he and the skeletons depart.

== Voice cast ==
- Tom Hanks as David S. Pumpkins
- Peter Dinklage as Narrator/Adult Kevin
- Bobby Moynihan as Fat Skeleton
- Mikey Day as Left Skeleton
- Spencer Moss as Dotty
- Lexi Underwood as Paige
- Streeter Seidell as Troy Ditmeyer
- Cecily Strong as Debbie Miller
- Melissa Villaseñor
- Steve Higgins

Before Dinklage was cast as Narrator/Adult Kevin, Pete Holmes, Chris Parnell, Jon Cryer, Eric McCormack, Bob Saget, and Zachary Levi were all considered.

== Production ==
The character David S. Pumpkins was created for the October 22, 2016, episode of season 42 of Saturday Night Live, hosted by Hanks. The sketch "Haunted Elevator (featuring David S. Pumpkins)" became widely shared, with over 10 million views on YouTube. The staff noted that the character was particularly popular with children leading to the idea of an animated special. In writing the special the team sought to keep the mystery of the character that was present in the original sketch, with Day noting "There was talk about David Pumpkins’s universe, but we thought his appeal was in, the less you know about him, the better."

NBC announced on September 28, 2017, that The Halloween Special was in the works. Hanks also hinted earlier that he would reprise his role as Pumpkins by posting an image of the front of the script on social media. It was produced by SNL creator Lorne Michaels and animated by Bento Box Entertainment with a score by Mark Mothersbaugh. It was written by Day, Moynihan, and Seidell.

== Release and reception ==
The special debuted on October 28, 2017, at 11:30 PM (ET), in Saturday Night Live's usual time slot, three days before Halloween.

It received mixed reviews. Dennis Perkins wrote for The A.V. Club that there was "not enough inspiration or enough snap to the jokes" and that its "oddness ... deflates long before its running time is up." Slate's Matthew Dessem wrote that "just like they planned it, the whole thing was terrible." Mallory Carra wrote on Bustle that "David S. Pumpkins is still our Halloween hero in 2017," and noted the large Twitter response, mostly positive, about Dinklage's participation.
