= Miracles (Insane Clown Posse song) =

Song by Insane Clown Posse

Single by Insane Clown Posse

from the album Bang! Pow! Boom!
- Released: 2010
- Recorded: September 2008 – July 2009; Fun House Studio
- Genre: Rap rock
- Length: 5:13
- Label: Psychopathic
- Songwriters: Joseph Bruce, Joseph Utsler, Mike E. Clark
- Producer: Mike E. Clark

Insane Clown Posse singles chronology
"In Yo Face" (2009)	"Miracles" (2010)	"Juggalo Island" (2010)

Music video
- "Miracles" on YouTube

"Miracles" is a song written by the American hip hop duo Insane Clown Posse and record producer Mike E. Clark. It was released as a single from the duo's 2009 album Bang! Pow! Boom!. A music video was produced for the 2010 reissue of the album, dubbed the "Nuclear Edition". The song's lyrics focus on things experienced in everyday life, displaying an appreciation for them, and perceiving them as miraculous and outside of the laws of physics.

The song sparked a number of Internet memes, and was parodied on Saturday Night Live and by The Lonely Island in the song "Incredible Thoughts".

== Music and lyrics ==
Inspiration for the song's lyrics came via the Internet generation and group members Violent J and Shaggy 2 Dope raising children. In response to both modern jadedness and their children experiencing wonders of the world for the first time, the group wanted to write a song about natural phenomena humans experience in life which often go unacknowledged. The closing lyrics encourage listeners to take time to look at the world and "appreciate the things that life has to offer". According to Violent J, "What's a shame is how people walk around blind to it all. They lost their spirit about everything. If you can't even see the miracle in animals, then you must have never truly loved a pet." Despite verbally calling scientists "liars" in the song, he afterward stated that what he meant was that scientific explanations can sometimes kill the intriguing mysteries of the world, such as how ancient pyramids were made. Violent J admits that the song's lyrics discuss "things [... that] may not be actual miracles. They may have scientific facts explaining them [...] But nonetheless, these things are still incredible [...] and they should be appreciated." He added that the group's use of the word 'miracle' was intended to mean "something fuckin' amazing and incredible, [... a] special, awesome event, [...] a great, wonderful thing."

The lyrics focus on introspective themes which critics considered to be uncommon in Insane Clown Posse's music; however, Violent J states that these themes are important in the duo's work, and reveal their depth. In response to accusations that the group has changed its style and gone soft, Violent J calls the song "classic ICP," noting that the group has always included one or two deep and meaningful songs on every album, and that this is just the first time that they've created a video for one of those songs. Several reviewers have suggested that the song contains an anti-science message, as the song literally states that scientists profess lies. Violent J disputes the claim, asserting that "the [song's] concept is about appreciating everything in this world. It's not about God; [...] religion; [.. or] science." Joseph Laycock of Religion Dispatches suggests that rather than rejecting science, the song disapproves of disenchantment.

The song's music is built around an ascending synthesizer melody, and climaxes with an electric guitar solo performed by Mike E. Clark, and beatboxing by Shaggy 2 Dope.

== Music video ==
A special effect from the music video, which became viral

The music video for the song debuted on April 6, 2010, as part of the "Nuclear Edition" reissue of Bang! Pow! Boom!. The video's green screen sequences were directed by Paul Andresen, with post-production being completed in Michigan. The video has received over 19 million views on YouTube.

On April 17, Saturday Night Live aired a sketch that parodied the "Miracles" music video. In the sketch, fictional personalities DJ Supersoak (played by Jason Sudeikis) and Lil' Blaster (played by Nasim Pedrad) debuted a fictional music video by the Thrilla Killa Klownz called "Magical Mysteries" as part of the Under Underground Records' "Underground Rock Minute". In the fictional video, Ryan Phillippe and Bobby Moynihan rap about things such as "where the sun hides at night" and how blankets work. Saturday Night Live had previously parodied Psychopathic Records in 2009.

Insane Clown Posse called the "Miracles" parody "a huge honor". Violent J called the parody "off the hook hilarious". Shaggy noted that Coolio initially reacted unfavorably towards "Amish Paradise", "Weird Al" Yankovic's parody of the rapper's song "Gangsta's Paradise", and stated "If Weird Al wanted to do one of our songs, I'd be like, 'Hell yeah.' To me, it's the same thing with Saturday Night Live."

The music video also appeared in the webcomic Homestuck.

== Reception ==
Adam Graham of The Detroit News disliked the song, writing that "hearing this song makes you wish ICP would stick to serial killing". Slate writer Jonah Weiner praised the song's music, but panned its lyrics. The A.V. Club writer Nathan Rabin described the song as "fucking insane". A Chicago Tribune critic mocked the song's lyrics saying, "I'm glad that when my kids get strep throat, their doctor doesn't say, '(Bleeping) antibiotics, how do they work?'" James Montgomery described the music video as "a psychedelic special effects extravaganza that is sometimes really literal... and sometimes just confusing." Pitchfork included "Miracles" on their list of The Top Music Videos of 2010.

== "Magnets" meme ==
The song's lyric "Fucking magnets, how do they work?" became an Internet meme. The following line, "and I don't want to talk to a scientist, y'all motherfuckers lyin', and gettin' me pissed" also drew ire from scientifically-minded Internet users. Scientists created blog entries to teach Insane Clown Posse fans and even did so in person.
