= Brother Nature (film) =

- Theatrical release poster
- Directed by: Osmany Rodriguez; Matt Villines
- Written by: Mikey Day; Cameron Fay; Taran Killam
- Produced by: Lorne Michaels
- Starring: Taran Killam; Bobby Moynihan; Gillian Jacobs; Kumail Nanjiani; Kenan Thompson; Rita Wilson; Bill Pullman
- Cinematography: David Robert Jones
- Edited by: Kelly Lyon
- Music by: Mark Maxwell
- Production companies: Broadway Video; Insurge Pictures; Samuel Goldwyn Films
- Distributed by: Paramount Pictures
- Release date: September 9, 2016
- Running time: 97 minutes
- Country: United States
- Language: English

Brother Nature is a 2016 American comedy film directed by Osmany Rodriguez and Matt Villines, from a screenplay by Mikey Day, Cameron Fay, and Taran Killam. It stars Killam, Bobby Moynihan, Gillian Jacobs, Rita Wilson and Bill Pullman. The film was released in a limited release and through video on demand on September 9, 2016, by Insurge Pictures and Samuel Goldwyn Films.

The film was originally titled Brother in Laws.

It is the last film by Insurge Pictures, as the company was absorbed into Paramount Pictures the year before the film's release.

== Plot ==
Straight-laced Roger hopes to propose to his girlfriend during a weekend family getaway, but his overbearing would-be brother-in-law might get in the way.

== Cast ==
- Taran Killam as Roger Fellner
- Bobby Moynihan as Todd Dotchman
- Gillian Jacobs as Gwen Turley
- Rita Wilson as Cathy Turley
- Bill Pullman as Jerry Turley
- Kumail Nanjiani as Riggleman
- Kenan Thompson as Miesha
- Rachael Harris as Aunt Pam
- Sarah Burns as Margie Turley
- Sarah Baker as Shannon
- David Wain as Uncle Mel
- Ellen Bloodworth as Grandma Hibby
- Giancarlo Esposito as Congressman Frank McClaren
- Jonah Kellams as Cousin Cody
- Ethan Harmon as Cousin Spencer
- Julian F. Grijalva as George Washington
- Mikey Day as Thomas Jefferson
- Tim Robinson as Ben Franklin
- Sam Grey as John Adams
- Noor Shic as Riggleman's Mom
- Mike O'Brien as Nick
- Aidy Bryant as Dana Curlman
- Benny Morinishi as Micah

== Production ==
In August 2014, it was announced Taran Killam, Bill Pullman, Rachael Harris, Rita Wilson, David Wain, and Bobby Moynihan had joined the cast of the film, with Matt Villines and Osmany Rodriguez directing from a screenplay by Killam, Cameron Fay, and Mikey Day, and Lorne Michaels serving as producer under his Broadway Video banner.

== Release ==
The film was released in a limited release and through video on demand on September 9, 2016.
