= Heidi Gardner =

American comedian (born 1983)

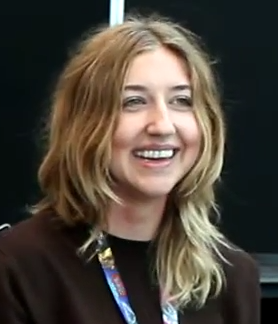
- Gardner in 2016
- Born: Heidi Lynn Gardner; July 27, 1983 (age 43); Kansas City, Missouri, U.S.
- Occupations: Actress; comedian; writer
- Years active: 2011–present
- Spouse: Zeb Wells (m. 2010; div. 2023)

Heidi Lynn Gardner (born July 27, 1983) is an American actress, comedian, and writer. She was a cast member on Saturday Night Live, an NBC sketch comedy series for eight seasons from season 43 in 2017 until season 50 in 2025. She was promoted to repertory status on the show in 2019.

== Early life ==
Heidi Gardner was born and raised in Kansas City, Missouri. She has an older brother, Justin. She worked part-time at the Tivoli Theater in Kansas City as a child, where she did everything "from selling tickets to making popcorn". She credited the theater as "setting the tone in her life". She was not interested in acting as a teenager, only performing on stage as a flautist for the school band and doing comedy sketches in school talent shows. She graduated from Notre Dame de Sion, an all-girls Catholic high school in southern Kansas City in 2001. In her senior year, her classmates voted her "most likely to be a cast member of Saturday Night Live".

After graduation, Gardner followed in a friend's footsteps and enrolled at the University of Kansas in Lawrence for two years before transferring to the University of Missouri in Columbia for a semester. At the time, she was uninterested in school and often skipped classes, and she discovered a fondness for cutting hair.

== Career ==
At age 21, Gardner dropped out of college and left Kansas City for Los Angeles, where she worked at a hair salon for nine years. Before moving, she saved $600 over a summer. A friend encouraged her to attend a performance at The Groundlings theater, where she became inspired to become an actress. Lacking acting experience, Gardner enrolled in community workshops to learn the basics of improvisation. Once she was comfortable performing, Gardner auditioned for the Groundlings basic class and was accepted.

In 2014, Gardner joined the Sunday Company and in 2015 after a promotion to the Main Company, she quit her job as a hairstylist to focus on acting. During that time, she became a voice actress, regularly appearing on animated series including Bratz, SuperMansion, and Mike Tyson Mysteries. In 2017, she joined the cast of Saturday Night Live (SNL) along with Luke Null and Chris Redd for its forty-third season, as featured players.

After her first year on SNL, Gardner was hired to play Leonor in the Ben Falcone-directed film Life of the Party, alongside Melissa McCarthy, Falcone's wife. On August 28, 2019, TVLine reported that Gardner would have a guest role on the NBC comedy series Superstore, playing Dina Fox's nemesis Colleen who is transferred to Store 1217 after Cloud 9's Bel-Ridge location is shut down. In 2019, Gardner made her stage debut in Michael Frayn's Noises Off at The Cape Playhouse in Dennis, Massachusetts on Cape Cod. That same year, she and SNL castmate Redd were promoted to Repertory Status for SNL's 45th season.

By the time of season 47, which was her fifth season on SNL, she still felt like "the new kid", because by that point, outside of Leslie Jones, most of the senior cast members from her first season were still there. That was due in part to the COVID-19 pandemic preventing those senior cast members from leaving the show earlier. By the time season 47 had concluded, and season 48 was underway, several senior cast members (such as Kate McKinnon, Pete Davidson, and Cecily Strong – who left midway through season 48) had left the show, and Gardner (who, by that point, was in her sixth season) talked about being grateful for now being one of the senior cast members, and had enjoyed being "passed the ball more."

During her eight-year tenure on Saturday Night Live, Gardner broke character during her seventh season on the show, while playing a NewsNation host named Bobbi Moore in a Beavis and Butt-Head-themed sketch. Vulture magazine described the moment as breaking in "spectacularly charming fashion". Gardner departed the show in 2025, after the conclusion of the show's 50th season. In 2026, Gardner spoke with Mike Birbiglia about how her sketches were often cut from the show.

=== Recurring characters on Saturday Night Live ===
- Angel (Every Boxer's Girlfriend from Every Movie About Boxing Ever), a troubled woman who tries to give "Weekend Update's Good News Report" but inevitably derails into melodramatic rants about her boyfriend's dangerous boxing career
- Bailey Gismert, a teen film critic who gives awkward reviews
- Brie Bacardi, one half of a shallow couple always on the brink of an argument, who runs a relationship-themed Instagram account with her boyfriend Nico Slobkin (Mikey Day)
- Baskin Johns, a woman who works for Goop and gets worried that she will be fired by Gwyneth Paltrow
- Mandy, a cousin of a celebrity who shames their movie careers
- Sandy, a joyful cook on a baking reality competition show who is qualified and skilled but often gets passed over as a winner for more poorly-constructed and eccentric cakes
- Tamra, an intern who pitches Instagram captions for Mattel's Barbie account
- Deidre, one half of a couple who describes their vacation to their friends, naïvely misinterpreting poor experiences as prestigious culture
- Crystal (Your Co-Worker Who is Extremely Busy Doing Seemingly Nothing), who comes to Weekend Update to complain about her job, although it's unclear what she actually does

== Personal life ==
Gardner is a fan of the Kansas City Chiefs and the Kansas City Royals. From 2010 to 2023, she was married to Marvel Comics writer Zeb Wells, whom she met while she was a member of the Groundlings.

As of 2024, Gardner resided in Leawood, Kansas, in a mid-century modern house she purchased in 2021.

Gardner was in a relationship with music video and film director Ray Tintori at the time of his death in 2026.

== Performances and works ==
Film

| Year | Title | Role | Notes |
|---|---|---|---|
| 2014 | Dibs! | Erica | |
| 2018 | Life of the Party | Leonor | |
| 2018 | Making Babies | Meg | |
| 2019 | Otherhood | Erin | |
| 2022 | Hustle | Kat Merrick | |
| 2022 | Puss in Boots: The Last Wish | Last Baker | Voice role |
| 2023 | Leo | Eli's mom | Voice role |
| 2026 | Scary Movie | Agent Berger | |
| TBA | Transcending † | TBA | Post-production |
| TBA | Judgment Day † | TBA | Post-production |
| TBA | Untitled Stephen Merchant film † | TBA | Filming |

Television

| Year | Title | Role | Notes |
|---|---|---|---|
| 2017, 2019 | Mike Tyson Mysteries | Old Woman, Jennifer | 2 episodes |
| 2017–2025 | Saturday Night Live | Various | Seasons 43–50 |
| 2019 | The Other Two | Mona | Episode: "Chase Turns Fourteen" |
| 2019 | Veep | Amanda White | Episode: "Discovery Weekend" |
| 2019 | Alien News Desk | Tuva Van Void (voice) | 12 episodes |
| 2019 | American Dad! | Various voices | Episode: "Lost Boys" |
| 2019 | Superstore | Colleen | Episode: "Forced Hire" |
| 2020 | Unbreakable Kimmy Schmidt | Jenny | Special: "Kimmy vs the Reverend" |
| 2021 | Close Enough | Becca (voice) | Episode: "Houseguest From Hell" |
| 2021 | Crank Yankers | Herself (voice) | Episode: "Chelsea Peretti, Heidi Gardner & J.B. Smoove" |
| 2021–2022 | That Damn Michael Che | Various | 2 episodes |
| 2022 | Is It Cake? | Herself (Judge) | Episode: "Toying Around" |
| 2022 | Girls5eva | Cara | Episode: "Album Mode" |
| 2023–2024 | Shrinking | Grace | 10 episodes |
| 2025 | You | Kim Kramer | Episode: "#JoeGoldberg" |
| 2025 | Tales of the Teenage Mutant Ninja Turtles | Maude (voice) | 2 episodes |
| 2026 | The Fall and Rise of Reggie Dinkins | Tisha Basmati | |

=== Stage ===
| Year | Title | Role | Locations |
|---|---|---|---|
| 2019 | Noises Off | Brooke Ashton/Vicki | The Cape Playhouse |
| 2025 | All Out: Comedy About Ambition | Various | Nederlander Theatre |

Web

| Year | Title | Role | Notes |
|---|---|---|---|
| 2015 | Adult Wednesday | Hairdresser | Episode: "The Haircut" |
| 2015 | Bratz | Yasmin (voice) | 8 episodes |
| 2015–19 | SuperMansion | Cooch, Various voices | 46 episodes |
| 2016 | CollegeHumor Originals | Patient | Episode: "Why Are My Nipples Pixelated?" |

Audio

| Year | Title | Role | Notes |
|---|---|---|---|
| 2020 | Heads Will Roll | Various voices | 10 episodes |
| 2021 | Batman: The Audio Adventures | Harley Quinn, Miss Tuesday | |

=== Writing credits ===
Web

| Year | Title | Notes |
|---|---|---|
| 2015 | Bratz | 3 episodes |
| 2015–17 | SuperMansion | 11 episodes |
