= Chris Redd =

American comedian and actor (born 1985)

- Redd in 2026
- Born: Christopher Jerell Redd; March 25, 1985 (age 41); St. Louis, Missouri, U.S.

Comedy career
- Years active: 2005–present
- Medium: Stand-up, television, film
- Genre: Sketch comedy
- Subjects: American culture; pop culture
- Website: iamchrisredd.com

Christopher Jerell Redd (born March 25, 1985) is an American comedian and actor. After several years performing stand-up comedy, Redd was hired to join the cast of the NBC sketch comedy series Saturday Night Live ahead of the show's 43rd season in 2017, and serving as a cast member for five seasons until 2022. For his work on the show, he won a Primetime Emmy Award for Outstanding Original Music and Lyrics in 2018 for co-writing the SNL song "Come Back Barack".

He also appeared in the film Popstar: Never Stop Never Stopping (2016) and television sitcoms Disjointed (2017–2018), and Kenan (2021–2022).

== Early life ==
Redd was born on March 25, 1985, in St. Louis, Missouri, and moved to Naperville, a suburb of Chicago, at age eight. According to Redd, he had a childhood stutter that he overcame by learning how to rap. He attended Naperville schools, including Gregory Middle School and Neuqua Valley High School, and later attended community college in Elgin, Illinois, where he took his first improvisational theater class.

== Career ==
Redd briefly pursued a career as a rapper, while working as a server at Olive Garden, but switched to sketch comedy in 2009 after being inspired by the work of Steve Carell and realizing that he enjoyed and thrived more in improvisational comedy. He took comedy classes at Jokes & Notes, a now-closed comedy club in Chicago. Redd joined the comedy group The Second City, and was a member of its touring company. He moved to Los Angeles in 2016 to further pursue an acting career, and made his film debut as Hunter the Hungry, an underground rapper, in the 2016 mockumentary Popstar: Never Stop Never Stopping. Redd co-starred in the 2017–2018 Netflix comedy series Disjointed, in which he played the role of Dank, a stoner.

After a previous unsuccessful audition for Saturday Night Live, Redd joined the show's cast as a featured player for season 43, alongside fellow newcomers Heidi Gardner and Luke Null. In 2018, Redd won a Primetime Emmy Award for Outstanding Original Music and Lyrics for writing the song "Come Back Barack", which lamented former president Barack Obama's departure from the White House and aired during Chance the Rapper's episode on November 18, 2017. The award was shared with co-writers Kenan Thompson and Will Stephen, and composer Eli Brueggemann. Redd and Gardner were promoted to repertory status in 2019, ahead of SNL's 45th season. His celebrity impressions on the show included U.S. Senator Cory Booker, Kanye West, Sterling K. Brown, and Mayor Eric Adams. Redd left SNL in 2022, after the show's 47th season.

Redd's debut stand-up comedy album, But Here We Are, was released by Comedy Central Records in March 2019. Between 2021 and 2022, Redd co-starred in the comedy television series Kenan, alongside his SNL castmate Kenan Thompson. Their ongoing roles in both shows resulted in frequent travel between New York City, where SNL is filmed, and Los Angeles, where Kenan was filmed. Redd appeared in the 2023 film Spinning Gold as Frankie Crocker, a disc jockey for the first black music radio station in New York. Other projects include the Lorne Michaels–produced comedy series Bust Down, in which Redd plays a discontented casino employee, and a stand-up comedy special on HBO Max. In 2025, Redd joined the fourth season of Power Book III: Raising Kanan.

== Personal life ==
In October 2022, Redd was assaulted by an unknown assailant outside of a comedy club in New York. He was then taken to the hospital, and later released. Redd admitted in January 2026 that, while abusing Adderall and Xanax on SNL, he began a relationship with Kenan Thompson's wife, who had previously separated from Thompson in 2022. He implied that this relationship was related to his subsequent assault in October 2022, saying "When I got punched in the face...This time it felt like, fair. Fair enough." He further claimed that there was a "drug issue at SNL" when he began working on the show and that he sold drugs to castmates, though he later walked back the latter claim.

== Other activities ==
In June 2020, Redd and fellow The Second City alumna Lisa Beasley raised over $360,000 on GoFundMe to cover the medical costs of racial justice protesters who had contracted COVID-19. After Second City CEO Andrew Alexander resigned during the same month over allegations of institutional racism within the group, Redd and 18 other black alumni and current employees signed an open letter calling for an independent investigation into the allegations.

== Filmography ==
=== Film ===
Year	Title	Role	Notes	Ref.
2016	Popstar: Never Stop Never Stopping	Hunter the Hungry		
2017	Handsome	Detective Gunner		
2018	A Futile and Stupid Gesture	Skeptical Black Man		
2018	Deep Murder	Jace		
2019	Joker	Comedy Club Emcee		
2020	Scare Me	Carlo		
2020	Vampires vs. the Bronx	Andre		
2023	Spinning Gold	Frankie Crocker		
2023	Candy Cane Lane	Lamplighter Gary		
2025	Merv	Vice Principal Desmond		
TBA	What the F*ck Is My Password	TBA	Filming	

=== Television ===
Year	Title	Role	Notes	Ref(s).
2014	Chicago P.D.	Carl	Episode: "Thirty Balloons"	
2015	Empire	Roger	2 episodes	
2016	Lonely and Horny	Omar	4 episodes	
2016	Comedy Bang! Bang!	The Cleaning Crew Rapper	Episode: "Krysten Ritter Wears a Turtleneck and Black Boots"	
2017	Love	Justin	2 episodes	
2017	Detroiters	Donut	Episode: "Smilin' Jack"	
2017	Sofia the First	Singe (voice)	Episode: "The Royal Dragon"	
2017	Wet Hot American Summer: Ten Years Later	Mason	2 episodes	
2017–2018	Disjointed	Steven "Dank" Dankerson	18 episodes	
2017	Comedy Central Stand-Up Presents	Himself	Stand-up special	
2017–2022	Saturday Night Live	Himself/Various	Repertory player Primetime Emmy Award for Outstanding Original Music and Lyrics (2018)	
2017	Will & Grace	Alvin	Episode: "Emergency Contact"	
2018	Teachers	Darnell	Episode: "For Poorer or Poorer"	
2019	Star vs. the Forces of Evil	Additional voices	Episode: "Junkin' Janna/A Spell with No Name"	
2019	Big Mouth	Additional voice	2 episodes	
2019	Laff Mobb's Laff Tracks	Himself	Episode: "Chris Redd Headlines"	
2021–2022	Kenan	Gary Williams	Main role	
2022	Bust Down	Chris	Main role; also co-creator, executive producer, and star	
2022	The Simpsons	Trevor McBride (voice)	Episode: "Girls Just Shauna Have Fun"	
2023	Is It Cake?	Himself / Judge	Episode: "Winner Cakes All!"	
2024	Resurrected Rides	Host	8 Episodes	
2024	Very Important People	Jukebox	Episode: "Jukebox"	
2025	Power Book III: Raising Kanan	Early Tyler	7 episodes	

== Discography ==
Year	Title	Notes	Ref.
2019	But Here We Are	Stand-up comedy album	
