= Matt Villines =

American film director (1977–2016)

Matt Villines (June 5, 1977 – July 9, 2016) was an American film and television director, known for his work in comedy as one half of the comedic directing team Matt & Oz, with professional partner, Osmany Rodriguez.

== Early life and education ==
Villines was born in Tulsa, Oklahoma, on June 5, 1977. He graduated from Bishop Kelley High School in 1995 and received his bachelor's degree in 2000 from the University of Oklahoma. Villines then moved to Los Angeles, where he enrolled at the Los Angeles Film School.

== Career ==
Villines met his directing partner, Osmany "Oz" Rodriguez, while both were students at the Los Angeles Film School. The duo soon collaborated to create comedic video shorts, first for an early incarnation of SuperDeluxe.com before joining Funny Or Die. Known professionally as Matt & Oz, their Funny Or Die short digital films included "Charlie Sheen's Winning Recipes," "The Wire: The Musical" (2012), and "The New Guy on New Girl with Zooey Deschanel," as well as a parody of parody of the Bing Crosby and David Bowie duet, "Peace on Earth."

Villines and Rodriguez were hired by Saturday Night Live in 2012 to direct pre-taped digital shorts. Villines shorts at SNL included "(Home for the Holidays) Twin Bed," which was nominated for an Emmy Award in 2014. The directing duo's other SNL Digital Shorts included "Darrell's House," "Sad Mouse," "Monster Pals," "Back Home Ballers," and "Jay Z Story." Their memorable 2015 short, "A Thanksgiving Miracle," features family's Thanksgiving arguments interrupted by Adele's "Hello."

Villines and Rodriguez directed Taran Killam in the film, Brother Nature, which was produced by Lorne Michaels. The film, which finished production in 2014, was released on-demand in September 2016.

== Death ==
Villines was diagnosed with advanced kidney cancer in 2014. He died on July 9, 2016, at the age of 39. He was survived by his wife, Linda, whom he married shortly before his diagnosis; his parents, Maggie and Elton Villines; and his sisters.
