= Mikey Day =

American actor and comedian (born 1980)

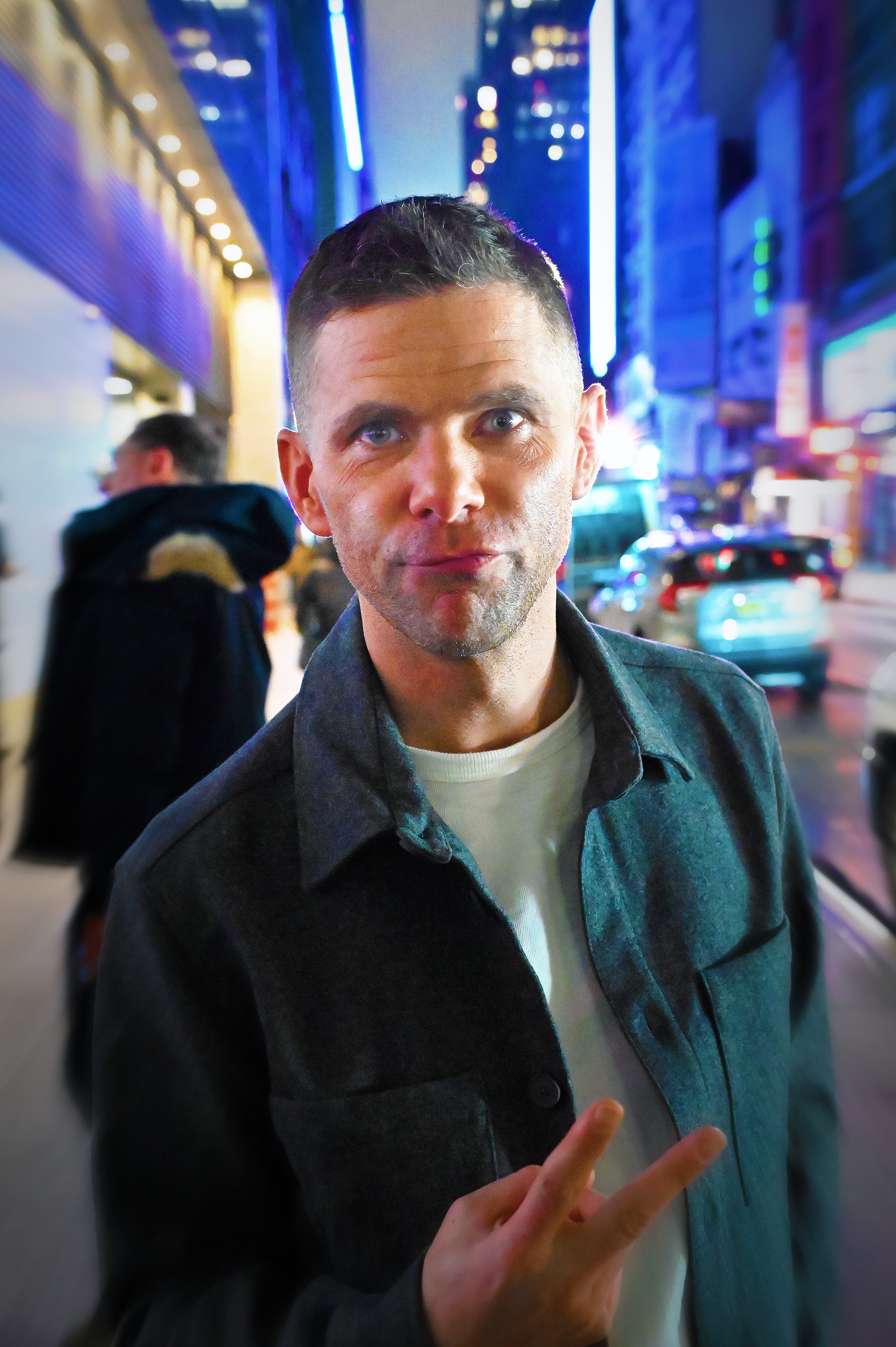
- Day in 2024
- Born: Michael William Day; March 20, 1980 (age 46); Orange, California, U.S.
- Education: University of California, Los Angeles (BA)
- Occupations: Actor; comedian
- Years active: 1999–present
- Spouse: Paula Christensen (m. 2024)
- Children: 1

Michael William Day (born March 20, 1980) is an American actor and comedian. He was hired as a writer for the NBC sketch comedy series Saturday Night Live before its 39th season in 2013. Shortly thereafter, Day joined as an on-air featured player during the show's 42nd season in 2016, later being promoted to repertory status beginning with the 44th season in 2018. He is also the host of the Netflix show Is It Cake? He was formerly an on-air correspondent for The Tonight Show with Jay Leno and The Jay Leno Show.

== Early life and education ==
Michael William Day was born March 20, 1980, in Orange, California. He attended Panorama Elementary School and later graduated from El Modena High School. There, he was involved in the drama program and the student government. He wrote comedic sketches for monthly assemblies and made "Batman" the theme for his homecoming. Day graduated from the University of California, Los Angeles with a degree in theater in 2002.

== Career ==
Day began his career with the Groundlings, a Los Angeles–based improvisational theater group. With the Groundlings, Day and Michael Naughton wrote and co-starred in David Blaine Street Magic, a parody of magician David Blaine, portrayed by Mitch Silpa. The video, posted to YouTube, was once one of the most-viewed videos on the site.

Day was an original cast member on the improvisational comedy series Wild 'n Out on MTV. He played various characters in the Groundling stage show Groundlings, In The Study, With The Candlestick in early 2009 and directed Groundlings Space Camp. Day wrote for Showtime's The Underground in 2006.

Day starred in NBC's Kath & Kim remake (2009), wrote for and co-produced the Cartoon Network show Incredible Crew (2013), and wrote for Adult Swim's Robot Chicken in 2014. Day hosted a recurring segment parodying TMZ from 2010 to 2013 on The Jay Leno Show and The Tonight Show with Jay Leno. Day was a featured cast member of NBC variety show Maya & Marty, alongside Maya Rudolph, Martin Short, and Kenan Thompson. He also served as one of the show's co-head writers.

=== 2013–present: Saturday Night Live ===
Day was hired as a writer for Saturday Night Live in 2013 for its 39th season. He was recommended for the job by Nasim Pedrad, who had worked with him before and was a cast member of SNL at the time, appearing in her fifth and final season on the show. On SNL he wrote many sketches featuring cast member & former Wild 'n Out co-star Taran Killam, with whom he wrote the screenplay to Brother Nature (2016).

He was promoted to featured player for season 42 and was promoted to a repertory player in the beginning of season 44. For his audition, he impersonated Donald Trump Jr. and SNL actor Kyle Mooney. His debut appearance was in season 42's first episode, October 1, 2016, hosted by Margot Robbie. Bobby Moynihan, Streeter Seidell, and Day wrote the sketch "Haunted Elevator" for the October 22, 2016 episode of SNL. Starring Tom Hanks as David S. Pumpkins, Day played one of two dancing skeletons in the sketch. The sketch went viral, and he reprised the role for The David S. Pumpkins Halloween Special (2017). Seidell and Day also co-wrote—with Chase Rosenberg and Simon Rich—the viral sketch "Sister", about the undue burden of home elder care for female family members.

On the April 13, 2024 episode of Saturday Night Live, Day and guest host Ryan Gosling appeared in a sketch as live-action versions of Beavis and Butt-Head. The sketch went viral and received widespread media coverage and critical acclaim. The pair reprised the roles on the red carpet at the premiere of the movie The Fall Guy, in which Gosling played the starring role.

Celebrity impressions on Saturday Night Live

- Steve Bannon (dressed as the Grim Reaper)
- Travis Barker
- David Beckham
- Joe Biden
- Richard Blumenthal
- Butt-Head
- Brendan Carr
- Bruce Castor
- John Cornyn
- Bill Cowher
- Leonardo da Vinci
- Steve Doocy
- Jack Dorsey
- Matt Duffer
- Joseph Dunford
- Rob Dyrdek
- Sean Evans
- Colin Farrell
- Michael Flynn
- Dan Frischman
- Merrick Garland
- Willie Geist
- Jeffrey Goldberg
- Matt Hall
- Prince Harry
- Pee-wee Herman
- Rian Johnson
- Jim Jordan
- Tim Kaine
- Brian Kilmeade
- Steve King
- Greg Lee
- Adam Levine
- Howie Long
- Kevin Love
- Joe Manchin III
- Mitch McConnell
- Stephen Miller
- Roy Moore
- Elon Musk
- John Oliver
- Mehmet Oz
- Pitbull
- Jamie Raskin
- David A. Ricks
- Forrest Gump
- Jim Risch
- Franklin D. Roosevelt
- Paul Ryan
- Bruce Schroeder
- Nate Silver
- Phil Simms
- Steve-O
- Donald Trump Jr.
- Sam Worthington (as Jake Sully from the Avatar film series)
- Volodymyr Zelenskyy

Recurring characters on Saturday Night Live

- Greg Duncan, one half of a couple whose forays into improving their sex life leave Greg seriously and comically injured by his shy, yet intimidating wife Shelley Duncan (Leslie Jones)
- Mort Fellner, a supercentenarian who reports on the achievements and experiences of fellow supercentenarians; however, each report culminates in revealing that the achievement is due to the subject dying.
- Nico Slobkin, one half a shallow couple always on the verge of an argument, who runs a relationship-themed Instagram account with his girlfriend Brie Bacardi (Heidi Gardner).
- Matt Schatt, one half of a couple, who is so disproportionately unexceptional compared to his exceptionally attractive partner that others question how their relationship exists.
- Josh, one of the two unintelligent kids (the other being Lonnie, played by Cecily Strong) in the Science Room sketches.

=== Disney ===
Day and his writing partner Streeter Seidell have completed one project and have two projects in development for Disney. The first of these, Home Sweet Home Alone, the sixth film in the Home Alone franchise, was released on Disney+ on November 12, 2021. A live-action Inspector Gadget film is in pre-production. Walt Disney Pictures is also planning to produce a remake of SpaceCamp.

== Personal life ==
Day dated Selma Blair, whom he met on the set of Kath & Kim, from 2008 to 2010.

Day married his long-term partner, actress Paula Christensen, in 2024. Their son was born in August 2012.

== Filmography ==
=== Film ===
Year	Title	Role	Notes
2007	Katt Williams: American Hustle	Power Agent	
2016	Brother Nature	Thomas Jefferson	Also writer
2019	Brittany Runs a Marathon	Dev	
2019	Little	Connor	
2020	Hubie Halloween	Axehead	
2021	Home Sweet Home Alone	Priest	Also writer
2023	Good Burger 2	Himself	Cameo appearance
2024	Unfrosted	Crackle	

=== Television ===
Year	Title	Role	Notes
1999	The Mike & Ben Show	Various	
1999	The Amanda Show	Ronny	Episode: Episode 5
2001	Cousin Skeeter	Carl	Episode: “Night of the Iguana”
2004	Angel	O'Shea	Episode: "Why We Fight"
2004	Faking the Video	Fake PA	
2004	World Cup Comedy	Himself	
2005–2014, 2018	Wild 'n Out	Himself	Also consulting producer
2005	Reno 911!	School Guy	Episode: "The Prefect of Wanguani"
2006	Totally Awesome	Charlie	TV movie
2006	The Underground	Various	11 episodes; also writer
2007	Nick Cannon Presents: Short Circuitz	Himself	Also consultant writer
2007	Say What? Karaoke 2.0	Himself	
2007	Online Nation	Dave	
2008	Bar Starz	Cole	
2008	Kath & Kim	Craig	17 episodes
2010	Nathan vs. Nurture	Daniel Bennett	TV movie
2010–2013	Mad	Various voices	27 episodes
2011	Friends with Benefits	Derek	Episode: "The Benefit of Forgetting"
2012	Animation Domination High-Def	Professor Oak (voice)	2 episodes; TV mini-series
2013	Incredible Crew	Cosmos Megahead/Fred Johnson/Lifeguard	Also supervising producer, writer
2014–2022	Robot Chicken	Various voices	14 episodes; also writer
2016	Idiotsitter		Episode: "Ex-Boyfriend"
2016	Maya & Marty	Himself/Various	6 episodes; also co-head writer
2016–present	Saturday Night Live	Himself/Various	Also writer
2017	The David S. Pumpkins Halloween Special	Left Skeleton (voice)	TV movie; also writer
2022–present	Is It Cake?	Host	
2025	Abbott Elementary	Craig	Episode: "Team Building"

=== Podcast ===
Year	Title	Role	Notes
2021	Hit Job	Agent Pat	
2024	Stranded	Freddy	
