= David S. Pumpkins =

Fictional character played by Tom Hanks

- Saturday Night Live character
- The character dancing with skeletons in the original sketch
- First appearance: October 22, 2016; Season 42, episode 4
- Last appearance: October 31, 2026; Season 52, episode 4
- Created by: Mikey Day; Bobby Moynihan; Streeter Seidell
- Portrayed by: Tom Hanks
- Voiced by: Tom Hanks

In-universe information
- Full name: David Simon Pumpkins
- Origin: Ibiza

David Simon Pumpkins is a fictional character played by American actor Tom Hanks who first appeared on the October 22, 2016, episode of Saturday Night Live in a sketch written by Mikey Day, Bobby Moynihan, and Streeter Seidell. The character developed a cult following and served as the basis for an animated Halloween special in 2017 and has subsequently returned to SNL multiple times.

== Concept and creation ==
The character was created by Bobby Moynihan, Mikey Day, and Streeter Seidell. Moynihan said they wanted to make a Halloween-themed version of the viral video "Little Superstar" with a character who was a "Santa Claus for Halloween". The writers said the character's middle initial "S" stands for Simon. The writers bought a pumpkin-themed suit for $12.99 at Party City, intending to use something that looked cheap.

The initial idea for the sketch, which did not include the Pumpkins character, involved a "creepy hotel" which resembled Disney's Haunted Mansion, later changed into a Tower of Terror-style ride. Day credits Pumpkins' eventual creation to his love of "stupid suits". The first version of Pumpkins had more dialogue, which Hanks cut back while "playing with the character". There were plans at one point to include Lady Gaga, the episode's musical guest, as "Mrs. David Pumpkins", but she passed on it because "her musical set was pretty involved".

Hanks thought the character was "very bizarre" before the sketch aired and initially suggested Chris Hemsworth would be better suited for the role.

== Appearances ==
=== Saturday Night Live ===
External videos
- Haunted Elevator (ft. David S. Pumpkins), October 22, 2016
- David Pumpkins Returns, October 29, 2022
- Scary Halloween Cold Open (ft. David S. Pumpkins), SNL, October 31, 2026

Pumpkins first appeared in the fourth episode of SNL's 42nd season in a skit later uploaded to YouTube with the title "Haunted Elevator (ft. David S. Pumpkins)". In it, a couple (played by Beck Bennett and Kate McKinnon) enters an attraction named 100 Floors of Frights in which a "Hellevator" operator (Kenan Thompson) opens elevator doors to reveal various characters that scare the couple with traditionally scary scenes. On the 49th floor, the doors open to reveal two dancing skeletons alongside David S. Pumpkins wearing a black and orange pumpkin-themed suit. Instead of being scared, the couple is mystified and asks what Pumpkins is meant to represent and why he is part of the ride. In response, Pumpkins says that he is "his own thing" and that the skeletons (Moynihan and Day) standing next to him on most floors (73 out of 100) of the elevator are "part of it". Pumpkins insists that he is there to "scare the hell out of you", but manages only to confuse the passengers. The elevator visits several other floors, at some of which Pumpkins continues to appear, until the ride stops at the final level. The door opens on just the skeletons, whereupon Pumpkins appears right behind the guests and shout-asks "Any questions?", successfully giving them a fright.

Two episodes later, SNL host Dave Chappelle made a reference to David S. Pumpkins in a sketch titled "Jheri's Place". After the "sketch gone wrong", Chappelle jokingly says that he thought his failed character "was going to be the next David S. Pumpkins".

In the season's finale hosted by Dwayne "the Rock" Johnson, Pumpkins reappears in a prerecorded music video called "Rap Song", using the name David S. Pimpkins and wearing a furry hat and jacket. Alongside other fictional featured artists, Pumpkins pesters the character played by Kenan Thompson, in a pastiche of "overstuffed all-star rap videos" like DJ Khaled's "I'm the One". David S. Pumpkins' parts of the segment are solo; he never appears with any of the other characters in the sketch.

In 2022, Hanks and Moynihan returned in the season 48 episode hosted by Jack Harlow. Viewers began speculating on social media that there was going to be a David S. Pumpkins sketch when Hanks cameoed in an earlier sketch and Moynihan reprised his role as Drunk Uncle on Weekend Update. These suspicions were confirmed when Hanks and Moynihan reprised their roles alongside Day (still a regular cast member) as Pumpkins and the skeletons in one of the final sketches of the night. As in the original sketch, the three repeatedly show up in a jump scare–themed haunted attraction called Cell Block 666 hosted by Thompson, now set in a prison populated by famous horror movie characters, such as Michael Myers and Annabelle (Sarah Sherman). Thompson's operator explains that the ride spent most of its budget on characters like Freddy Krueger (James Austin Johnson) and Pennywise the Clown (Michael Longfellow), so Pumpkins was needed to fill the rest of the attraction. The patrons in this sketch are a group of friends played by Harlow, Ego Nwodim, and Andrew Dismukes. Unlike in the first sketch, Nwodim's character expresses a neutral opinion of Pumpkins, while Harlow outright enjoys him—only Dismukes expresses bewilderment and frustration, particularly at the revelation that Pumpkins is apparently from Ibiza. Once again, Pumpkins delivers on his promise to "scare [the group] stupid" by surprising them at the end of the sketch.

On October 31, 2026, Hanks and Moynihan returned in season 52 (episode 4, hosted by Inde Navarrette) for the Halloween-themed cold opening. The sketch began with a couple (played by Grace Reiter and Jeremy Culhane) on a haunted ride, and Thompson returning as the "Hellevator" operator. Once David S. Pumpkins and the skeletons (Day and Moynihan) successfully confused the couple, President Donald Trump (played by James Austin Johnson) interrupted the sketch. Johnson, as Trump, mocked the audience about not getting a full David S. Pumpkins sketch this year, made jokes about recent election news, the Epstein files, and avid supporters of Trump, including Nicki Minaj (played by Saidah Belo-Osagie) and former White House Press Secretary Katie Zacharia (played by Veronika Slowikowska). In reference to Zacharia's October 13 press briefing, Slowikowska, as Zacharia, botched the signature "Live from New York, it's Saturday Night!". Johnson, as Trump, directed her off stage, and gestured to Hanks, Day, and Moynihan to break character and deliver the signature line.

=== The Halloween Special ===
On September 28, 2017, NBC announced that Pumpkins would star in a 30-minute animated special to be produced by Bento Box Animation. Hanks, Day and Moynihan reprised their roles, with Seidell and Peter Dinklage joining the cast. Two weeks prior to the announcement, Hanks posted a picture of the special's script, titled "The David S. Pumpkins Song", on social media.

The David S. Pumpkins Halloween Special aired October 28, 2017. It starts with a live-action address from Hanks dressed as Pumpkins. In the story, Kevin (whose adult self, voiced by Dinklage, is telling the story) is embarrassed to take his younger sister trick-or-treating. After choosing the "magic pumpkin" at a pumpkin patch, David S. Pumpkins and the skeletons take them on an adventure and sing-along. The siblings ride in Pumpkins' "pumpkinmobile" (a strawberry car) while the mysterious villain named the Raincoat Man is stealing all the Halloween candy. Pumpkins and the skeletons rescue the candy from what turns out to be pre-teens who had bullied Kevin. Pumpkins uses magic to deliver the candy around the neighborhood inside of pumpkins.

== Reception ==
When the character was first performed, his appeal was unclear to some but he immediately developed a fan following. Airing just weeks before the 2016 U.S. presidential election, it has been suggested that the non-political nature of the sketch helped fuel its popularity. Day suggested this came from a "weird alchemy of Halloween, the best host ever, the time of the country, and just a silly song". Seidell said, "The election was so intense. David Pumpkins, this dumb silly thing, was the last thing that everyone could kind of agree on, that they could talk to each other about without it ruining Thanksgiving".

Hanks's performance as an SNL host, including the Pumpkins sketch, earned him a nomination for the Primetime Emmy Award for Outstanding Guest Actor in a Comedy Series in 2017.

The character's apparent meaninglessness was referenced in the original skit. Tom Hanks jokingly tweeted that he dressed as Pumpkins for Halloween in 2016. In promotion for a Reddit AMA, Microsoft founder Bill Gates parodied the original sketch, and received some criticism for the effort. In October 2017, Madame Tussauds Orlando adapted their existing wax figure of Tom Hanks to appear as David Pumpkins.
