= Bobby Moynihan =

American comedian and actor (born 1977)

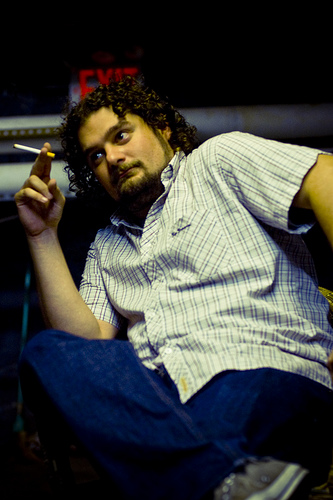
- Moynihan in 2007
- Born: January 31, 1977 (age 49); Eastchester, New York, U.S.
- Education: University of Connecticut (BFA)
- Occupations: Comedian; actor; writer; producer
- Years active: 1996–present
- Notable work: Derrick Comedy; Saturday Night Live
- Spouse: Brynn O'Malley (m. 2016)
- Children: 2

Robert Michael Moynihan Jr. (born January 31, 1977) is an American comedian and actor. He was a cast member and writer for the sketch comedy series Saturday Night Live from 2008 to 2017.

Outside of SNL, he has also voiced Louie Duck on Disney's DuckTales from 2017 to 2021, Panda on Cartoon Network's We Bare Bears from 2015 to 2020, and Hal the Dog in the PBS Kids series Nature Cat from 2015 to 2025. He has also voiced roles in Monsters University (2013), The Secret Life of Pets (2016) and The Secret Life of Pets 2 (2019), Fixed (2025), Hoppers and Minions & Monsters (both 2026). He portrayed Jayden Kwapis on the sitcom Mr. Mayor and the manatee Loafy in the 2020 show of the same name of which he is also the creator, executive producer, director and writer. He also portrayed Cal Hampton in the video game Grand Theft Auto VI (2026).

== Early life and education ==
Moynihan was born and raised in Eastchester, New York. He graduated from Eastchester High School in 1995 and from the University of Connecticut's School of Fine Arts in 1999. After graduation, Moynihan toured with a Shakespeare company before discovering Upright Citizens Brigade, where Amy Poehler gave him a job as a bartender for free classes. One of his first classes was with then-15-year-old Zach Woods.

== Career ==
Moynihan frequently performed with the Derrick Comedy sketch group and appeared in many of their popular internet videos and various projects. He also filmed a supporting role in the group's feature film Mystery Team, which premiered at the Sundance Film Festival in 2009 before a limited theatrical release.

In mid-2008, Moynihan had a supporting role in the popular web-series The Line, an online video project funded by Lorne Michaels' production company, directed by SNL head writer and cast member Seth Meyers, and starring SNL cast members Bill Hader and Jason Sudeikis. He acted as a sketch regular on Late Night with Conan O'Brien for a number of years and was a contributing writer on MTV's Human Giant, and in years past, he often submitted scripts to SNL with comedy partner Charlie Sanders. Moynihan has also acted in a number of comedy shorts for the website CollegeHumor, including their webseries Every Week on Entourage where he plays "Turtle" from Entourage. During the summer of 2008, Moynihan featured in a national television ad campaign for ESPN Radio with Yankees broadcaster Michael Kay. In the summer of 2009, Moynihan starred in the music video for Colbie Caillat's single, "Fallin' for You". He also appeared in three of The Lonely Island's music videos; "Boombox", "Shy Ronnie 2" and "Threw It On The Ground". He made a guest appearance as the drug-addicted Conrad Bellingham on Mercy. He also appeared in the films The Invention of Lying, When in Rome, and Certainty. In 2013, he made his voice acting film debut in Monsters University as Chet Alexander, a member of the Roar Omega Roar fraternity. Moynihan also voiced the titular character in the FX animated comedy Chozen, which aired for one season in 2014.

In 2015, he was a featured character, Lenny, in the romantic comedy film Slow Learners (original title Bad Boys, Crazy Girls). He also voiced Panda in the Cartoon Network series We Bare Bears, as well as Hal the Dog in the PBS Kids animated series Nature Cat. In 2016, Moynihan appeared in a commercial for Pizza Hut's Bacon Stuffed crust pizza, and voiced Mel from The Secret Life of Pets in the same year. After SNL, he was the lead in the short-lived CBS sitcom Me, Myself & I. From 2017 to 2021, he voiced the character Louie Duck in the Disney Channel/Disney XD revival of DuckTales. In June 2023, he started voicing the character Bobby Boots in the Disney Junior TV series Pupstruction.

From 2021 to 2022, Moynihan played interim Director of Communications Jayden Kwapis in the NBC sitcom Mr. Mayor, and stars as the titular manatee in his series Loafy. In December 2021, Moynihan wrote the segment "The Holiday Pact" in DC Comics' anthology special Tis the Season to Be Freezin', starring the Flash and Captain Cold. Moynihan released a children's book titled Not All Sheep Are Boring, with illustrations by Julie Rowan-Zoch and published by Penguin Random House, in 2022.

In March 2025, Moynihan appeared on Season 2 of Dropout’s interview-parody show Very Important People in the episode "Dan Wesley Sharron", playing a frozen man with the same name.

In 2025, he was nominated for a Children's & Family Emmy for Outstanding Voice Performer in a Preschool Program.

=== Saturday Night Live ===
Moynihan joined the cast of NBC's Saturday Night Live during season 34 on September 13, 2008, and remained through the end of season 42 on May 20, 2017. He has made subsequent cameo appearances during Jack Harlow's hosting debut in 2022 and the Saturday Night Live 50th Anniversary Special.

==== Recurring characters on SNL ====
- Mark Payne is a waiter at Pizzeria Uno. He wears a T-shirt featuring Sagara Sanosuke from Rurouni Kenshin and always complains about inconsequential things around the pizzeria.
- Dancing skeleton in the Haunted Elevator sketch featuring Tom Hanks as David S. Pumpkins. Moynihan co-wrote the sketch and an animated special that aired on NBC the following year.
- Anthony Crispino is an incompetent reporter at Weekend Update.
- Vinny Vedecci Jr. is the son of Italian talk show host Vinny Vedecci. He wants to ask celebrities ridiculous questions, but they cannot understand his broken English, which makes him cry. Vinny Jr. is based on Johnny Caspar Jr., a character in Miller's Crossing.
- Liam is one of the kids in Gilly's elementary school class. It is often implied that he hates his stepfather.
- Obnoxious Microphone Guy is an annoying man who attends parties and other events and steals the microphone from the emcee.
- Scared Straight Kid, one of the three young trouble-makers (along with Bill Hader and Andy Samberg) lectured by convict Lorenzo McIntosh (played by Kenan Thompson) and McIntosh's fellow inmates including hosts Taylor Swift, Lindsay Lohan, and Betty White. McIntosh usually throws his shoe out of anger, and in later sketches he gives it to him to throw.
- Ass Dan, a member of the Kick Spit Underground Rock Festival and winner of the Worst He-Man Impression Contest and the Mud-Eating Contest. Even though the Blake Lively/Rihanna episode established that he died in 2009 at the age of 28 (Ass Dan was born in 1981), he was brought back as one half of the Thrilla Killa Klownz on the episode hosted by Ryan Phillippe in the music video "Magical Mysteries" (in which it was stated that Ass Dan "did just die" in the 2010 sketch, making Ass Dan 29 at the time), brought back again for the 2010 Crunkmas Carnival sketch (in which Li'l Blaster established that Ass Dan was dead and finally getting the wake he deserves), and brought back again for the 2011 Easter Festival (in which D.J. Supersoak established that Ass Dan was getting a proper burial), making Ass Dan 30 years old at the time of this death. The 2011 Columbus Day Assblast on the episode hosted by Ben Stiller implied that Ass Dan was still alive, though he almost had a heart attack and still died before he could say that he was going to live forever after the heart attack allegedly passed. On the Bruno Mars episode in October 2012, it's revealed that Ass Dan has an identical twin brother named Butt Dave (also played by Bobby Moynihan).
- Keith, a young movie fan who is excited about everything except for the illustrious actor/host that week, notably snubbing Robert De Niro in favor of Ben Stiller on the set of Little Fockers. In Keith's first appearance, he snubbed a hockey player (played by host Bradley Cooper).
- Doug, the mechanic for the Merryville Brothers trolley ride. His character was not named on the first sketch with Jim Carrey as the third Merryville brother.
- Richie, the stage manager from The Best of Both Worlds who has, on two occasions, been murdered by Julie Andrews and Ice Cube (played by Helen Mirren and Kenan Thompson respectively) and by Daniel Radcliffe and Clint Eastwood (also played respectively by Hugh Jackman and Bill Hader).
- Slappy Pappy, one of the regular comedians in the "Original Kings of Catchphrase Comedy" video series.
- Drunk Uncle, an extremely inebriated and bitter character who drunkenly rants and raves during Weekend Update.
- Janet Peckinpaugh, a middle-aged woman who hooks up with male celebrities, she hooked up with Tom Brady (as played by Channing Tatum) and Adam Levine as himself.
- Niff, a retail worker who, along with Dana (Cecily Strong) always insults retail workers whenever they fear they're going to get fired.
- Kirby, an astronaut obsessed with his "little kitty cat".
- Riblet, Michael Che's high school friend on Weekend Update.

==== Celebrity impressions ====
- Bill Belichick
- Ken Bone
- Susan Boyle
- Chris Christie
- Mindy Cohn
- David Crosby
- Ted Cruz
- John Daly
- Danny DeVito
- Josh Duggar
- Guy Fieri
- Jared Fogle
- Rob Ford
- Barney Frank
- James Gandolfini (as Tony Soprano)
- Jeff Garlin
- Newt Gingrich
- Jonah Hill
- Mike Huckabee
- Kim Jong-un
- Rob Kardashian
- Brian Kilmeade
- Nathan Lane
- George Lucas
- George R. R. Martin
- Rosie O'Donnell
- Psy
- Seth Rogen
- Kevin Smith
- Snooki
- Steven Seagal
- Donald Sterling
- Glenn Thrush
- Andrea Bocelli

== Personal life ==
In August 2016, Moynihan married his longtime partner, Broadway actress Brynn O'Malley. Their daughter was born in July 2017. The family lives in Los Angeles.

== Filmography ==
=== Film ===
Year	Title	Role	Notes
1999	Nine the Hard Way	Stretch	
2002	Economics 101	C.D.	
2009	Charlie on Parole	Ex-Con	Short
2009	Mystery Team	Jordy	
2009	The Invention of Lying	Assistant	
2010	When in Rome	Puck	
2011	Certainty	Roddy	
2012	The Brass Teapot	Chuck	
2012	Revenge for Jolly!	Bobby	
2013	Monsters University	Chet Alexander (voice)	
2013	Grown Ups 2	Male Cheerleader	Cameo
2013	Delivery Man	Aleksy	
2014	Party Central	Chet Alexander (voice)	Short film
2014	Adult Beginners	Paul	
2014	Bread and Butter	Daniel Lodgen	
2014	Annie	Guy in Bar	
2015	Slow Learners	Lenny	
2015	Inside Out	Forgetter Bobby (voice)	Cameo
2015	Ted 2	Himself	Cameo
2015	Staten Island Summer	Skootch	
2015	Underdogs	Rip (voice)	
2015	Sisters	Alex	
2016	The Secret Life of Pets	Mel (voice)	
2016	Brother Nature	Todd Dotchman	
2017	The Book of Henry	John	
2017	The Nut Job 2: Nutty by Nature	Mayor Percival J. Muldoon (voice)	
2017	Killing Gunther	Donnie	
2019	The Secret Life of Pets 2	Mel (voice)	
2019	Super Gidget	Mel (voice)	Cameo; Short
2020	We Bare Bears: The Movie	Panda (voice)	
2021	Flora & Ulysses	Stanlee	
2021	America: The Motion Picture	Paul Revere (voice)	
2022	Clerks III	Auditioner 19	
2024	Unfrosted	Chef Boy Ardee	
2024	IF	Jeremy	
2024	Inside Out 2	Forgetter Bobby (voice)	
2025	You're Cordially Invited	Himself	
2025	Fixed	Lucky (voice)	
2026	Hoppers	King George (voice)	
2026	Pizza Movie	Snackatron 3000 (voice)	
2026	Minions & Monsters	Phillips (voice)	

=== Television ===
Year	Title	Role	Notes
1996	Homicide: Life on the Street	Doorman	1 episode (uncredited)
2004	Jump Cuts	The Beef	1 episode
2005	Empire Square	Rabbit (voice)	(US version)
2006–2008	Late Night with Conan O'Brien	Various	
2007–2008	Bronx World Travelers	Glider	3 episodes
2007–2011	UCB Comedy Originals	—N/a	4 episodes Also director, writer and editor
2008–2017	Saturday Night Live	Various	Main cast
2008–2012	Saturday Night Live Weekend Update Thursday	Various	4 episodes
2008	Human Giant	—N/a	Writer; 1 episode
2009	The Electric Company	Skeleckian Gravity Spray Spokesperson	Episode: "Gravity Groove"
2009	Chowder	Jam (voice)	Episode: "The Grape Worm"
2009	Mercy	Conrad Bellingham	Episode: "I Believe You Conrad"
2011	UBC Comedy Originals	—N/a	Writer; 4 episodes
2012	Happy Endings	Corey	Episode: "You Snooze, You Bruise"
2012	Ugly Americans	Jerry "The Fire Ant" McMillan (voice)	Episode: "Journey to the Center of Twayne"
2012	30 Rock	Stewart Derr	Episode: "Murphy Brown Lied to Us"
2012	Girls	Thadd	Episode: "She Did"
2012	Portlandia	Robert	Episode: "Winter in Portlandia"
2012–2013	The Side Car	Brick (voice)	7 episodes Also writer
2013	Sesame Street	Quacker Duck Man	Episode: "Porridge Art"
2013	Aqua Teen Hunger Force	Zarfonius (voice)	Episode: "Storage Zeebles"
2013–2015	The Awesomes	Various voices	26 episodes
2013–2016	Comedy Bang! Bang!	Fourvel	4 episodes
2014	Chozen	Chozen (voice)	10 episodes
2014	Playing House	Danny	Episode: "Spaghetti and Meatballs"
2014–2016	Jake and the Never Land Pirates	King Crab (voice)	3 episodes
2014–2019	Drunk History	Various	2 episodes
2015	The Jack and Triumph Show	Mr. Hardgraves	Episode: "Siri"
2015	The Simpsons	Tyler Boom (voice)	Episode: "Cue Detective"
2015–2019	We Bare Bears	Panda (voice)	105 episodes
2015–2025	Nature Cat	Hal (voice)	98 episodes
2016	Netflix Presents: The Characters	Chuck	Episode: "Lauren Lapkus"
2016	Albert	Albert (voice)	Television film
2017	Man Seeking Woman	Puffala (voice)	Episode: "Popcorn"
2017	Descendants 2	Dude (voice)	Television film
2017	Big Brother	Himself	Episode #19.34
2017	The David S. Pumpkins Halloween Special	Fat Skeleton (voice)	TV special Also writer and producer
2017–2021	DuckTales	Louie Duck, additional voices	Main cast
2017–2018	Me, Myself & I	Alex Riley	Main cast; 13 episodes
2017–2023	RuPaul's Drag Race	Himself/Guest Judge	3 episodes (including "Good God Girl, Get Out")
2018	Bob's Burgers	Sam (voice)	Episode: "Are You There Bob? It's Me, Birthday"
2018	Detroiters	Himself (As "Fat Bieber")	Episode: "Lois"
2018–2019	Unbreakable Kimmy Schmidt	Fran Dodd	3 episodes
2018–2023	Summer Camp Island	Mortimer, Melvin, Jimjams, Toad Doctor, Additional Voices (voice)	44 episodes
2018–2020	Star Wars Resistance	Orka, additional voices	Main cast
2018, 2025	Last Week Tonight with John Oliver	Santa Claus, Joe Bailey	2 episodes
2019	Documentary Now!	Larry Hawburger	Episode: "Any Given Saturday Afternoon"
2019	Descendants 3	Dude (voice)	Television film
2019	Where's Waldo?	Wizard Wavybeard (voice)	Episode: "Hang Ten in Tahiti"
2019	Vampirina	Blizzy Stormfront (voice)	Episode: "Freeze Our Guest"
2019–2025	The Bravest Knight	Grunt (voice)	26 episodes
2019–2022	Crank Yankers	Various voices	4 episodes
2020	Harvey Girls Forever!	Casper (voice)	Episode: "Scare Bud"
2020	Tacoma FD	Jumper Jim	Episode: "The Crying Game"
2020	Game On!	Himself (contestant)	Episode: "Celebrity Guests: Tony Hale and Bobby Moynihan"
2020	Loafy	Loafy (voice)	Main role; also creator and executive producer
2020–2021	It's Pony	Brian (voice)	12 episodes
2021–2022	Mr. Mayor	Jayden Kwapis	Main role
2021–2022	Kid Cosmic	Fantos the Amassor (voice)	7 episodes
2021	Star Wars: The Bad Batch	Citizen #2, Trader (voice)	Episode: "Cornered"
2021	Miracle Workers	Governor Lane	2 episodes
2021	Star Wars: Visions	Geezer (voice)	Short film: Tatooine Rhapsody: English Language dub
2021	Dogs in Space	Gooey (voice)	Episode: "Who's a Good Boy"
2022	Is It Cake?	Judge	Netflix
2022	Star Trek: Lower Decks	Chief Carlton Dennis/Gavin (voice)	Episode: "Grounded"
2022	Battle Kitty	Alley Kitty (voice)	Episode: "Cashino Woods"
2022	Blockbuster	Lil' Stevie	Episode: "Sh*t Storm"
2022–2023	Alice's Wonderland Bakery	Tweedle Don't (voice)	5 episodes
2023	Party Down	Mattea	Episode: "KSGY-95 Prizewinner's Luau"
2023	RuPaul's Drag Race All Stars	Himself	Episode: "It's RDR Live!"
2023–2024	Krapopolis	Barbarian, Ranger, Jaxton (voice)	2 episodes
2023–2026	Pupstruction	Bobby Boots (voice)	
2024	Impractical Jokers	Himself	Episode: "Bobby Moynihan"
2024	Monsters at Work	Chet Alexander (voice)	6 episodes
2024	Hamster & Gretel	Slamonade Stan (voice)	Episode: "I Think Therefore I Slam"
2024	Dinner Time Live with David Chang	Himself	Episode: "Thanksgiving in 45 Minutes"
2024–2025	Lego Star Wars: Rebuild the Galaxy	Jedi Bob (voice)	Main role
2024–present	NCIS: Origins	Woodrow "Woody" Browne	Recurring role
2025	Very Important People	Dan Wesley Sharron	Episode: "Dan Wesley Sharron"
2025	The Second Best Hospital in the Galaxy	(voice)	Episode: "Should We Buy a Spaceship That's Also a Can Opener?"
2025	Big Brother: Unlocked	Guest	Companion show with Big Brother 27
2025	Haunted Hotel	Jeremy Laramie (voice)	Episode: "How to Train Your Demon"
2025	Bat-Fam	Man-Bat (voice)	Main role
2025	NCIS	Woodrow "Woody" Browne	Episode: "Now and Then"
2026	The Fall and Rise of Reggie Dinkins	Rusty Boyd	Main role
2026	Invincible	Edward Thompson (voice)	2 episodes
2026	Adventure Time: Side Quests	Goblin Manager, Joey Waffles, Party Goblin (voice)	2 episodes
2026	Hungy Ghost	Hungy Ghost, Jerry, Mother Rabbit (voice)	Main role

=== Video games ===
Year	Title	Role	Notes
2026	Grand Theft Auto VI	Cal Hampton	Voice, motion capture and likeness

=== Music videos ===
Year	Title	Artist	Role
2009	"Fallin' for You"	Colbie Caillat	Love interest
2011	"Threw It On The Ground"	The Lonely Island	EnergyZap Spokesman

=== Podcasts ===
Year	Title	Episode	Role	Notes
2018	Mission To Zyxx	211: Shmorby and the Beast	Shmorby (voice)	1 episode
