= Luke Null =

American actor and comedian (born 1990)

- Born: Lucas Elliot Null; July 7, 1990 (age 35); Cincinnati, Ohio, U.S.
- Occupations: Actor; comedian
- Years active: 2011–present
- Known for: Saturday Night Live
- Spouse: Kaitlin Cady Shultz (m. 2019)

Lucas Elliot Null (born July 7, 1990) is an American actor and comedian. He is best known as a cast member on the NBC sketch comedy series Saturday Night Live for its 43rd season (2017–18).

He got his start in comedy in Chicago.

After leaving SNL, he began work on an album to be distributed through the comedy label 800 Pound Gorilla. It is titled Guitar Comic and was released in June 2019. He has since released a comedy video special with 800 Pound Gorilla titled Pretty Songs, Dirty Words in March 2025.
