= Saturday Night Live parodies of Donald Trump =

Television comedy series

Taran Killam (left) and Darrell Hammond (right) played Donald Trump when the real Trump (middle) hosted (November 7, 2015)

The sketch comedy television series Saturday Night Live (SNL) has parodied Donald Trump since 1988, covering his time as a real estate broker to his popular run as host of The Apprentice, and during and between his presidencies.

Trump has been portrayed on SNL by performers including Phil Hartman, Darrell Hammond, Jason Sudeikis, Taran Killam, Alec Baldwin and James Austin Johnson. Hammond portrayed him the longest while in the cast in the late 1990s, and then reprising the role in a series of cameos in 2016. The other cast-members held the role briefly, with five appearances by Hartman, three by Killam, and only one by Sudeikis. The role was played by Baldwin in 46 recurring guest appearances along with one hosting appearance between October 2016 and November 2020, just ahead of the 2016 presidential election, and throughout the first Trump presidency. As of October 2026, Trump is portrayed by Johnson, who took on the role in November 2021.

SNL has frequently paired parodies of Trump with impressions of his wives and children or, since he took office, various staff-members. Trump himself has hosted the show twice, in 2004 and 2015, the latter time as a presidential candidate.

== Phil Hartman (1988–1990) ==
Cast member Phil Hartman was the show's first portrayer of Donald Trump, from 1988 until 1990. Hartman portrayed Trump five times, and was paired with Jan Hooks as Trump's then-wife Ivana Trump or, in one case, Marla Maples, Trump's second-wife-to-be.

The first sketch, from December 1988, shows Donald and Ivana celebrating Christmas, giving large, gold and jewel-encrusted presents to each other, in a parody of the O. Henry short story, "The Gift of the Magi".

The real Trump is seen in the audience at the Saturday Night Live 15th Anniversary Special from 1989, where Chevy Chase spills popcorn on him.

A sketch from February 1990 parodies the Ivana Trump divorce. Ivana demands more money since Donald has been unfaithful, but he refutes this by referring to their extensive prenuptial agreement. It states, among other things, that he is entitled to have mistresses provided they are younger than she is, and that she will be paid in giant stone coins.

The next episode had Marla Maples and Trump appearing on Church Chat. The couple are referred to as a "Satanic sandwich", and the sketch shows press coverage of their relationship, including a "Best Sex I've Ever Had" headline.

== Darrell Hammond (1999–2011, 2015–2016) ==
Hartman did not appear in Trump-sketches after 1990, and Darrell Hammond's first two portrayals came in 1999. The first sketch had Ross Perot (Cheri Oteri) searching for "a new crazy leader" for the Reform Party, with Trump and Pat Buchanan (Chris Parnell) as possible candidates. Their meeting is crashed by a violent Jesse Ventura (Will Ferrell). In the second sketch, Trump announces that he is running for president and tells the audience, "Eh, don't try to fight it. Alright?" He also introduces his running mate, Who Wants to Be a Millionaire? winner John Carpenter.

Hammond resumed playing Trump in 2004, doing so a total of 16 times up to 2011, although he left the cast in 2009. His parodies focused on Trump's interest and involvement with politics, commercials, and his appearances on The Apprentice. Trump hosted the show in April 2004, praising Hammond in his opening monologue and appeared in a sketch next to Hammond's Trump.

An early 2005 episode introduced Trump's third wife, Melania (Paris Hilton). Trump brings her home to let his children, Eric Trump (Fred Armisen), Donald Trump Jr. (Seth Meyers), and Ivanka Trump (Maya Rudolph), "meet their new mommy". Melania would be portrayed later by Molly Shannon and, from 2015 and onward (without Hammond), by Cecily Strong.

Hammond is the show's longest-running Trump impersonator. He played the role for ten years in the cast, 1999 to 2009, and reprised it twice in 2011. In the 2011 sketches, Trump involves himself in the upcoming Republican Party presidential primaries and questions President Obama's birth certificate.

After returning to serve as the show's announcer in 2014, he began reprising his role as Trump regularly, beginning in December 2015. Due to the wide field of GOP candidates in the 2016 U.S. presidential election, the show needed at least one cameo appearance to cover all of the candidates. Taran Killam, who at this point had begun playing Trump, switched to portraying Ted Cruz. SNL had asked alumnus Jimmy Fallon (who had portrayed Trump on his own show) to play the part. When a last minute change prevented this, Hammond returned to the role. Cecily Strong, who had portrayed Melania opposite Killam's Trump, continued in this role alongside Hammond.

Hammond subsequently appeared as Trump in seven more episodes of the season. His appearance in the role was critically acclaimed, but some outlets reported that the role should be moved to a permanent cast member at some point.

== Jason Sudeikis (2012) ==
Jason Sudeikis appeared in the role once, during a Fox & Friends parody. Sudeikis' Trump comments on Barack Obama's handling of Hurricane Sandy.

== Taran Killam (2015) ==
It was announced prior to the show's forty-first season that Taran Killam would be taking over the role for the 2016 U.S. presidential election. Reportedly, several cast members had auditioned for the role.

Killam's Trump debuted on the October 2015 sketch "A Message From Donald & Melania Trump", which also introduced Cecily Strong as Melania Trump. The message is sent from "our humble gold house", and Donald presents himself as "the man who's almost certainly your next president". The couple praise Donald's qualities as a person and a politician, although he becomes uncomfortable when she claims that he "was Democrat before he was Republican". The duo reprised the setup and characters in December, wishing viewers a Merry Christmas and presenting a "Naughty and Nice" list. Donald placed Santa on the "naughty" list since he does not trust anybody who can fly over a wall.

Donald Trump hosted SNL a second time in November 2015, and Killam and Hammond appeared during the opening monologue alongside him. Since Trump was running for president, his appearance triggered the equal-time rule, so his opponents received free air time on NBC affiliate stations. Trump appeared in a sketch portraying him as an incredibly successful president in 2018. Cecily Strong parodied Melania, and Trump's daughter Ivanka appeared in a cameo. Trump ends the sketch by telling the audience that his actual presidency would be even better. Trump is one of 17 presidential candidates who have appeared on Saturday Night Live, and the only American president to have hosted the show. Killam later expressed regret and shame for what he referred to as "normalizing" Trump's candidacy.

For the December 19, 2015 episode, SNL lacked enough cast members to portray all of the GOP candidates in a debate sketch. As a result, Jimmy Fallon was asked to return in the role of Trump (which he had played many times on The Tonight Show) so that Killam could portray Ted Cruz instead. Ultimately, that plan fell through at the last minute, and instead, Hammond played Trump in the debate.

Hammond continued to play Trump for the remainder of the season. Killam's contract was terminated early after that season, with some news sources alleging that being replaced as Trump was part of the reason.

== Alec Baldwin (2016–2020) ==
In September 2016, SNL announced that Alec Baldwin would replace Hammond in portraying Trump in its parodies of the 2016 presidential debates. Hammond had not expected this, and was very shaken by the replacement. Baldwin continued portraying Trump through 2020. Unlike his predecessors, he has never been a cast-member, but as of February 2017 he has hosted the show 17 times, more than anyone else. Baldwin received a Critics' Choice Award and a Primetime Emmy Award for his portrayal of Trump.

=== Before the 2016 election ===
Baldwin's Trump debuted in the October 1, 2016 episode, opposite Kate McKinnon as Hillary Clinton and Michael Che as debate moderator Lester Holt. The sketch was based on the first presidential debate between Clinton and Trump. The episode also included impressions of members of Trump's family in a parody of the game show Family Feud.

Further sketches with Baldwin included elements of the other presidential debates, the vice presidential debate, and the Access Hollywood tape.

The October 15 episode featured a parody of the third presidential debate. Later in the episode, Baldwin and Cecily Strong appeared as Donald and Melania Trump, in a parody of Beyoncé's album Lemonade. Host Emily Blunt portrayed Ivanka Trump, and Vanessa Bayer appeared as Trump's youngest daughter Tiffany Trump.

Trump reacted negatively to this episode on Twitter, saying that Baldwin's portrayal "stinks" and that it was "time to retire the boring and unfunny show."

=== After the 2016 election ===
Post-election sketches have included Baldwin's Trump meeting with people such as the Chairman of the Joint Chiefs of Staff, Mitt Romney (Jason Sudeikis), and Vladimir Putin (Beck Bennett), with humor drawn from the 2016 United States election interference by Russia. In February 2017, it was reported that the show has had strong viewer ratings since the election.

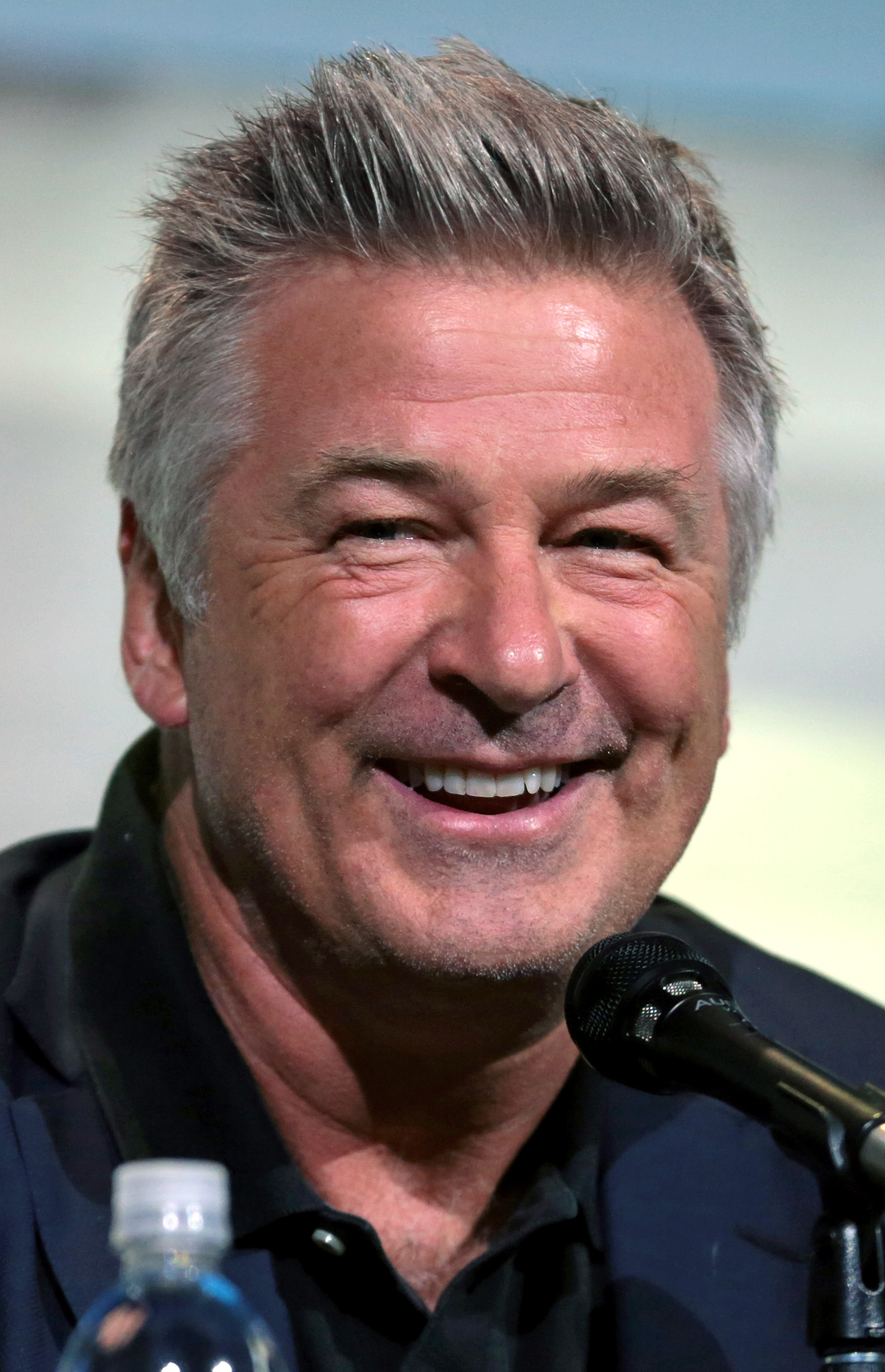
Baldwin in 2016, the year he began portraying Trump on SNL

Several people who work closely with Trump have been frequently parodied. These include White House Chief Strategist Steve Bannon (Mikey Day) with a Grim Reaper-like appearance, White House Press Secretaries Sean Spicer (Melissa McCarthy), and Sarah Huckabee Sanders (Aidy Bryant), and United States Attorney General Jeff Sessions (Kate McKinnon). Senior counselor Kellyanne Conway was frequently parodied by the show. Vice President Mike Pence was portrayed by Beck Bennett, and Trump's sons Eric and Donald Jr. by Alex Moffat and Mikey Day respectively. Elder daughter Ivanka Trump was also featured, as portrayed by Scarlett Johansson, though she has also been portrayed by Margot Robbie. Other parodies of people associated with the Trump Administration post-election included Jared Kushner (Jimmy Fallon), an unmasked Steve Bannon (Bill Murray), Michael Cohen (Ben Stiller), Brett Kavanaugh (Matt Damon), Robert Mueller (Robert de Niro), Rudy Giuliani (Kate McKinnon), Paul Manafort (Alex Moffat), and Mitch McConnell (Beck Bennett).

Trump tweeted his displeasure with the show in November, December, and January, saying "Totally biased, not funny and the Baldwin impersonation just can't get any worse." and "NBCNews is bad but Saturday Night Live is the worst of NBC. Not funny, cast is terrible, always a complete hit job. Really bad television!".

El Nacional, a Dominican newspaper, mistakenly published Baldwin's picture instead of Trump's in February 2017. The paper quickly apologized.

In June 2021, after Trump had left office, it was reported that while Trump was in office he had inquired if the Federal Communications Commission or the United States Justice Department could force SNL to stop portraying him. Trump denied that he has ever made such an inquiry, but claimed that his portrayal by SNL "should be considered an illegal campaign contribution from the Democrat Party." He also criticized Baldwin's portrayal of him, but praised Darrell Hammond's portrayal.

Baldwin portrayed Trump only once after the 2020 United States presidential election, declaring in a November 2020 appearance that he (in character as Trump) had won the election. Immediately after that last portrayal, Baldwin tweeted "I don’t believe I’ve ever been this overjoyed to lose a job before!"

== James Austin Johnson (2021–present) ==
SNL cast member James Austin Johnson began portraying Trump in November 2021, season 47. His portrayal received positive reviews. Megan Garber of The Atlantic called his portrayal of Trump "deeply skillful" and Tara Palmeri of Politico said it was "an uncanny likeness – better than any Trump impression we’ve seen – that captures not only his mannerisms and vocal tics, but his jigsaw-like thought pattern as he speaks".

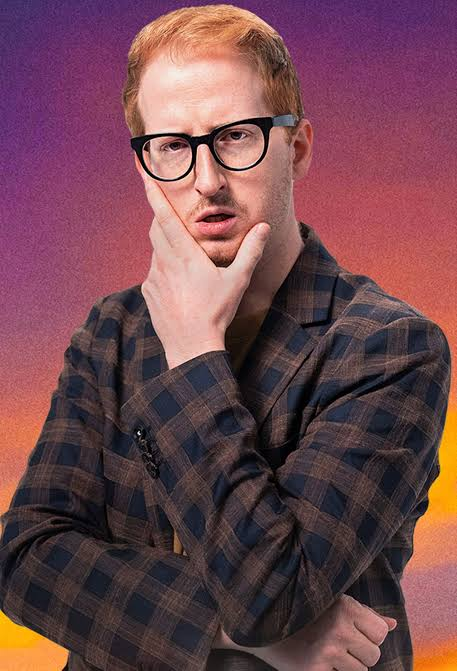
James Austin Johnson has portrayed Trump on SNL since 2021

Johnson has noted that Trump has been in the public spotlight a long time, and that Trump's voice has changed noticeably over the years, which affects Johnson's contemporary impression of him. SNL alumnus Seth Meyers described the impression as stream of consciousness. Shane Gillis portrayed Trump in the skit "Trump Sneakers," with a supporting appearance by Johnson.
