= Shenker =

Shenker (also Shenkar or Schanker) is a surname. It is of Ashkenazi origin and is an occupational surname referring to tavern-keepers. It is derived from the Yiddish word shenk, meaning to serve a drink. Notable people with the surname include:

- Anat Shenker-Osorio (born 1978), American political strategist
- Arie Shenkar (1877–1959), Israeli industrialist
- Ben Zion Shenker (1925–2016), American composer and cantor
- Israel Shenker (1925–2007), scholar and reporter for The New York Times
- John Samuel Shenker (born 1998), American football player
- Joseph Shenker (1939–2008), American academic administrator
- Louis Schanker (1903–1981), American abstract artist
- Morris Shenker (1907–1989), American lawyer
- Orly Shenker (born 1960), Israeli philosopher
- Scott Shenker (born 1956), American computer scientist
- Stephen Shenker (born 1953), American theoretical physicist

== See also ==
- Judge Shenker, fictional character
