= Saturday Night Live parodies of Kellyanne Conway =

The sketch comedy television show Saturday Night Live (SNL) parodied Kellyanne Conway, the former campaign manager and senior counselor to Donald Trump, in a recurring series of sketches beginning in October 2016. Conway was portrayed exclusively by cast member Kate McKinnon across all of her SNL appearances. The sketches were notable for their use of film parody formats, including spoofs of Chicago, Fatal Attraction, and It.

McKinnon initially portrayed Conway as a self-aware political operative who defended Trump for personal reasons rather than ideological conviction. This characterization was criticized by some as inaccurate, and McKinnon's Conway sharpened over the course of the sketches. McKinnon's Conway appearances contributed to her Emmy Award win for Outstanding Supporting Actress in a Comedy Series in 2017.

== Background ==
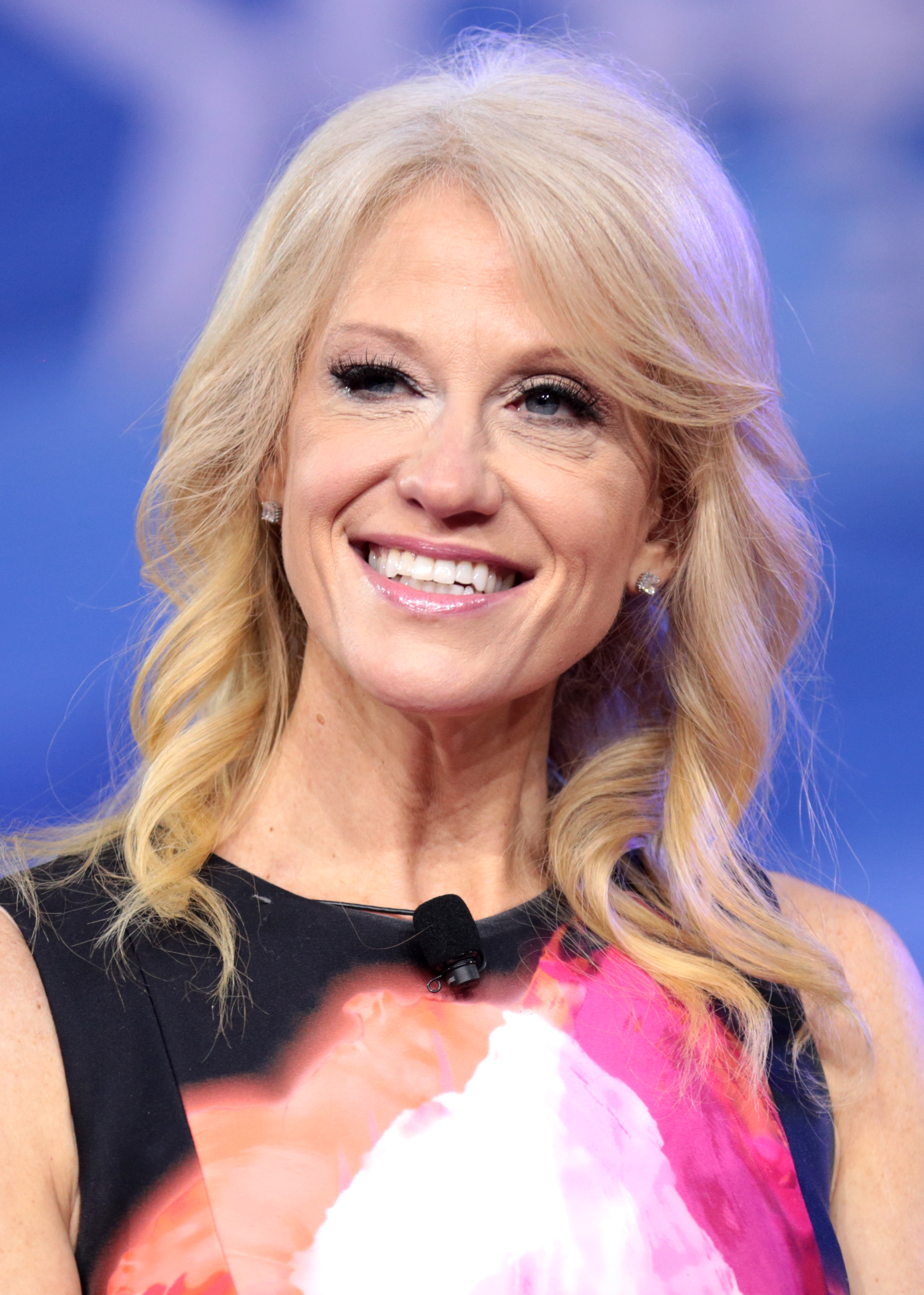
Conway

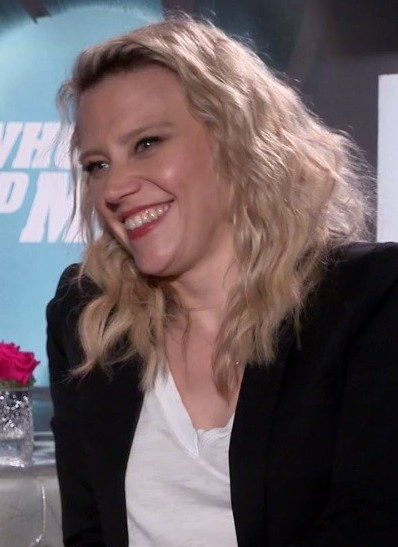
McKinnon

Kellyanne Conway served as Donald Trump's campaign manager from August 2016 until the conclusion of the 2016 presidential election, before becoming senior counselor to the president from January 2017 to August 2020. Conway's "deadpan defense of [Trump's] outlandish statements" made her a "figure of fascination", and she became a target for political satire from the sketch comedy television show Saturday Night Live (SNL).

In SNL's sketches, Conway was portrayed by Kate McKinnon, while Conway's primary interlocutor, CNN's Jake Tapper, was played by cast member Beck Bennett.

=== Characterisation ===
McKinnon's early portrayals of Conway depicted her as an exhausted and reluctant professional, increasingly frustrated by Trump's campaign. Writing for Uproxx, Steven Hyden criticized SNL's earlier sketches for presenting Conway in a "weirdly sympathetic light", claiming that the show had "absolved [her] of any responsibility for enabling her boss."

Deadline noted the evolution of McKinnon's Conway between the campaign and White House periods, observing that the portrayal had been scrubbed of "its 'what did I do to deserve this' undertone" and replaced with a more calculating, ambitious figure who "knows exactly what she deserves." Conway praised McKinnon's initial portrayal of her in "A Day Off", but later requested that SNL "make [its Kellyanne] a little bit more happy" to suit her actual personality.

== Season 42 (2016–17) ==
=== "A Day Off" ===
McKinnon's first appearance as Conway came in the pre-taped digital short "A Day Off," which aired during the episode hosted by Lin-Manuel Miranda on October 8, 2016. The sketch depicted Conway waking up on her day off and skipping around her home to Katrina and the Waves' "Walking on Sunshine", until her phone rings with a call from CNN's Jake Tapper (Beck Bennett), summoning her to explain one of Trump's latest Twitter gaffes.

The sketch repeated the same cycle, each time interrupting Conway's peace to defend increasingly outlandish Trump statements. Vanity Fair described McKinnon's Conway as a "long-suffering Trump cog constantly called upon to put out fires—and incapable of enjoying even a moment of peace".

The real Conway tweeted a clip of the sketch the following day and described the parody as "pretty spot on," saying it gave her and her family "a good laugh." She tweeted the clip directly at Tapper, asking: "we good?"

=== "The Lead with Jake Tapper" cold open ===
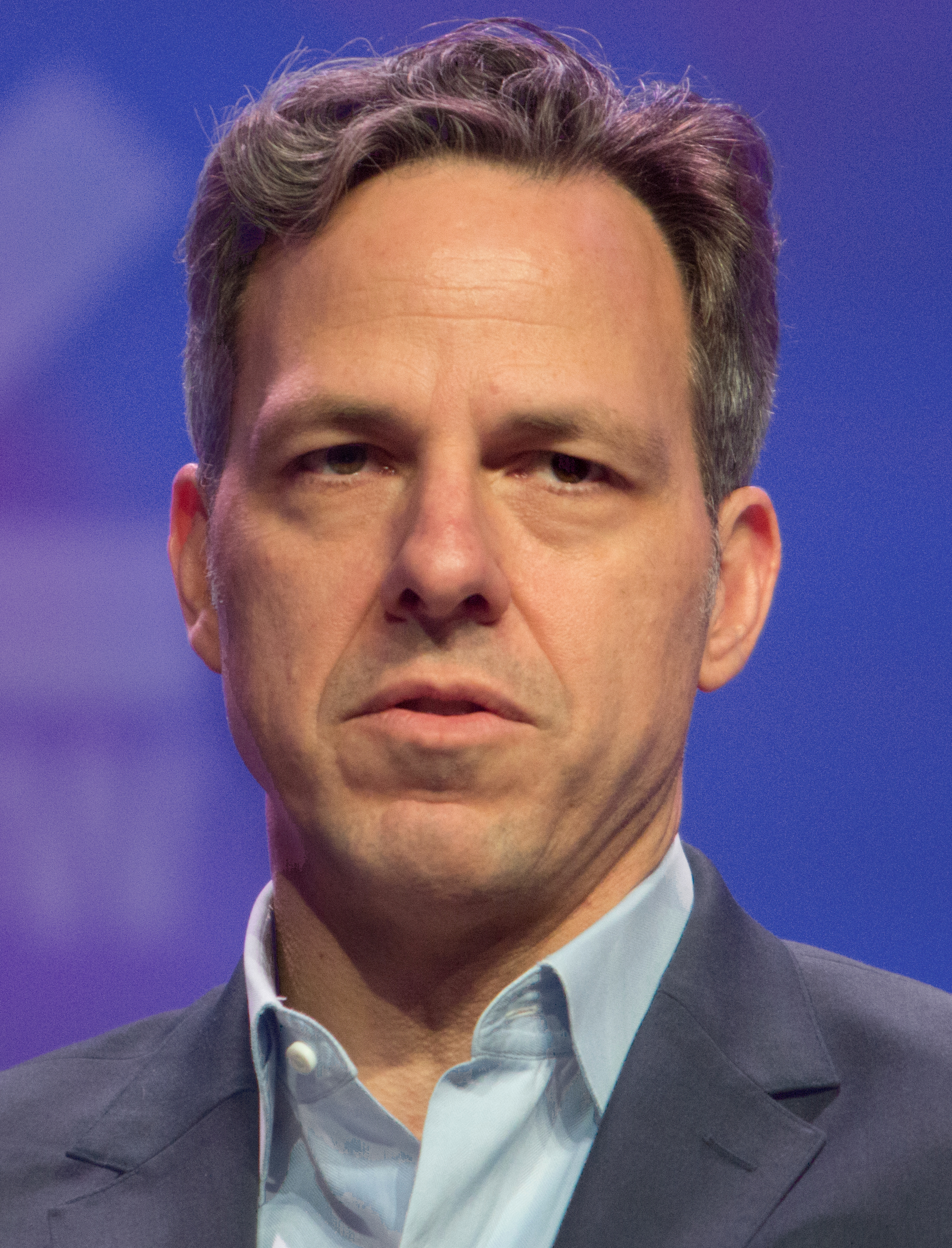
Tapper

Bennett

Released on December 10, 2016, as part of the ninth episode of season 42, "The Lead with Jake Tapper" was a cold open that saw Conway (McKinnon) interviewed on The Lead with Jake Tapper, where she defended Trump's pick for administrator of the Environmental Protection Agency—climate change skeptic Scott Pruitt—by swearing that Pruitt was "ready to protect us all from the environment". After Tapper (Bennett) questioned Trump's choices, Conway denied that the president-elect's nominees were bad, instead describing them as "alt-good", a reference to the alt-right movement.

As the sketch progressed, Conway and Tapper were joined by Walter White (Bryan Cranston), who had been chosen by Trump to lead the Drug Enforcement Administration. White, a fictional drug lord from Breaking Bad, alluded to methamphetamine several times, stating that "Trump and I agree: It's time to make America cook again."

=== Chicago parody ===
On January 21, 2017, the day after Trump's inauguration, SNL aired a pre-taped digital short beginning with Tapper (Bennett) interviewing Conway (McKinnon) on CNN. Tapper asks Conway how she can come on television every day to defend Trump, and what she gets out of it. The sketch then cuts to Conway's imagined inner life: a full musical number parodying "Roxie" from the 1975 musical Chicago, recreating the choreography from the 2002 film adaptation.

McKinnon's Conway sang lines including "The name on everybody's lips is gonna be... Conway!" and "Who says that lying's not an art?". Deadline described the sketch as "a razzle-dazzle pinnacle" of the episode, and noted that McKinnon "will want to reserve some space for this one on her next Emmy reel," adding that the portrayal had been sharpened from the campaign period: "McKinnon's new and improved Conway knows exactly what she deserves, or at least what she wants: A starring role, and now she's landed it."

Playbill applauded the sketch's accurate recreation of the actual Chicago choreography, while Vanity Fair praised McKinnon's portrayal of Conway as a "power-drunk spotlight-hogger, someone ready to make the shift from Svengali to star." At the 2018 Dorian Awards, McKinnon won TV Musical Performance of the Year for her portrayal of Conway in the parody.

=== Fatal Attraction parody ===
On February 11, 2017, SNL aired a pre-taped digital short parodying the 1987 thriller Fatal Attraction in which McKinnon's Conway, having been banned from CNN following her fabrication of the Bowling Green massacre, begins stalking Tapper at his home. Conway breaks into Tapper's apartment and begs to be put back on the air: "I just want to be a part of the news, Jake." The sketch garnered criticism from both conservatives and liberals, with suggestions that it "crossed the line in sexualising Kellyanne's role at the head of American politics." Vanity Fair noted that McKinnon's Conway was becoming "increasingly unhinged".

== Season 43 (2017–18) ==
=== "Kellywise" ===
On October 14, 2017, SNL aired a Halloween-themed pre-taped digital short parodying the 2017 film adaptation of Stephen King's It, in which McKinnon's Conway appeared as "Kellywise", a variant of the film's villain Pennywise. McKinnon donned white foundation and red lipstick traced up her cheeks, lurking in a storm drain beneath CNN's building in an attempt to lure news anchor Anderson Cooper—played by Alex Moffat in a yellow raincoat, resembling the film's character Georgie—into the sewer to give her an on-air interview.

As Cooper and Kellywise exchange dialogue, she offers him quotes: "Wait, don't go! Don't you want a quote? I give you quote. I give you crazy, crazy quote." She then shifts to a more measured Conway tone to spin the recent report that Rex Tillerson, Trump's secretary of state, had called Trump a "moron," saying: "Okay, so Secretary Tillerson did not call the president a moron. They were sharing a sundae and the president asked if he wanted more sprinkles and the secretary said, 'More on.'" The sketch, which was broadcast in advance of Halloween 2017, was "slammed" by the hosts of Fox & Friends. Co-host Pete Hegseth claimed that if SNL had done the same skit replacing Conway with Michelle Obama, it would be condemned as "racist", while Abby Huntsman criticized the impersonation for focusing on Conway's appearance rather than "her brains or her smarts".

== Season 45 (2019–20) ==
=== "A Conway Marriage Story" ===
On December 14, 2019, Scarlett Johansson hosted an episode of SNL that included a sketch parodying her new film, Marriage Story. In the sketch, Conway (McKinnon) and her then-husband George Conway (Bennett), a prominent Trump critic, meet a therapist (Johansson), who asks them to share what they love about each other, with Kellyanne stating that she likes their pet names for one another: "loser" and "ghoul". The Conways also bond over their mutual support for "small government and no food for poor[s]" as a flashback shows the couple berating a homeless man. Another flashback scene showing Kellyanne berating her husband for not being verified on Twitter—"Where's your blue check, George?"—received "considerable attention online", with Vice praising the writing as "absolutely perfect".
