= Ian Haney López =

American legal scholar (born 1964)

- Born: July 6, 1964 (age 62); Hawaii, U.S.

Academic background
- Education: Washington University in St. Louis (BA, MA); Princeton University (MPA); Harvard University (JD)

Academic work
- Discipline: Law
- Sub-discipline: Public law
- School or tradition: Critical race theory
- Institutions: University of Wisconsin; University of California, Berkeley
- Notable works: White by Law (1997)
- Website: ianhaneylopez.com

Ian F. Haney López (born July 6, 1964) is an American legal scholar who is the Chief Justice Earl Warren Professor of Public Law at UC Berkeley School of Law. He works in the area of racism and racial justice in American law.

== Life and career ==
Haney López born on July 6, 1964, in Hawaii, where he was raised. His father, Terrence Haney, is from Washington. His mother, Maria López Haney, is from El Salvador. He changed his surname from Haney to Haney López while a graduate student at Princeton University to honor the Latino tradition of using both his parents' names, though also to resist the "honorary whiteness" that is sometimes offered to accomplished people of color.

He writes on critical race theory. He gained early renown for White by Law: The Legal Construction of Race. The book explores judicial efforts to interpret the legal requirement, utilized until 1952, that one be a "white person" in order to gain naturalized citizenship. He next published Racism on Trial: The Chicano Fight for Justice, which documents how police violence helped racialize and radicalize Mexican-American activists during the late 1960s, leading to the development of a non-white Chicano identity.

Haney López also closely studies the Supreme Court's interpretation of the constitutional command of "equality". In an article, he describes the origins of the Supreme Court's doctrine of "colorblindness". Under this doctrine, state actions that expressly mention race are almost always viewed as tantamount to racism and so declared unconstitutional. The prime example is affirmative action, because these programs make the reliance on race explicit.

To understand the modern Supreme Court, Haney López began to study the politics of judicial appointments, quickly coming to recognize that the justices hostile to civil rights were appointed by presidents who campaigned on coded themes of racial threats from people of color. In 2011 he gave the annual Derrick Bell Lecture on this topic at New York University School of Law. Sherrilyn Ifill, currently head of the NAACP Legal Defense and Education Fund, named Haney López's NYU talk as the "Best lecture on race and the law" for 2011.

The presidents who campaigned against civil rights and people of color aimed to do more than win votes, Haney López then argued in Dog Whistle Politics: How Coded Racial Appeals Have Reinvented Racism and Wrecked the Middle Class. They aimed to use race as a wedge issue, splitting the Democratic New Deal coalition of the white working class, African Americans, and coastal liberals. The book traces the role of racial demagoguery in American politics in creating hostility towards liberalism and in facilitating the return of U.S. robber baron era policies. Haney López spoke at length about his findings over two full episodes with the journalist Bill Moyers. He also delivered a TEDx talk on the topic.

After publishing Dog Whistle Politics, Haney López worked with the AFL–CIO as a co-chair of their Advisory Council on Racial and Economic Justice. He also co-founded what became the "Race-Class Narrative Project," with Heather McGhee and Anat Shenker-Osorio. With the support of SEIU and polling from Celinda Lake as well as Cornell Belcher, the research team conducted interviews, focus groups, and polling that reached thousands of people of all races across the country. Their results suggest that the power of dog whistling can be neutralized by political messaging that stresses racism as a weapon of intentional division and the power of joining together across racial lines to demand that government actually work for working people.

Haney López drew on his experiences with the AFL–CIO and with the Race-Class Narrative Project to write his 2019 book, Merge Left: Fusing Race and Class, Winning Elections, and Saving America.

=== Dog whistle politics ===
Haney López has described Ronald Reagan as "blowing a dog whistle" when the candidate told stories about "Cadillac-driving 'welfare queens' and 'strapping young bucks' buying T-bone steaks with food stamps" while he was campaigning for the presidency. He argues that such rhetoric pushes middle-class white Americans to vote against their economic self-interest in order to punish "undeserving minorities" who, they believe, are receiving too much public assistance at their expense. According to Haney López, many whites, convinced by powerful economic interests that people of color are the enemy, supported politicians who promised to curb illegal immigration and crack down on crime but in doing so voted for policies that favor the extremely rich, such as slashing taxes for top income brackets, giving corporations more regulatory control over industry and financial markets, union busting, cutting pensions for future public employees, reducing funding for public schools, and retrenching the social welfare state. He argues that these same voters cannot link rising inequality which has impacted their lives to the policy agendas they support, which resulted in a massive transfer of wealth to the top one percent of the population since the 1980s.

== Works ==
- White by Law: The Legal Construction of Race. NYU Press. August 1, 1997. ISBN 978-0-8147-5137-4.
- Racism on Trial: The Chicano Fight for Justice. Harvard University Press. July 1, 2009. ISBN 978-0-674-03826-4.
- Dog Whistle Politics: How Coded Racial Appeals Have Wrecked the Middle Class. Oxford University Press. February 2014. ISBN 978-0-19-996427-7.
- Merge Left: Fusing Race and Class, Winning Elections, and Saving America. The New Press. October 2019. ISBN 978-1-62097-564-0

Anthologies

- Delgado, Richard; Stefancic, Jean (2000). "The Social Construction of Race". Critical Race Theory: The Cutting Edge. Temple University Press. pp. 163–. ISBN 978-1-56639-714-8.
