= Kellyanne Conway =

American political consultant and pollster (born 1967)

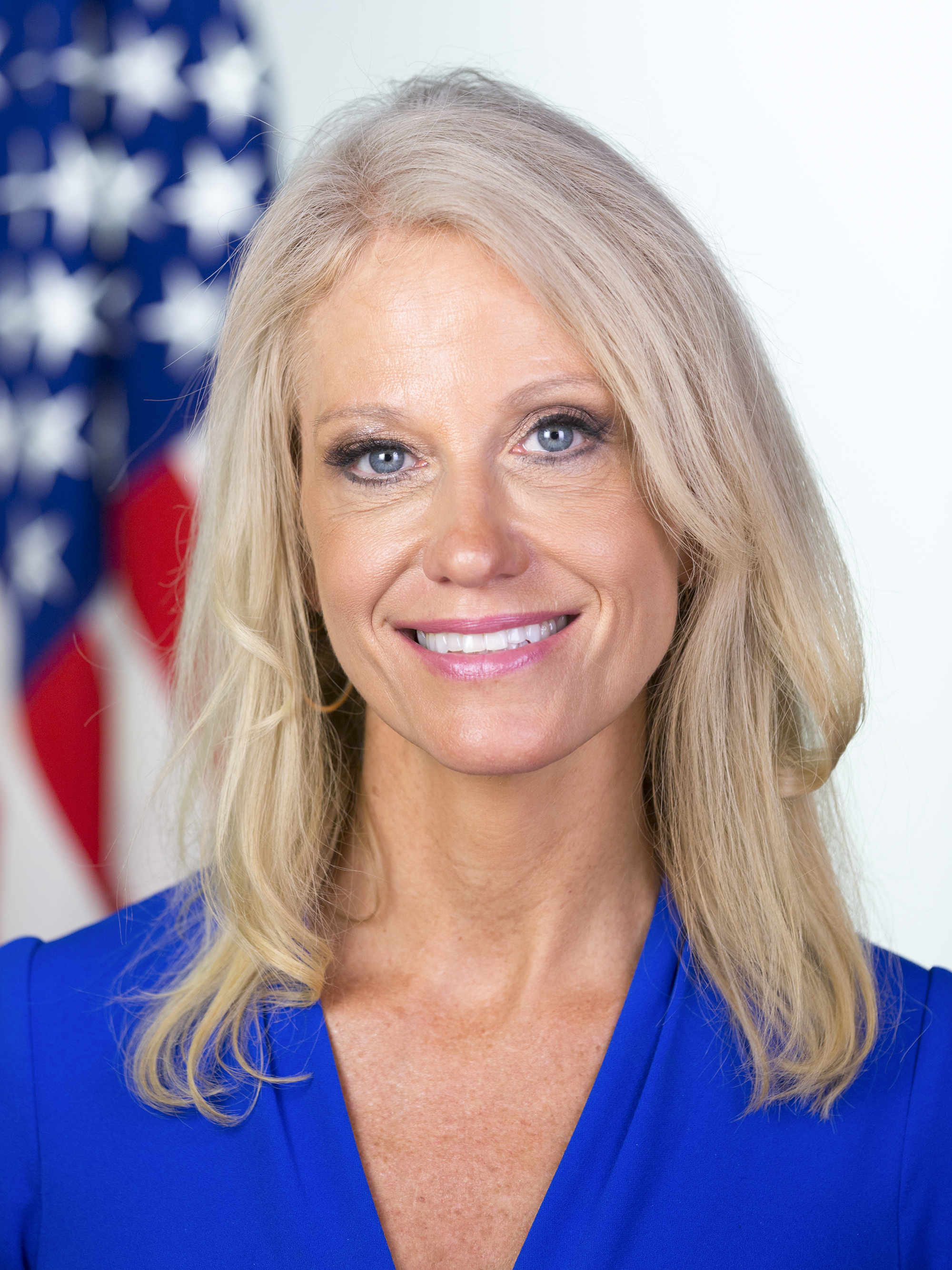
- Official portrait, 2017

Senior Counselor to the President
- In office January 20, 2017 – August 31, 2020 Serving with Steve Bannon (2017)
- President: Donald Trump
- Preceded by: John Podesta (as Counselor, 2015)
- Succeeded by: Hope Hicks; Johnny DeStefano; (as Counselors, 2020)

Personal details
- Born: Kellyanne Elizabeth Fitzpatrick; January 20, 1967 (age 59) Camden, New Jersey, U.S.
- Party: Republican
- Spouse: George Conway (m. 2001; div. 2023)
- Children: 4
- Education: Trinity Washington University (BA); George Washington University (JD)

Kellyanne Elizabeth Conway (née Fitzpatrick; born January 20, 1967) is an American political consultant and pollster who served as senior counselor to the president in the first presidency of Donald Trump from 2017 to 2020. She was previously Trump's campaign manager, having been appointed in August 2016; Conway is the first woman to have run a successful U.S. presidential campaign. She previously held roles as a campaign manager and strategist in the Republican Party and was formerly president and CEO of the Polling Company/WomanTrend.

In the 2016 Republican Party presidential primaries, Conway endorsed Ted Cruz and chaired a pro-Cruz political action committee until Cruz later dropped out of the race.

In July 2016, after Cruz dropped out the race, Trump appointed Conway as a senior advisor and later campaign manager. On December 22, 2016, Trump announced that Conway would join his administration as counselor to the president. On November 29, 2017, Attorney General Jeff Sessions announced that Conway would oversee White House efforts to combat the opioid overdose epidemic.

In Conway's role as senior counselor to the president, she used the phrase "alternative facts" to describe fictitious attendance numbers for Trump's inauguration. In 2017, members of Congress from both parties called for an investigation of an alleged ethics violation after she publicly endorsed commercial products associated with the president's daughter, Ivanka Trump. In June 2019, the U.S. Office of Special Counsel recommended that Conway be fired for "unprecedented" multiple violations of the Hatch Act of 1939, but she was not fired. In August 2020, Conway left the administration.

Conway is a frequent media commentator. In 2022, she joined Fox News as a contributor, and she appears as a guest or host on a variety of programs, including Hannity, The Five, Outnumbered, The Big Weekend Show, and others. She also contributed to Fox's 2022 midterm election coverage. In July 2024, Fox News announced that Conway would begin to host a weekly program on the network's streaming platform, Fox Nation, called Here's The Deal with Kellyanne Conway.

== Early life and education ==
Kellyanne Elizabeth Fitzpatrick was born on January 20, 1967, in Camden, New Jersey, to Diane (née DiNatale) and John Fitzpatrick, and grew up in the nearby Atco section of Waterford Township, New Jersey. Conway's father had German, English, and Irish ancestry, while her mother is of Italian descent; John Fitzpatrick owned a small trucking company, and Diane worked at a bank. Conway's parents divorced when she was three, and she was raised by her mother, grandmother, and two unmarried aunts in Atco. She graduated from St. Joseph High School in 1985 as class valedictorian. In high school, she also sang in the choir, played field hockey, worked on floats for parades, and was a cheerleader. A 1992 New Jersey Organized Crime Commission report identified Conway's grandfather, Jimmy "The Brute" DiNatale, as a mob associate of the Philadelphia crime family; DiNatale did not reside with Conway's grandmother, Conway, and the rest of her family. Conway's cousin, Mark DeMarco, has stated that while in high school, Conway ordered members of the football team to stop bullying him; according to DeMarco, the bullying stopped. Her family is Catholic.

Conway credits her experience working for eight summers on a blueberry farm in Hammonton, New Jersey, for teaching her a strong work ethic. "The faster you went, the more money you'd make," she said. At age 16, she won the New Jersey Blueberry Princess pageant. At age 20, she won the World Champion Blueberry Packing competition. "Everything I learned about life and business started on that farm," she said in September 2016.

Conway attended Trinity College, Washington, D.C., now Trinity Washington University, where she was elected to Phi Beta Kappa and graduated magna cum laude with a Bachelor of Arts in political science. In 1992, she earned a Juris Doctor with honors from the George Washington University Law School.

== Career ==
After graduation, she served as a judicial clerk for Judge Richard A. Levie of the Superior Court of the District of Columbia.

=== Pollster and consultant ===
Conway entered the polling business when she was in law school, working as a research assistant for Wirthlin Group, a Republican polling firm. After graduating, she initially considered working for a law firm, but chose to work for Luntz Research Companies instead. As a student at Trinity College, she met and became friends with Frank Luntz, the firm's founder, on a year abroad at Oxford University.

In 1995, she founded her own firm, the Polling Company, which consulted on consumer trends, including trends regarding women. Conway's clients included Vaseline, American Express, and Hasbro. She also provided political consulting service to U.S. representative Jack Kemp, U.S. Senator Fred Thompson, Vice President Dan Quayle, Speaker of the House Newt Gingrich, and U.S. representative (later Vice President) Mike Pence. She worked as the senior advisor to Gingrich during his unsuccessful 2012 United States presidential election campaign. Later, in 2012, she represented U.S. Senate candidate Todd Akin. She also directed demographic and attitudinal survey projects for trade associations and private companies, including American Express, ABC News, Major League Baseball, and Ladies Home Journal. Her firm also included WomanTrend, a research and consulting division.

=== Media commentator ===
In the 1990s, along with conservative female commentators Laura Ingraham, Barbara Olson, and Ann Coulter, she helped turn punditry into "stylish stardom" in both Washington, D.C. and cable television. and was credited with setting forth Washington, D.C.'s "sexual awakening." In a review of the era in the capital, Conway (then known as Fitzpatrick) said that her "broad mind and small waist have not switched places". Conway, Ingraham, and Coulter were sometimes called "pundettes", and appeared on Bill Maher's Politically Incorrect.

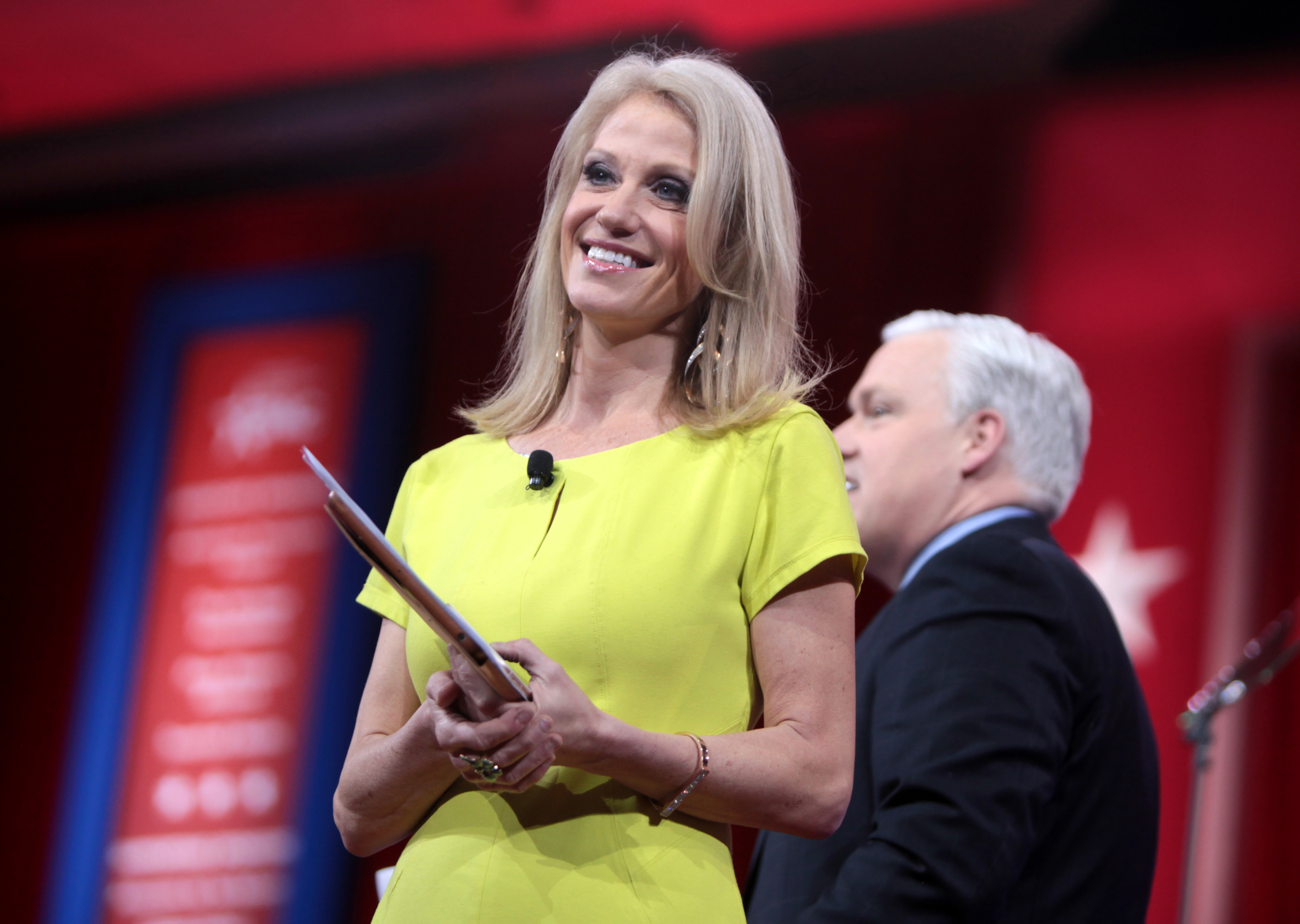
Conway in 2015

Conway appeared as a commentator on polling and politics for ABC, CBS, NBC, PBS, CNN, MSNBC, NY1, Fox News, and various radio programs. In 2004, The Washington Post recognized her with its "Crystal Ball" award for accurately predicting the outcome of that year's election.

=== 2016 presidential election ===
==== Ted Cruz support and endorsement ====
In 2016, Conway endorsed Ted Cruz's presidential candidacy, even though she became acquainted with Donald Trump when living in Trump World Tower years earlier, from 2001 to 2008, and serving on its condo board. She chaired a pro-Cruz political action committee, Keep the Promise I, which was almost entirely funded by businessman Robert Mercer. Conway's organization criticized Republican presidential candidate Donald Trump as "extreme" and "not a conservative". On January 25, 2016, Conway criticized Trump as "a man who seems to be offending his way to the nomination." On January 26, Conway criticized Trump's use of eminent domain, saying, "Donald Trump has literally bulldozed over the little guy to get his way."

In early May 2016, Cruz suspended his campaign.

==== 2016 Trump campaign ====
On July 1, 2016, Trump announced that he had hired Conway for a senior advisory position on his presidential campaign. Conway was expected to advise Trump on how to better appeal to female voters. On August 19, following the resignation of Paul Manafort, Trump named Conway the campaign's third campaign manager. She served in this capacity for ten weeks, through the November 8 general election, and was the first woman to successfully run an American presidential campaign, and the first woman to run a Republican general election presidential campaign. Saturday Night Live's Kate McKinnon began portraying Conway in the show's sketches from October 2016. In a January 2017 interview, Conway acknowledged the SNL parody by noting that, "Kate McKinnon clearly sees the road to the future runs through me and not Hillary."

=== Presidential transition ===
On November 10, 2016, Conway publicly tweeted that Trump had offered her a White House job. "I can have any job I want", she said on November 28. On November 24, Conway tweeted that she was "Receiving deluge of social media & private comms re: Romney. Some Trump loyalists warn against Romney as sec of state" with a link to an article on Trump loyalists' discontent for the 2012 nominee. Conway told CNN she was only tweeting what she has shared with President-elect Donald Trump and Vice President-elect Mike Pence in private.

On November 28, two top sources at the Trump transition team told media outlets that Trump "was furious" at Conway for media comments she made on Trump administration cabinet appointments. The following day, however, Trump released a written statement stating that the campaign sources were wrong and that he had expressed disappointment at her critical comments on Romney. CNBC reported on November 28 that senior officials in the Trump transition "have reportedly been growing frustrated by Conway's failure to become a team player."

On December 1, Conway appeared with senior aides of the Trump campaign at Harvard Kennedy School for a forum on the 2016 presidential race; the quadrennial post-presidential election forum has been held at the School of Government since 1972. Sitting across from Conway were senior Clinton campaign aides, including Clinton's campaign manager Robby Mook. As tempers began to flare, the forum escalated into a "shouting match"; during one exchange, Clinton senior strategist Joel Benenson said "The fact of the matter is that more Americans voted for Hillary Clinton than for Donald Trump." Conway replied to Benenson while looking at the Trump aides: "Hey, guys, we won. You don't have to respond. He was the better candidate. That's why he won."

In early December, Conway said that Hillary Clinton supporters were making death threats against her. Consequently, Trump assigned Secret Service to protect her. Conway gave up her Secret Service protection in September 2017 due to "reduction in threats."

=== White House advisor ===
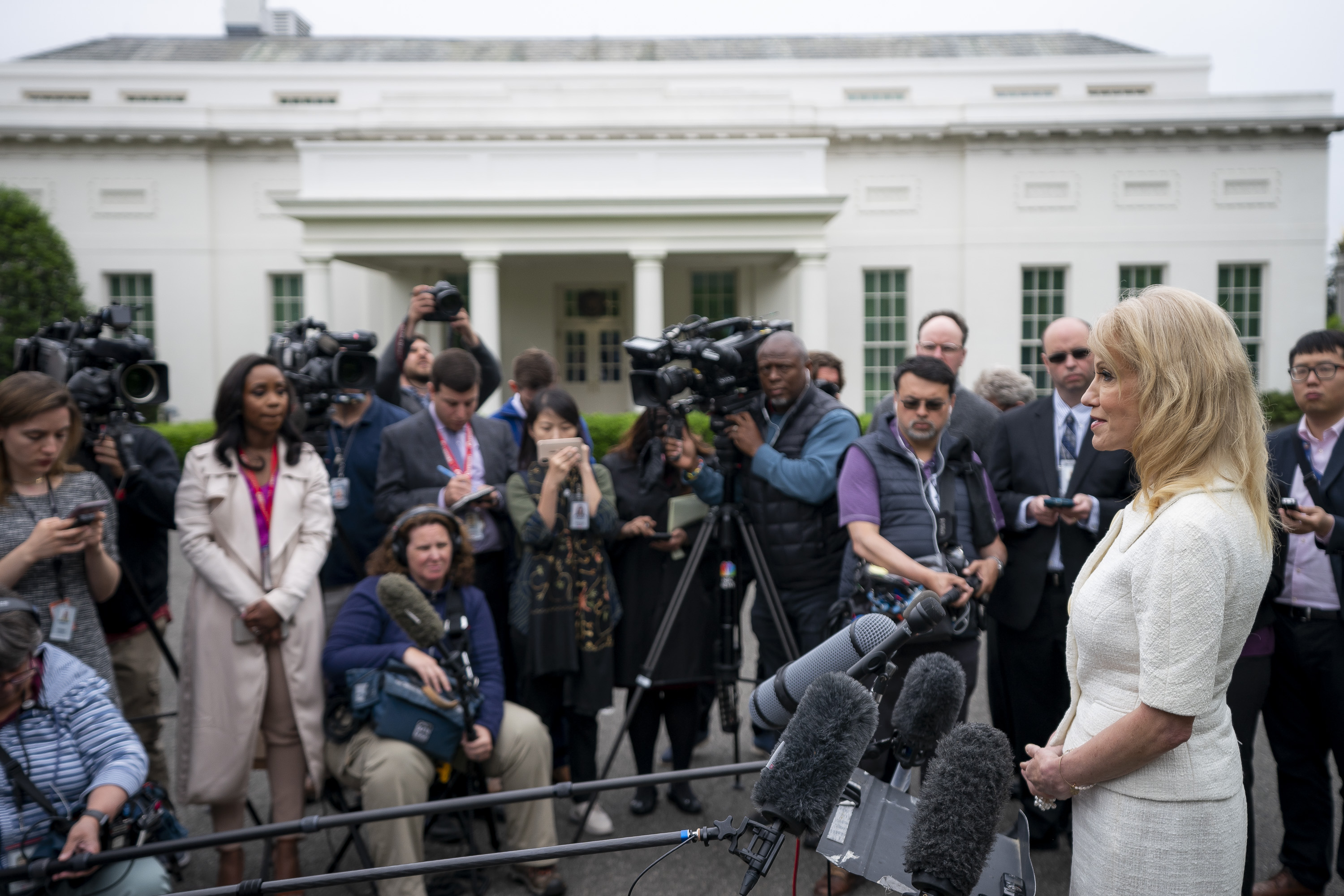
Conway speaking to press outside the White House in 2019

==== "Alternative facts" ====
During a Meet the Press interview two days after Trump's presidential inauguration, Conway used the phrase "alternative facts" to defend statements made by White House press secretary Sean Spicer regarding the inauguration's crowd size. Conway's phrase reminded some of "Newspeak", an obfuscatory language style that is a key element of the society portrayed in George Orwell's dystopian novel 1984. Soon after Conway's interview, sales of the book had increased by 9,500%, which The New York Times and others attributed to Conway's use of the phrase, making it the number-one bestseller on Amazon.com.

In January 2017, The Guardian reported that, "[a] search of several online legal dictionaries, however, did not yield any results for the term."

==== Bowling Green massacre ====
On February 2, 2017, Conway appeared in a television news show interview on Hardball with Chris Matthews. In order to justify President Trump's immigration ban, she referenced an event allegedly perpetrated by Iraqi terrorists she termed the "Bowling Green massacre". Such an event never took place. Vox suggested Conway was referring to the 2011 arrest of two Iraqi refugees in Bowling Green, Kentucky. Conway stated the next day that she meant to say "Bowling Green terrorists", both of whom had pleaded guilty to carrying out and supporting attacks on American soldiers in Iraq. There was never any suggestion that they had planned to carry out attacks in the United States.

On February 5, 2017, New York University journalism professor Jay Rosen argued that, given repeated misstatements of fact, Conway should cease being booked as a guest on television news shows. CNN opted not to book Conway as a guest that day because of what the network said were "serious questions about her credibility."

==== Hatch Act ====
The Hatch Act of 1939 states that federal government employees must not advocate for their political party while representing a public office. Violating such a law can result in such an employee being removed from public office, but not jailed. Conway has been accused of breaching the act on several occasions.

On February 9, 2017, during an appearance on Fox & Friends, Conway discussed department store Nordstrom's decision to drop products supplied by Ivanka Trump's business. "Go buy Ivanka's stuff is what I would tell you", said Conway; she elaborated "It's a wonderful line. I own some of it. I'm going to give a free commercial here: Go buy it today, everybody. You can find it online". Within hours, two organizations filed formal ethics complaints against Conway for violating federal law prohibiting use of a federal position "for the endorsement of any product, service or enterprise". Public Citizen asked the Office of Governmental Ethics (OGE) to investigate, saying that Conway's remarks reflected "an on-going careless regard of the conflicts of interest laws and regulations of some members of the Trump family and Trump Administration". The group's president, Robert Weissman, declared, "Since she said it was an advertisement, that both eliminates any question about whether outsiders are unfairly reading into what's being said, and two, it makes clear that wasn't an inadvertent remark". Citizens for Responsibility and Ethics in Washington filed a similar complaint with the OGE and with the White House Counsel's Office; the group's executive director, Noah Bookbinder, stated "This seems to us to be about as clear-cut a violation as you can find".

Harvard constitutional law professor Laurence Tribe told The New York Times "You couldn't think of a clearer example of violating the ban of using your government position as kind of a walking billboard for products or services offered by a private individual," adding "She is attempting quite crudely to enrich Ivanka and therefore the president's family." Chris Lu, deputy secretary of labor in the Obama administration, complained to Jason Chaffetz, chair of the United States House Committee on Oversight and Government Reform, that Conway had violated federal ethics laws, also saying on Twitter that, under Obama, "If we did what @KellyannePolls did, we would've been fired". Richard Painter, chief ethics attorney for George W. Bush, declined to say whether he thought Conway's statements broke the law, but that such actions would not have been tolerated in the Bush administration. "The events of the past week demonstrate that there is no intent on the part of the president, his family or the White House staff to make meaningful distinctions between his official capacity as president and the Trump family business". At the regularly scheduled afternoon press briefing, Sean Spicer told reporters that "Kellyanne has been counseled, and that's all we are going to go with ... She's been counseled on the subject, and that's it." In a direct rebuke to Spicer, Conway tweeted that Trump "likes 'counselor' more than 'counseled.'"

Conway's comments drew bipartisan congressional condemnation. Chaffetz, a Republican, called them "clearly over the line" and "unacceptable". Cummings, a Democrat and the committee's ranking member, called them "jaw-dropping". Both Chaffetz and Cummings wrote the OGE on February 9, 2017, requesting that Conway's behavior be investigated and that the office recommend "suggested disciplinary action, if warranted".

On November 24, 2017, Walter Shaub, the former director of the OGE, said that he filed an ethics complaint against Conway. He argued that Conway violated the Hatch Act when she criticized Doug Jones, a candidate in the 2017 U.S. Senate special election in Alabama. On March 6, 2018, the U.S. Office of Special Counsel (OSC) – led by Trump appointee Henry Kerner – issued its final report, determining that Conway violated the Hatch Act in two television interviews in November and December 2017.

Conway continued to make frequent television appearances and comment on political topics. In May 2019, Conway declared: "If you're trying to silence me through the Hatch Act, it's not going to work ... Let me know when the jail sentence starts".

On June 13, 2019, the OSC formally recommended that Conway be removed from federal service, citing multiple Hatch Act violations by Conway since the preparation of its 2018 report, "by disparaging Democratic presidential candidates while speaking in her official capacity during television interviews and on social media". The OSC noted her criticism from February to May 2019 of candidates such as Amy Klobuchar, Bernie Sanders, Beto O'Rourke, Cory Booker, Elizabeth Warren, Joe Biden and Kirsten Gillibrand, and also called her violations "egregious, notorious, and ongoing". The OSC noted that this was the first time they "had to issue multiple reports to the President concerning Hatch Act violations by the same individual". In an interview, Kerner characterized his agency's recommendation as unprecedented, adding, "You know what else is unprecedented? Kellyanne Conway's behavior."

Due to Conway's status as a presidential appointee, the OSC was unable to take any steps to implement its recommendation, but it was submitted to the President for consideration. The White House immediately rejected the finding and demanded that it be withdrawn by the OSC. Trump said he thought the recommendation was "very unfair, it's called freedom of speech."

On June 26, 2019, Conway did not appear at a hearing by the House Committee on Oversight and Reform, leading that committee to issue a subpoena for her. At that hearing, Special Counsel Henry Kerner testified that Conway had been found guilty of two Hatch Act violations in 2018 and 11 in 2019. In comparison, during the eight years of the Obama administration, only two federal employees were found guilty of violating the Hatch Act, with one violation each.

==== Michael Flynn comments ====
On February 13, 2017, Conway claimed that former national security advisor Michael Flynn had the president's "full confidence". Hours later, Flynn resigned. The following day, Conway claimed Flynn had offered to resign, but White House press secretary Sean Spicer said Trump had asked Flynn for his resignation. It was then reported that Conway had allegedly leaked negative stories about Spicer to the press.

On February 15, the MSNBC news show Morning Joe officially banned Conway from future appearances. The show's primary host Joe Scarborough said the decision to ban Conway from the show was based on her being "out of the loop" and "in none of the key meetings".

== Subsequent activities ==
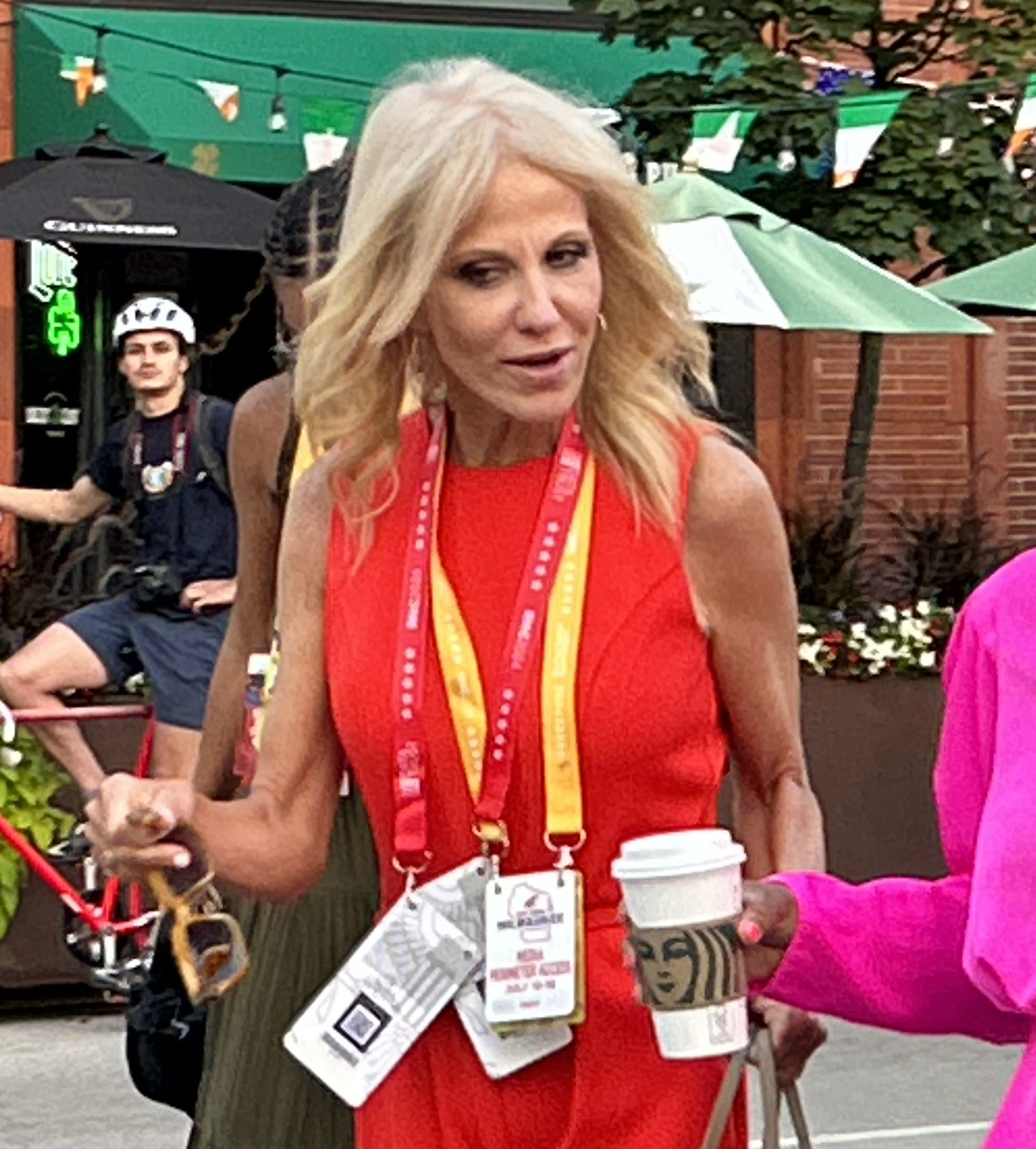
Conway attending the 2024 Republican National Convention

In September 2021, President Biden sent Conway a letter requesting that she resign from her position on the U.S. Air Force Academy's board of visitors, informing her that she would otherwise be dismissed from it. Biden sent similar letters to eleven other political officials that Trump had appointed to military academy boards. Conway refused President Biden's request that she resign, and argued that her removal from the board broke norms, politicized the post, and would discourage others from serving on such boards in the future.

In 2022, Conway joined Fox News as a contributor. She frequently appears as a guest/host on a variety of programs, including Hannity, The Five, Outnumbered, The Big Weekend Show, and more. Conway also contributed to Fox's 2022 midterm election coverage. Conway hosted a weekly program called Here's The Deal with Kellyanne Conway on Fox Nation from July 2024 to November 2024.

In April 2022, Conway joined the board of the America First Policy Institute. In November 2022, Conway gave an on the record interview to the United States House Select Committee on the January 6 Attack. On March 1, 2023, Conway spoke with prosecutors from the Manhattan district attorney's office as part of their criminal investigation into Trump

In December 2023, Conway met with congressional Republicans and argued that it was electorally necessary for them to support protections of access to birth control, citing public approval for such protection. Shortly after the Supreme Court of Alabama delivered their February 2024 ruling in LePage v. Center for Reproductive Medicine, Conway's firm shared polls that they had conducted demonstrating broad public support for protections of IVF and fertility treatments, even among Americans opposed to abortion and self-identifying evangelicals.

In 2024, Conway was paid by the Club for Growth to advocate on behalf of the social media app TikTok and its parent company, ByteDance. In this capacity, Conway lobbied against efforts to restrict or force the sale of TikTok amid congressional consideration of the Protecting Americans from Foreign Adversary Controlled Applications Act.

Conway delivered a speech on the third night of the 2024 Republican National Convention.

== Political views ==
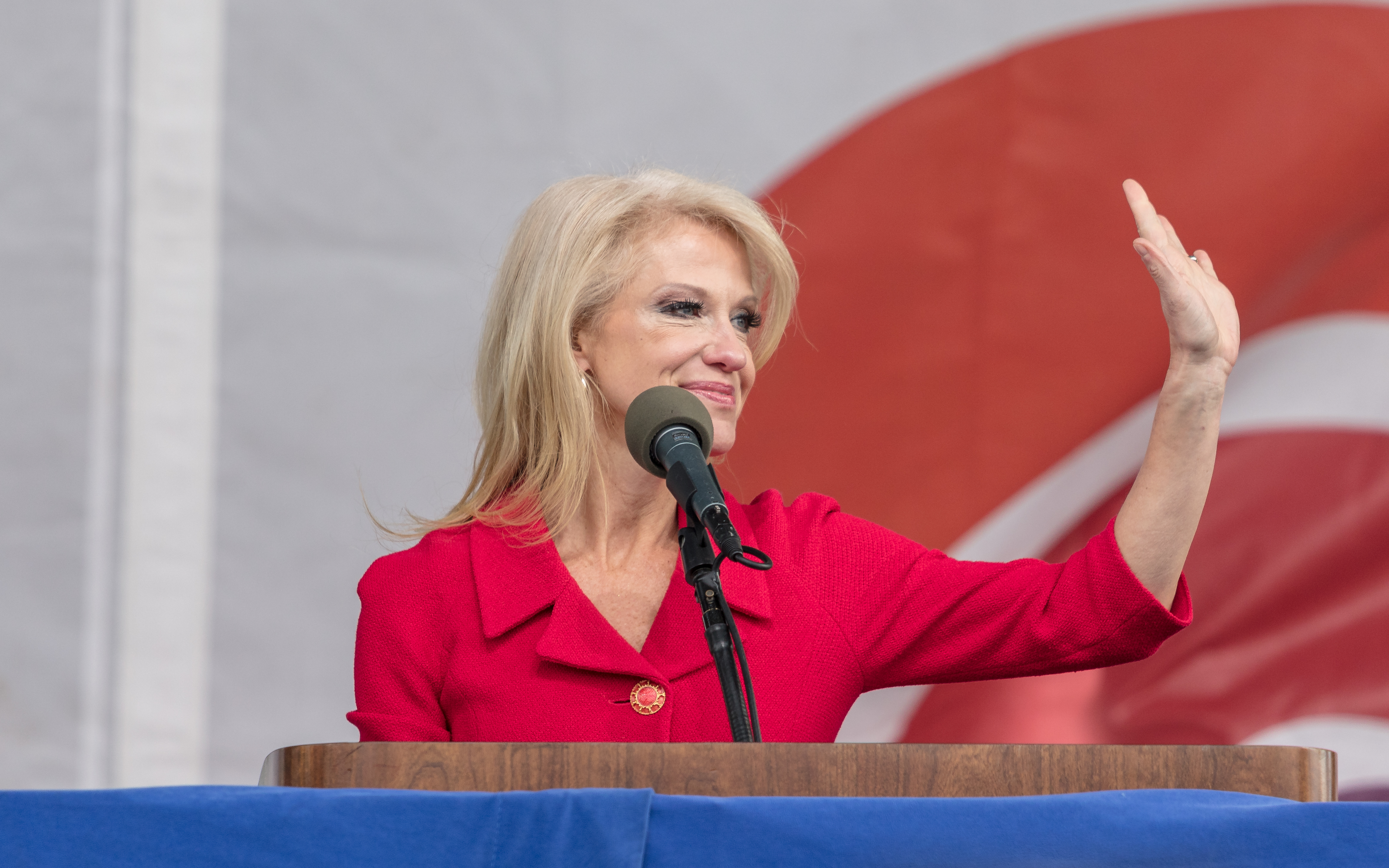
Conway addressing the 2017 March for Life in Washington, D.C.

Conway views herself as a Generation X conservative. Conway is anti-abortion, saying in 1996: "We're pro-life. The fetus beat us. We grew up with sonograms. We know life when we see it." She spoke at the 2017 March for Life, an annual rally protesting abortion and Roe v. Wade.

She does not consider herself a feminist "in a classical sense", saying that she believes the term is associated with being "anti-male" and "pro-abortion", but identifies as what she calls an "individual feminist". Conway has opined that many feminists fail to accept women who are pro-life and conservative, and that they "'mainly care about what happens from the waist down... It's an insult. You know, it's [from] the waist up for me – my eyes, my ears, my head, my heart, my mouth certainly.'" She has also said that "nobody cared" about her experience with sexual harassment and her Me Too moment because of her political views.

== Personal life ==
Conway was married to George Conway, who is of counsel at the law firm Wachtell, Lipton, Rosen & Katz, and wrote the Supreme Court brief for Paula Jones during the Clinton impeachment in 1998. The former couple have four children: twins Claudia and George IV, Charlotte, and Vanessa. Prior to Trump's presidency, they lived in Alpine, New Jersey. Prior to her marriage, Conway dated senator Fred Thompson.

George Conway is a critic of Trump; in December 2019 he co-founded the Lincoln Project, which campaigned against Trump's re-election from a conservative perspective. In March 2019, Trump responded to criticism from Kellyanne's husband George by describing George as a "stone cold LOSER & husband from hell". Kellyanne defended Trump by saying that George Conway is "not a psychiatrist" and that Trump should not be expected to respond when George, "a non-medical professional accuses him of having a mental disorder".

Conway's daughter Claudia is a TikTok influencer who became known in 2020, at age 15, for her anti-Trump messages. Claudia identifies as a leftist and liberal and described her TikTok fan base as "leftist, A.C.A.B. (All Cops Are Bastards), anti-trump, blm (Black Lives Matter)". Claudia and Kellyanne were once estranged but had reconciled as of 2024.

In September 2019, Conway's cousin Giovanna Coia, who was then White House press assistant, married Vice President Mike Pence's nephew John Pence, who worked for the Donald Trump 2020 presidential campaign.

One of the few White House staffers to have Secret Service protection due to various threats, Conway chose "Blueberry" as her Secret Service code name because of associations with the fruit from her youth in pageants and berry picking.

In a September 2018 interview with Jake Tapper on CNN, Conway stated she was the victim of a sexual assault.

On August 23, 2020, Conway announced her resignation in order to "spend more time with her family," as did her husband George, who announced he had taken time off from the Lincoln Project and Twitter.

In March 2023, George and Kellyanne announced that they were divorcing after 22 years of marriage.

== Awards ==
Year	Award	Category	Nominated work	Result	Ref.
2019	39th Golden Raspberry Awards	Worst Supporting Actress	Fahrenheit 11/9	Won	

== Books ==
In 2005, Conway and Democratic pollster Celinda Lake co-authored What Women Really Want: How American Women Are Quietly Erasing Political, Racial, Class, and Religious Lines to Change the Way We Live (Free Press/Simon & Schuster, 2005; ISBN 0-7432-7382-6).

In 2022, Conway authored Here's the Deal: A Memoir (Threshold Editions, 2022; ISBN 1982187344).

Political offices
Vacant Title last held by John Podesta	Counselor to the President; 2017–2020; Served alongside: Steve Bannon, Dina Powell, Hope Hicks, and Derek Lyons	Succeeded by Steve Ricchetti and Jeffrey Zients
