= Anat Shenker-Osorio =

American political strategist

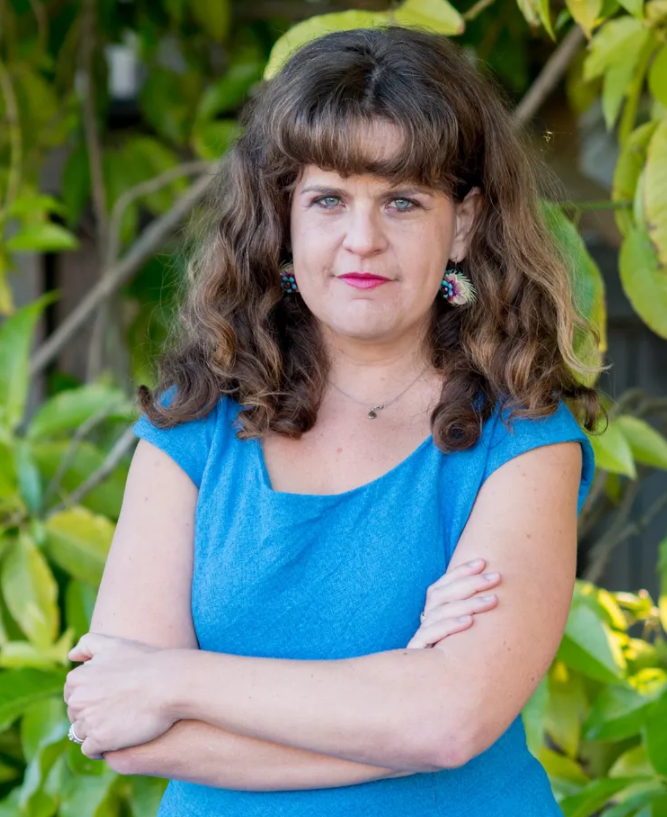
- Born: Anat Shenker; 1978 (age 47–48); Tel Aviv, Israel
- Spouse: Donaldo Osorio

Academic background
- Education: Columbia University; University of California, Berkeley

Academic work
- Discipline: Public Policy
- Institutions: ASO Communications
- Main interests: Public Relations, Communication, Dancing
- Notable works: Don't Buy It: The Trouble with Talking Nonsense about the Economy (2012)

Anat Shenker-Osorio is an American political strategist and messaging consultant. She is the Principal and Founder of ASO Communications, author of Don’t Buy It: The Trouble with Talking Nonsense About the Economy, and the host of the Words to Win By podcast.

== Early life and education ==
Anat Shenker-Osorio was born in Tel-Aviv, Israel and moved to the United States with her family as a child. There, she attended high school in Madison, Wisconsin. After high school, she moved to New York City where she obtained her BA in Political Science from Columbia University in 1999.

Shenker-Osorio obtained an MA in public policy from the University of California, Berkeley in 2005.

In 2018, Shenker-Osorio was an Open Society Foundations fellow.

She lives in California with her husband and two children.

== Communications career ==
In 2009 Shenker-Osorio founded ASO Communications, a progressive political communications firm that conducts research to improve messaging and to develop digital content, branding and campaign strategy.

In 2017 Shenker-Osorio collaborated with Heather McGee and Ian Haney López, alongside Lake Research Partners, Brilliant Corners, SEIU and Demos, to create the Race Class Narrative (RCN) project, with the goal of developing a narrative incorporating race and class that would neutralize the use of dog-whistle racism, resonate with people of color, and bring along the largest possible group of white people in support of economic and racial justice policy solutions. RCN has been utilized by various campaigns across the U.S. and is implemented by ASO Communications’ sister organization, We Make the Future.

ASO Communications co-hosts the Global Messaging Programme with the organization, NEON. Shenker-Osorio is an Advisor to the Research Collaborative.

== Podcast ==
Shenker-Osorio is the host of the Wonder Media Network podcast Words to Win By, which profiles progressive wins from around the world and the strategies and messages used to achieve them. Seasons 1, 2 and 3 highlight winning campaigns across the United States, Ireland, New Zealand, Australia, Switzerland, the Dominican Republic, Argentina, Costa Rica, and Brazil.

Season 2, episode 1 “All in Wisconsin: Winning the 2020 Election” won a 2022 Communicator Award of Distinction for an individual episode, public service and activism podcast.

== Publications ==
Shenker-Osorio is the author of Don’t Buy It: The Trouble with Talking Nonsense about the Economy which was published in 2012 and recommends significant changes in how progressive politicians and organizations speak about economic issues, including taxes, and makes recommendations on how to reach voters through the unapologetic presentation of simple messages that reframe the economy as a construct subject to rules and regulation.

Shenker-Osorio has authored opinion columns for such publications as Rolling Stone and the Chicago Tribune.

== Presentations ==
Shenker-Osorio has spoken at venues such as the Congressional Progressive Caucus, Centre for Australian Progress, Irish Migrant Centre, Open Society Foundations, Ford Foundation and LUSH International.

She has twice delivered keynote addresses at the Netroots Nation political convention for American progressive activists.

== Media appearances ==
Shenker-Osorio has appeared on such television shows as MSNBC’s The Last Word and The Mehdi Hasan Show, CNN International’s Amanpour, Dan Abrams Live, and PBS News Weekend. She participated in podcasts including Our America with Julián Castro, the Ezra Klein Show, Crooked Media’s Pod Save America, The Wilderness and Political Experts React, MeidasTouch, Majority 54, The Intercept's Deconstructed, Slate's Amicus, Slate’s What Next, The Daily Beast's The New Abnormal and Daily Kos's The Downballot. She has also appeared on the radio shows of WBUR's On Point, WNYC's The Brian Lehrer Show, WNYC’s On the Media, KQED, and Tavis Smiley.

== Bibliography ==
=== Books ===
- Don't Buy It: The Trouble with Talking Nonsense about the Economy. PublicAffairs. September 2012. ISBN 978-1-61039-177-1.

=== Articles ===
- Shenker-Osorio, Anat. “Biden is Playing Right Into the GOP’s Hands on Immigration.” Rolling Stone (2024).
- Shenker-Osorio, Anat. “Voters are resistant to Donald Trump’s immunity claims.” Chicago Tribune (2024).
- Shenker-Osorio, Anat. “Dems Need to Get in the Ring With MAGA. Take It From Voters.” Rolling Stone (2024).
- Shenker-Osorio, Anat. “Why Kamala Harris’ New Politics of Joy Is the Best Way to Fight Fascism.” Rolling Stone (2024).
- Shenker-Osorio, Anat. "Why Americans All Believe They Are 'Middle Class'." The Atlantic 1 (2013).
- Shenker-Osorio, Anat. "Taking Refuge from Our Rhetoric: A Language Analysis on Behalf of Asylum Seekers and Refugees." Words that Work (2015).
- Shenker-Osorio, Anat. "Messaging This Moment: A Handbook for Progressive Communicators." Centre for Community Change (2017).
- López, Ian Haney, Anat Shenker-Osorio, and Tamara Draut. "Democrats Can Win by Tackling Race and Class Together. Here's Proof." The Guardian (2018).
- Eisen, Norman, Celinda Lake and Anat Shenker-Osorio. “A Trump Conviction Could Cost Him Enough Voters to Tip the Election.” The New York Times (2023).
