= Here's the Deal (Conway memoir) =

2022 autobiography by Kellyanne Conway

Here's the Deal: A Memoir
- Author: Kellyanne Conway
- Subject: Autobiography
- Publisher: Threshold Editions
- Publication date: May 24, 2022
- Pages: 512
- ISBN: 9781982187347

Here's the Deal: A Memoir is a 2022 autobiography by Kellyanne Conway.
