= Orly Shenker =

Orly Ruth Shenker (Hebrew: אורלי שנקר; born 1960) is an Israeli philosopher of physics and philosopher of mind whose research topics have included Maxwell's demon, entropy and fractal geometry, viewed through a form of physicalism that she calls "flat physicalism". She is a professor of philosophy at the Hebrew University of Jerusalem where she holds the Eleanor Roosevelt Chair in History and Philosophy of Science. Until 2021 she was director of the Sidney M. Edelstein Centre for History and Philosophy of Science, Technology and Medicine. She is also founding president of The Pond: Network of Philosophy of Science around the Mediterranean, and editor-in-chief of the book series Jerusalem Studies in Philosophy and History of Science.

== Education and career ==
Shenker completed a Ph.D. in philosophy of science at the Hebrew University of Jerusalem in 1997. She was a postdoctoral researcher at the University of Cambridge, University of Oxford, Hebrew University, and University of Haifa before becoming a lecturer at the London School of Economics in 2000. She moved to the College of Management Academic Studies in 2002, the Open University of Israel in 2004, and the University of Haifa in 2008 before taking her present position at the Hebrew University in 2010. She became director of the Edelstein Centre in 2013 and was given the Roosevelt Chair in 2017.

== Books ==
With Meir Hemmo, Shenker is co-author of the book The Road to Maxwell's Demon: Conceptual Foundations of Statistical Mechanics (Cambridge University Press, 2012). She is also co-editor with Hemmo of Quantum, Probability, Logic: Itamar Pitowsky’s Work and Influence (Springer, 2020).

== Recognition ==
Shenker was elected to the Academia Europaea in 2020.
