= Bowling Green massacre =

Nonexistent event

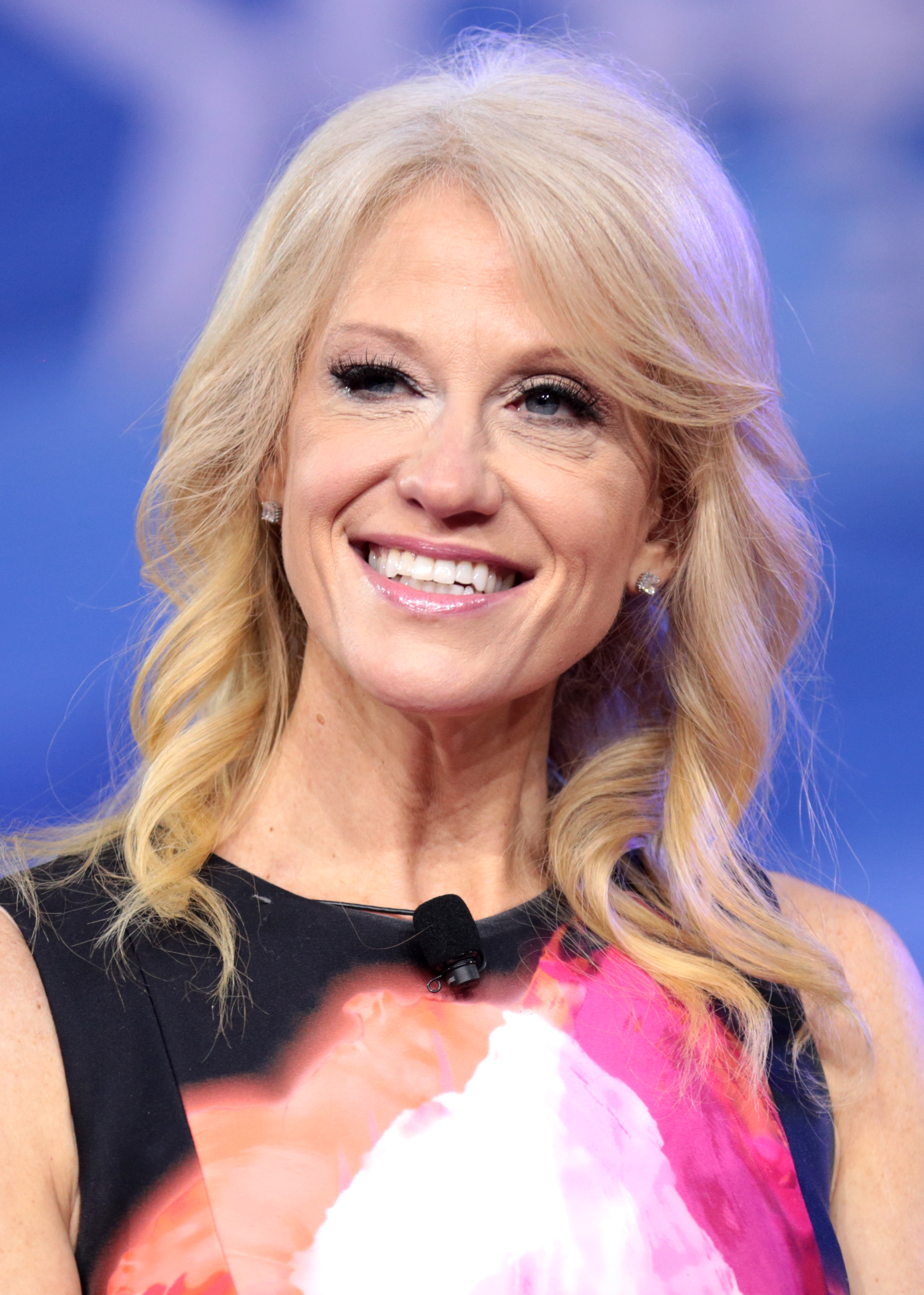
Kellyanne Conway in 2017

The Bowling Green massacre is a fictitious incident of Islamic terrorism mentioned by Kellyanne Conway, then–counselor to President Donald Trump, in interviews with Cosmopolitan and TMZ on January 29, 2017, and in an interview on the MSNBC news program Hardball with Chris Matthews on February 2, 2017. Conway cited it as justification for a travel and immigration ban from seven Muslim-majority countries enacted by United States president Trump. However, no such massacre occurred.

The day after the interview, Conway said she misspoke and had been referring to the 2011 arrest of two Iraqi refugees in Bowling Green, Kentucky, on charges including "attempting to provide material support to terrorists and to al-Qaeda in Iraq". She said she had mentioned the incident because it led President Barack Obama to tighten immigration procedures for Iraqi citizens.

The false statement went viral and became the top trending topic on Twitter, with many tweets parodying it. A website was set up anonymously for the purpose of collecting donations for supposed victims. Facebook users used the site's safety check feature to act as if the event were real. Mock vigils were held in Kentucky and New York in commemoration. It provoked widespread press reaction, with many relating it to Conway's earlier use of the phrase "alternative facts" to describe false statements by White House press secretary Sean Spicer in the wake of Trump's inauguration.

== Background ==
=== Terrorism-related arrests ===
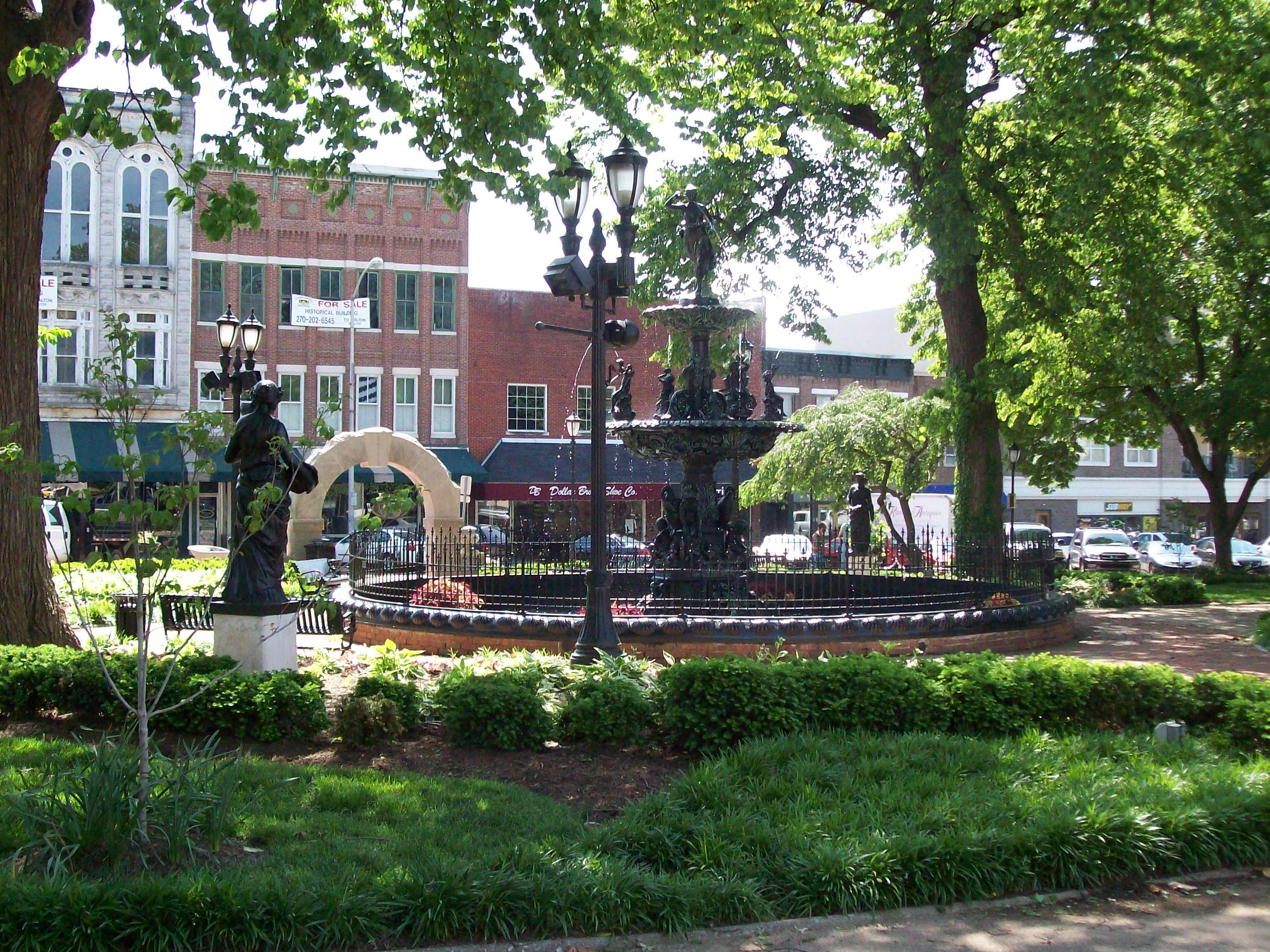
Bowling Green, Kentucky, the city Conway named as the attack site

In 2011, two Iraqi men who had entered the country as refugees were arrested in Bowling Green, Kentucky, on federal terrorism charges after they attempted to send both money and weapons to al-Qaeda in Iraq. Both were convicted of supporting attacks on the U.S. military while they were still in Iraq as well as attempting to provide material support to al-Qaeda in Iraq after they emigrated to the United States. Arrests were made on various charges, including "attempting to provide material support to terrorists and to al Qaeda in Iraq".

Before entering the U.S., both had used improvised explosive devices in Iraq, although this was not known at the time of their admission. Both pleaded guilty; one is serving a life sentence while the other is serving 40 years in federal prison. The two did not attack anyone in the U.S., and there was no evidence that the men traveled back to Iraq or had any contact with the Islamic State of Iraq and the Levant after being admitted to the U.S. Neither was charged with plotting attacks inside the United States.

In response to the arrests, the administration of Barack Obama re-vetted 58,000 refugees already in the country, imposed vetting on 25,000 other Iraqi citizens still in Iraq, and significantly tightened the processing of Iraqi visa and refugee applications for six months. Obama also instituted a requirement for new background checks on visa applicants from Iraq; as a result, Iraq travel visas were issued more slowly. The changes in visa verification were temporary, and some Iraqi refugees continued to be admitted to the United States throughout the period.

=== Similar possible misstatements ===
In September 2014, on Fox News Sunday, U.S. Representative Peter King of New York referred to Iraqi nationals arrested in 2011 in Kentucky as having been involved in an attempt to "attack either Fort Campbell or Fort Knox". The fact-checking site PolitiFact.com, which evaluated the statement as being false, found that he had said something similar at least seven times previously.

On January 29–30, 2017, White House Press Secretary Sean Spicer stated that Islamist terrorists perpetrated a terrorist attack in Atlanta, even though Atlanta has never had a terrorist attack carried out by Islamists. The initial comment was made on ABC's This Week, and then Spicer repeated the claim on MSNBC's Morning Joe the following day. Spicer later said that he meant Orlando, referring to the mass shooting carried out by U.S.-born Omar Mateen. There have been two terrorist attacks in Atlanta: the 1996 Centennial Olympic Park bombing, which was committed by domestic terrorist Eric Rudolph, and the 1958 Hebrew Benevolent Congregation Temple bombing.

A day later, on January 31, two days before the Hardball interview with Conway, Kentucky senator Rand Paul referenced the 2011 case in an interview with MSNBC by mentioning "the possibility or the attempted bombing in Bowling Green, Kentucky, where I live". The Washington Post's Fact Checker noted that Paul's statement was truer than Conway's because the Iraqi nationals did discuss bombing an Army target in the United States, even though neither was charged with making actual plans to do so.

== False statements by Conway ==
On January 29, 2017, in an interview with Cosmopolitan, Conway said that Obama had limited Iraqi immigration because "two Iraqi nationals came to this country, joined ISIS, traveled back to the Middle East to get trained and refine their terrorism skills, and come back here, and were the masterminds behind the Bowling Green massacre of taking innocent soldiers' lives away".

On the same day, in a brief interview with TMZ, Conway stated: "He did that because, I assume, there were two Iraqis who came here, got radicalized, joined ISIS, and then were the masterminds behind the Bowling Green attack on our brave soldiers."

Three days later, on February 2, in an interview with Chris Matthews on MSNBC's Hardball with Chris Matthews, Conway described the "Bowling Green massacre" as an attack of terrorism carried out within the United States by refugees. Conway said:

I bet, there was very little coverage ‍—‌ I bet it's brand new information to people that President Obama had a six-month ban on the Iraqi refugee program after two Iraqis came here to this country, were radicalized ‍—‌ and they were the masterminds behind the Bowling Green massacre. I mean, most people don't know that because it didn't get covered.

== Aftermath ==
On February 3, the day after her MSNBC interview, Conway said she misspoke and that she meant to use the term "Bowling Green terrorists" instead of "Bowling Green massacre", referring to the two Iraqi men arrested in 2011. The Washington Post subsequently mentioned previous statements by Conway in which she had made reference to the nonexistent massacre, indicating that "now she doesn't appear to have misspoken at all; she seems to have believed that the Bowling Green massacre was a real thing."

Conway's statement that the men became "radicalized" in the United States was found to be incorrect, as they had been radicalized outside of the country. Conway's statement that President Obama "had a six-month ban on the Iraqi refugee program" was misleading, as the Obama administration move was not a formal ban. Contrary to Conway's claims, there is no evidence that the men had traveled back to the Middle East or had any contact with ISIS after being admitted to the United States. Neither of the two was ever charged with plotting attacks inside the United States.

Conway, in her February 3 statement, said that there was no coverage of the Bowling Green investigation, which she intended to refer to. However, there were approximately 90 news articles that covered the arrest and charges at the time. Conway's February 3 statement cited an example of that coverage, without acknowledging that her claim that "it didn't get covered" was also incorrect.

On February 5, CNN declined an interview with Conway, partly because of "serious questions about her credibility" and partly because CNN could not get Mike Pence, whom the administration made available to all the other major Sunday shows. That day, she said in a text exchange, "Frankly they were terrorists in Bowling Green but their massacre took place in Iraq." Two days later, she was a guest on CNN, interviewed on air by Jake Tapper. In the interview, Conway apologized for repeatedly referencing a "Bowling Green massacre" that did not happen.

In a March 2017 interview with New York, Conway said she intended to say "Bowling Green masterminds" rather than "Bowling Green massacre", in reference to "would-be terrorists who were apprehended before they staged an attack".

== Reactions ==
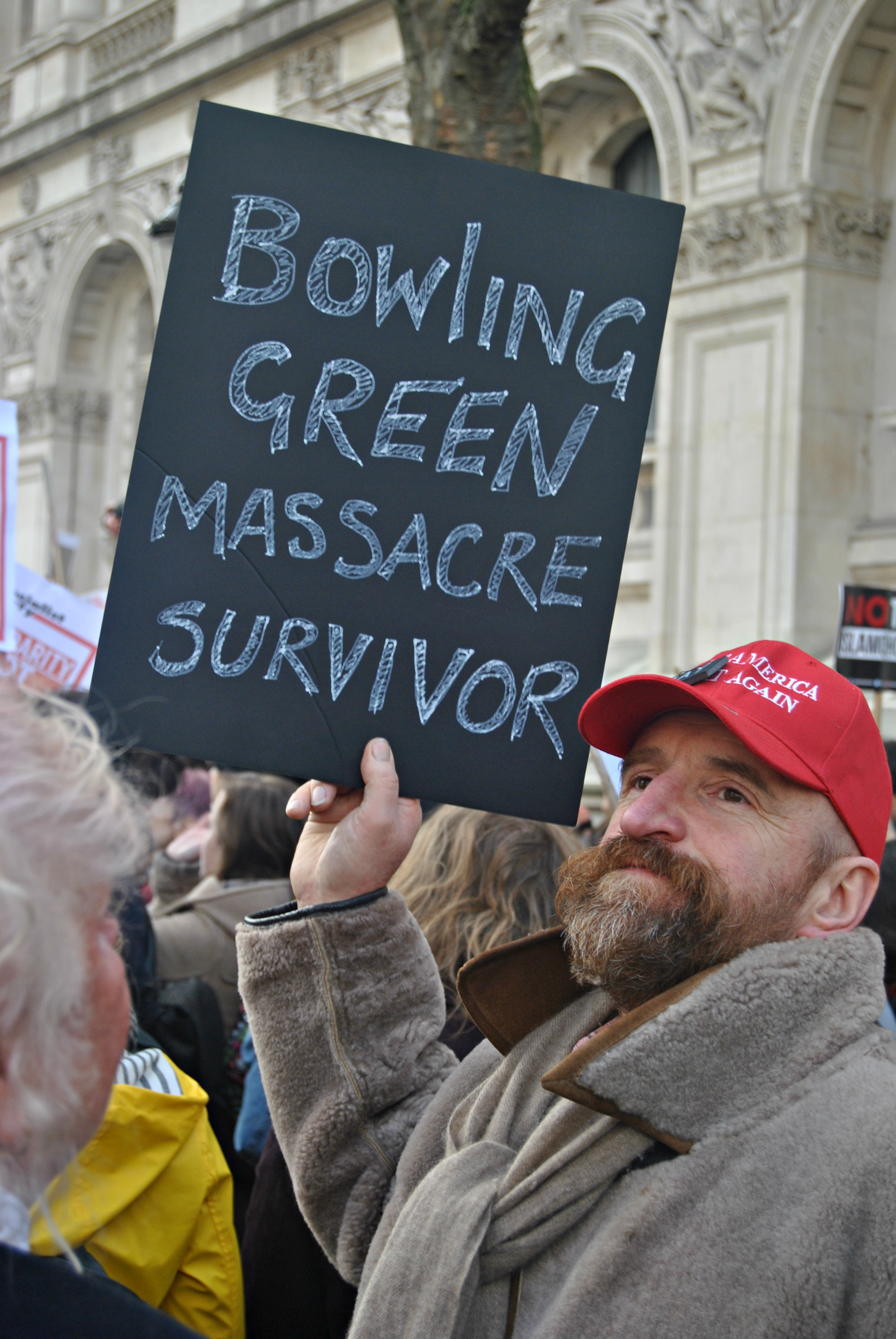
A protester in London on February 4, 2017

The video clip of Conway's "massacre" statement went viral online, with the phrase becoming the top trending topic on Twitter. Some Twitter users wrote that, despite Conway's clarification, substituting "terrorists" for "massacre" in her statement did not make sense. Her statement was parodied on Twitter and other platforms with people creating fake tributes. A website was set up anonymously for the purpose of collecting donations for victims of the imaginary massacre; the donation link on the website goes to the ACLU's donation page. Facebook users mocked the Bowling Green massacre by using Facebook's safety check feature to pretend the event was real. In New York City's Bowling Green, people held a mock vigil to commemorate the "victims" of the "massacre". Another mock vigil took place on February 3, 2017, in Bowling Green, Kentucky. Responses on the Donald Trump-centric subreddit /r/The_Donald were "varied – and rather muted", with some redditors speculating that it was an intentional part of a larger strategy by the Trump administration.

Samantha Schmidt wrote in The Washington Post: "Conway has taken 'alternative facts' to a new level". The Atlantic wrote that her "false statement stands out because it is simultaneously inaccurate and has the potential to be extremely inflammatory". Brian Stelter on CNN criticized the Trump administration for "hammering" the media for mistakes but going easy on Conway's error. British journalist Marina Hyde wrote a column in The Guardian criticizing the Trump administration for creating a fictional massacre when it was silent on the Quebec City mosque shooting. UK talk show The Last Leg's Alex Brooker commented: "Are there so few shootings in America that they're having to make them up?" Cosmopolitan reporter Kristen Mascia said: "It didn't surprise me that the comment was premeditated and that she'd tried it on multiple writers (who knows who else she auditioned it with, frankly). But others out there may not know this about her, and they should. We must call out the [White House] for stuff like this because it's egregious and totally unacceptable." After Chelsea Clinton posted a tweet that stated, in part: "Please don't make up attacks", Conway replied: "Bosnia lie a Great reminder", referring to how Clinton's mother Hillary Clinton falsely claimed to have landed in Bosnia "under sniper fire" during the Bosnian War.

Writing in The New York Times, A. C. Thompson mentioned the 2012 case of a man who the authorities suspected of trafficking in counterfeit goods. His home and his store in Bowling Green, Ohio, were raided, and 18 firearms were found in his possession. Federal authorities believed that he was planning on killing African Americans and Jews. The man, who the prosecutors called a white supremacist, pleaded guilty to weapons and counterfeit charges, but prosecutors failed to establish that he was a political terrorist.

The mayor of Bowling Green, Kentucky, issued a statement clarifying that "there was no massacre in Bowling Green", adding that he understood "how during a live interview one can misspeak and we appreciate the clarification".

Conway's statement was parodied in two segments of season 42 of Saturday Night Live. In the cold open for that season's episode 13, Alec Baldwin, playing the role of Donald Trump, said that in the Bowling Green massacre, "[s]o many people died, but really they're the lucky ones. They don't have to see how bad The Apprentice has gotten". In episode 14's cold open, Melissa McCarthy, playing the role of Sean Spicer, recited a list of terrorist incidents that "you [the news media] never even write about", referencing a list of 78 supposedly under-reported terrorist incidents that the White House had released earlier that week. McCarthy, as Spicer, said: "The Bowling Green massacre—not the Kellyanne one, the real one. The Horror in Six Flags. The Slaughter at Fraggle Rock. The Night They Drove Old Dixie Down. Okay?!"

The song "Bowling Green Massacre" by British singer-songwriter Josh O'Keefe is another example of a popular culture parody of this statement.

== See also ==
- Last Night in Sweden, a somewhat similar reference by Donald Trump
