= Celinda Lake =

American political strategist

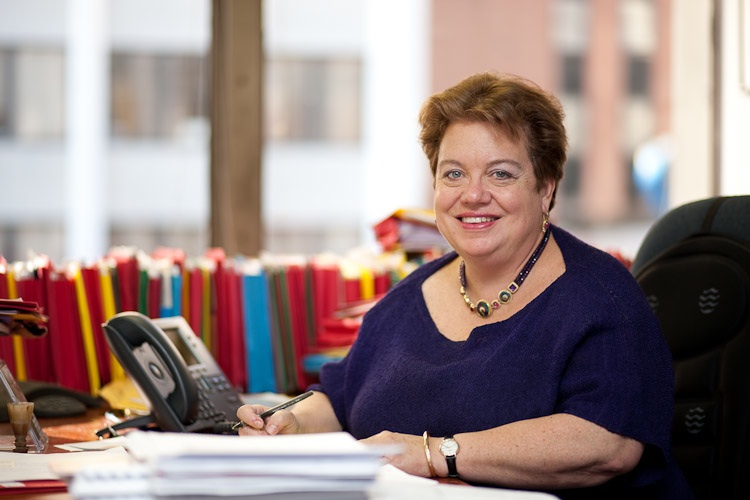
- Born: Montana, U.S.
- Education: Smith College (BA) University of Michigan (MA)
- Occupations: Pollster, political strategist
- Political party: Democratic

Celinda Lake is a pollster and political strategist for the Democratic Party in the United States of America.

== Background and education ==
A native of Montana, Lake was born and raised on a ranch. She earned her master's degree in political science and survey research from the University of Michigan, and also received a certificate in political science from the University of Geneva. She attended Smith College as an undergraduate. In 2002, Smith College awarded her its Distinguished Alumna Medal.

== Career ==
Lake and her firm, Lake Research Partners, work on healthcare, education and the environment. She has worked with a large variety of organizations, such as the AFL-CIO, SEIU, EMILY's List, The White House Project, Planned Parenthood, Democratic National Committee, Sierra Club, Human Rights Campaign, NARAL, Barbara Lee Family Foundation, Kaiser Family Foundation, VoteVets Action Fund, the Wikimedia Foundation, and more.

Lake has worked as a pollster for many prominent politicians. She has worked with Senator Barbara Mikulski, Senator Debbie Stabenow, Senator Blanche Lincoln, Senator Jon Tester, former Arizona Governor Janet Napolitano, former West Virginia Governor Bob Wise, Congressman Tim Walz, Houston mayor Annise Parker. She also served as a pollster to Massachusetts Attorney General Martha Coakley, whose loss she credited to "the failure of the White House and Congress to confront Wall Street." She also served as leader of focus group research for Bill Clinton's successful 1992 Presidential Campaign. Lake focuses especially on women candidates and women's concerns. She co-authored a book, What Women Really Want, with Republican pollster Kellyanne Conway.
