= A Limo for a Lame-O =

1980 commentary by Al Franken on Saturday Night Live

"A Limo for a Lame-O" is a commentary delivered by Al Franken during Weekend Update on the May 10, 1980, episode of Saturday Night Live (SNL). Using the framework of his own desire to have a limousine drive him to and from his job at NBC, the network which broadcasts the program, Franken attacked network president Fred Silverman for NBC's poor showing in the Nielsen ratings during his tenure. It has been called "one of the meanest acts of character assassination in the history of—well, in the history of mean acts of character assassination."

Silverman, who had not been informed of the commentary beforehand due to a series of communication failures, was furious. He believed that SNL producer Lorne Michaels, who was in the midst of negotiating a new contract, had orchestrated it as revenge for Silverman's failure to attend a meeting with Michaels to discuss those talks the previous day. After hundreds of letters and postcards were delivered to Silverman's office the following Monday, he refused to accept a letter of apology offered by Franken, whom he said later he had never liked to begin with.

The commentary, and Silverman's reaction to it, had several effects on the show. Michaels and many of the people associated with the show were emotionally exhausted after five seasons, and he had planned for almost everyone to take some time off. Since the show had been one of NBC's few successes under Silverman, the network wanted it to continue that fall. Franken and his writing partner Tom Davis, with Michaels' support, had expressed interest in producing the show while Michaels served as its executive producer. NBC executives were also hoping they could persuade Michaels to stay, an option he was still open to if the contractual provisions he wanted were offered.

After Franken's commentary, he and Davis lost any chance they had had of succeeding Michaels as producer. NBC also assumed Michaels was not interested in continuing and began making plans for a future SNL without him. This led to Jean Doumanian, one of the show's associate producers from its inception but never involved in the writing process, being hired to replace Michaels, a decision kept from him since he believed any new producer should have been involved in the writing aspect of the show. She oversaw a wholesale replacement of the cast and writing staff, and was fired before the end of the next season, called the worst in the show's history by author Brian Finamore.

== Background ==
In spring 1980, Michaels and Saturday Night Live on the one side, and Silverman and NBC on the other, were in drastically different positions.

=== Lorne Michaels and SNL ===
By its fifth season, SNL was an unqualified success. It had made stars of its cast members and spawned blockbuster movies, hit singles and many lines of merchandise. Three of those stars, Chevy Chase, Dan Aykroyd, and John Belushi, had left. But all the show's other repertory cast members remained, and midway through the season Harry Shearer was promoted from featured player status to replace them, although he soon alienated his colleagues with his attitude. Many of the show's writers, who had long been playing minor roles in sketches, including Al Franken and his longtime partner Tom Davis, were in turn named as featured players.

But behind the scenes many of the cast and crew had grown weary of the show. Their celebrity status led them to keep company with each other, and other celebrities who they had become friends with, so that they would not be mobbed as they often were in public by fans who asked them the same questions over and over. Increasing cocaine use, particularly the addictions of Garrett Morris and Laraine Newman, had exacerbated existing interpersonal friction, and stories of egotistical behavior by the stars began to reach the media. Producer Lorne Michaels had felt it necessary to bring the staff up to Mohonk Mountain House in the Hudson Valley for a weekend retreat before the season, the first time that had been necessary, which the senior cast members declined to attend. Competing network ABC had also started a competing sketch-comedy show called Fridays, putting further pressure on Michaels (who was incensed that it was produced by two other clients of his manager, Bernie Brillstein), the cast and crew.

Hanging over the show was the question of whether Michaels would renew his contract and continue the show for another season. Many of the cast and crew did not want him to. "Everyone was looking beyond the show," recalled writer Alan Zweibel. Critics complained that, in the absence of its two biggest stars, the show had become less creative, and Lorne joked to the media that that had been his intention all along. "[It's] going to get worse and worse, and eventually will never be funny again." By Christmas 1979, Michaels' assistant Cherie Fortis said, "everyone just said 'Okay, let's get through the rest of this.' People were praying Lorne wouldn't come back. We were waiting for it to end."

=== Fred Silverman and NBC ===
Michaels' return did not seem likely. From the beginning of his tenure at NBC, Silverman had been convinced that a weekday variety show starring Gilda Radner, whom he saw as the next Lucille Ball, could be a hit. Michaels was less certain. Radner told NBC executives she could not do two series at once and did not want to leave her SNL castmates behind. In November 1979, two weeks after Michaels—who had lost his most important ally at the network when Silverman's predecessor Herb Schlosser, an early supporter of SNL, left—stated his refusal clearly and definitely, Silverman called him to his office once again to try to persuade him to do it. The meeting ended in a shouting match, and Silverman's already somewhat negative view of Michaels became much more severe. Michaels and Radner's aversion to a weekly show, however, did not prevent them from mounting a one-woman Broadway show, later filmed as Gilda Live.

While SNL, despite its internal conflicts, was still successful, NBC was not. Shows like The Tonight Show (itself embroiled in a contract dispute with host Johnny Carson at the same time) were mainstays of the schedule along with SNL, but the network had had very few of the prime time hits it hoped president Fred Silverman, known until then for his apparently unerring instinct in understanding what audiences would watch, would be able to deliver for them as he had for ABC and CBS earlier in the decade. NBC's weak ratings position was aggravated in early 1980 by its shaky finances—a loss of millions in broadcast fees when President Jimmy Carter decided to boycott that year's Summer Olympics in Moscow in order to protest the Soviet invasion of Afghanistan the preceding fall, and the failure of Supertrain in spring of 1979, the most expensive series in television history at that point, had pushed the network to the verge of bankruptcy.

From the beginning of his tenure at NBC, John Belushi had played Silverman in a series of sketches. While Silverman himself was not fond of them, he knew better than to intervene in one of his network's few hits. He also said later that despite his antipathy, he recognized that Belushi was a talented performer and the impersonation got laughs.

In the spring of 1980, Michaels began renegotiating his contract. Believing that NBC would, as it had four years earlier, take over Studio 8H, where the show was staged, for coverage of that year's presidential elections, his hope was for a later start to the season, to give everyone a bit more time to rest. When it returned he wanted to totally restructure it, probably with a new cast, and would have filled the role of executive producer, since he had signed a three-picture deal with Warner Brothers, leaving the duties he had handled for the previous five seasons to someone else, possibly Franken and Davis. Most of the cast and crew had wanted to just end the show, but admitted that if Michaels had wanted to continue they would have done so with him. He also had some ideas for side projects, such as Yesterday, a half-hour version of Weekend Update that would air late on weekday nights (an idea soon abandoned when Johnny Carson, in his contract, effectively got the right to approve any show that came on after his; Carson had never been a great fan of SNL's style of humor).

== May 8 meeting ==
On May 8, 1980, Michaels and Brillstein had scheduled an afternoon meeting with Silverman and other network executives. Michaels had previously made clear to the network that he was amenable to staying, even at the same salary, as long as the network accommodated his request for a later start to the season, the restructuring of the show, and technical improvements to 8H. Rather than haggle with the network, he had told the executives to get back to him with the best counteroffer they could put together within 24 hours.

Silverman had been up all the previous night putting together the network's fall schedule so he could present it to the network affiliates' board of governors that morning. That meeting had not gone well; many of the affiliates were disappointed with NBC's performance under Silverman, and some of them were openly talking about changing their affiliation. Silverman skipped the afternoon meeting; Brillstein and Michaels were told only that he was ill, and felt disrespected.

That feeling of disrespect was further intensified by their interactions with the NBC executives who were at the meeting. Irwin Moss, the network's vice president for business affairs, began by noting the $2.5 million NBC had paid, sight unseen, for the broadcast rights to Gilda Live, which had failed commercially and critically. "So, you're here to gouge us again?" he joked. Brillstein did not think that was funny. Moss then pulled out a copy of Michaels' most recent contract, and asked him what he wanted.

Another shouting match, between Brillstein and Moss, ensued. Both Brillstein and Michaels were stunned by how poorly the executives had prepared themselves. They finally left after Moss refused to commit to any more than six episodes of a possible prime time series; Brillstein and Michaels had wanted 17. Afterwards, Michaels was convinced his relationship with NBC was, at this point in time, over. "They would have had to make me feel special [to come back], and they didn't," he recalled years later.

The next day, Silverman called and apologized for his absence, and rescheduled the meeting for the following Monday. He and Lorne met by themselves that afternoon. Silverman offered Michaels more money, primetime shows, anything he wanted, as long as he'd stay at least nominally involved with Saturday Night Live.

== Commentary ==
Franken's was not the first Weekend Update commentary that season to be a self-serving personal attack. In 1979, just before Christmas, Bill Murray, who had felt abandoned when Aykroyd and Belushi left, leaving the show overly reliant on him for the first half of the season, had used the critical and commercial failure of 1941, Belushi and Aykroyd's first post-SNL movie, to taunt them. Murray deliberately mispronounced the film's title, and pointedly overlooking the pair, he instead misidentified past SNL hosts Christopher Lee (who did have a role in 1941) and Carrie Fisher (who did not) as two of the film's three top-billed stars. "Carrie and Chris Lee have both been on Saturday Night Live, and if you ask me they should never have left," he said. "They wouldn't listen and now they have this Christmas turkey on their hands. And now my two old friends are going to have the most miserable Christmas of their lives." Murray ended his commentary by recommending audiences to go see Meatballs, his film debut from that summer.

Shortly before dress rehearsal on May 10 for the season's third-to-last show, hosted by Bob Newhart, Barbara Gallagher, NBC vice president for late-night and special programming, who had worked for Silverman at ABC as well, was perusing the scripts for that evening's show when she came across Franken's commentary for that night's Weekend Update, where he had increasingly been making appearances that season as the segment's "social sciences editor", riffing on the concept of the 1980s as the "Al Franken Decade" that he had introduced a few months earlier with the end of the 1970s "Me Decade". In this evening's installment, Franken recounted how, earlier in the week, he had just come up with a great idea for the show while hailing a taxi outside Rockefeller Center when a fan interrupted him, and he forgot it. This led him to wonder why he did not get limousine service from NBC, while Silverman did, since Franken was on a hit show while the network had done nothing but flounder under Silverman.

Knowing how bad the last two days had been for her boss, Gallagher groaned, knowing Silverman would not take this well. After dress, where the commentary drew voluminous laughter from the audience, she went to Michaels, who agreed that it might have been too much (he had not thought it funny when Franken read it to him, but allowed it since it only took up two minutes of airtime). He refused to remove it from the show since that was not how he ran things, and suggested she talk to Franken personally. "Fred's in a bad way," she told him, "and this is really going to hurt him." She claimed later that Franken responded "Good, because he hurt Lorne."

Michaels assured Gallagher and Brandon Tartikoff, NBC vice president for comedy programming, who was also present, that Franken would nevertheless comply with her request and tone the commentary down. Lorne suggested that they still might want to warn Silverman that the attack was coming, as the show had done in past seasons with the Belushi sketches. But whereas in those situations one of Michaels' assistants had called one of Silverman's, on a Saturday night the only way to warn Silverman would have been to call him at his own home and speak to him personally, which neither of them did. Michaels believed that both Gallagher and Tartikoff were afraid to talk to Silverman, who as the pressures on him increased with NBC's failures had been screaming at his subordinates more and more frequently.

When the segment actually aired, it was apparent that Franken had responded to Gallagher's plea by making the criticism of Silverman even harsher. Beginning as he had by moving from the "Al Franken Decade" to his travails while hailing the cab, he then moved to noting who else at NBC got their own limousines—other members of the show's cast and stars of other shows like Gary Coleman and Tom Snyder. He felt criticizing anyone in the first group would be "petty" and "taste aside", he understood the latter two.

But now, get this—you know who gets complete door-to-door limousine service from NBC? Fred Silverman. Now, here's a guy ... who is a total, unequivocal failure. Okay? The guy's been here two years ... and he hasn't done diddly-squat. Okay? And he gets a limo! Now, here's a list ... [pulls out a chart] okay, of the top ten rated shows this season in TV. Now, there's some As there ... some Bs ... some Cs ... uh... some Ss. You see those? You see any Ns? Not one N! [puts the chart down] Why? 'Cause Silverman is a lame-o! But he still gets limousine service. I like to call it "A Limo for the Lame-O."

Franken went on to ask the audience to mail in postcards to Silverman's office asking that he "Get Al Franken A Limo". "If enough of you write, Silverman will have to give me the limo." he continued. "Even though I've just decimated him, that's the way things are around here. He's timid, indecisive, and easily pressured! He's weak!" The address flashed on the screen once again. Franken signed off, and Jane Curtin ended the segment, sending the show to a commercial.

== Aftermath ==
The commentary drew as many laughs as it had in dress rehearsal. It had barely ended when, Warren Littlefield later recalled, an NBC page came up to Tartikoff and told him he had a phone call. "Who is it?" the executive asked. "A screaming Mr. Silverman" responded the page. Tartikoff asked the page if he had told Silverman whether he knew where Tartikoff was. "No," the page answered, "we were just told to find you." Tartikoff then told the page to say that he could not be found. "He just couldn't take Fred screaming at him at that hour," Littlefield recalled. "We always thought that was a wonderful lesson that Brandon was imparting to us about survival in the executive ranks."

Silverman thought that Michaels had deliberately allowed Franken's attack on him to air as retaliation for the missed Thursday meeting. Reflecting on the episode later, Michaels said that this allegation was difficult to respond to: "What are you going to say—that it wasn't me? Then he'd think I'm such a wuss that I allow Al Franken to just steamroll me against my own better career instincts." But he agreed too much damage had been done to easily undo. "The upshot of it all was that Fred took it personally, and that put a further strain between him and me, and we never did meet."

"I don't think Lorne put the sketch in there to be mean," Silverman said, also with years of reflection. "He never did a sketch to be mean. That was not his style. I never blamed Lorne personally."

Instead of the meeting the two had originally planned, the event of Monday in Silverman's office was the arrival of approximately 5,000 letters and postcards in response to Franken's plea. This further infuriated the executive, and it was suggested that Franken apologize, which he did by internal memorandum. "I did not intend to hurt or offend you with this, admittedly, frontal attack."

Instead, Franken urged Silverman to see how he had intended the piece, characterizing it as "brazen small guy attacks the boss." He asked that Silverman "step back and think of the Fred Silverman I talked about as 'the boss' instead of as Fred Silverman, your mother's son, your wife's husband, and your children's father." He believed it actually made NBC and Silverman look good as "even the most pointed criticism was allowed on the air by the network and by you, the boss." Franken further implored Silverman not to blame Lorne, who often allowed material on the show that he himself did not personally see the humor of in the name of creative freedom.

Silverman was unmoved. "I never liked Al Franken to begin with", he admitted later. "I thought this piece [he] did was just very mean-spirited and not very funny." He recalled writing back to Franken, saying "in no uncertain terms that I thought he was way off base and that I wasn't going to forget it."

== June 2 meeting ==
Tartikoff told Michaels afterwards that Franken had lost any chance of succeeding him. But he continued to hold out the hope that Michaels himself might yet be persuaded to return in some capacity, as he had suggested he might. The season finale, two weeks later, did little to foster those hopes. While host Buck Henry, doing that duty for what turned out to be the last time, emphatically denied (to loud applause) that the show was ending and even paraded a purported "new cast" (actually longtime backstage crewmembers) across the stage during his opening monologue, the end sent a different message, as the "On Air" sign outside the studio, the show's traditional final shot, flickered and then darkened. Michaels had also left all the cast members a gift, a cigarette lighter shaped like the 30 Rock building where the show was produced, inscribed "Nice working with you/1975–1980". He had never done that in previous seasons.

Whatever message Michaels was sending, the network very much wanted the show to continue. Tartikoff and Gallagher met with Michaels for the last time at the beginning of June. All the producer would promise was that "even if I don't come back, I'll do my very best to make sure the show doesn't fall apart." They assumed that meant he had no one in mind beyond Franken and Davis, both now off the list, to succeed him that he would recommend.

However, he had also made it known that he felt any replacement producer had to be a writer, because he believed that in comedy it took a writer, particularly one with credits, to be able to tell other writers with large egos what was and wasn't funny. Silverman, for his part, had also told his executives that a new producer for SNL had to come from within the group of people already working for the show, as he did not believe an outsider would have credibility with the people Michaels had hired and nurtured. So, during the meeting, it was suggested that longtime associate producer Jean Doumanian, a good friend of Gallagher's, be promoted to the top job.

Michaels immediately rejected the idea. Pressed by Gallagher, he explained that Doumanian wasn't a producer, that she had never been part of the show's "core team", and that nobody who ever had been would work for her. He had also invited her to come work for him if he landed a deal with Paramount Pictures he had been considering. He reminded the two executives that she had never been present for any last-minute meetings held between dress and air.

Al Franken in particular disliked Doumanian. She had ostensibly produced a primetime special with Bob and Ray, whose humor was especially adored by many of the SNL writers and performers, earlier that season. On the basis of a small contribution to one sketch, Doumanian had decided to award herself a writer's credit. Franken had seen it and crossed her name out, assuming it was a mistake. She later reinserted it, and when Franken came to her over the apparent mistake, she insisted on taking it.

== Hiring of Jean Doumanian ==
Tartikoff decided there was no chance of persuading Michaels to return. After the meeting, Tartikoff called Allan Katz, a former Laugh-In writer who'd gone on to write and produce for several successful 1970s sitcoms, including M*A*S*H and Rhoda, to see if he was interested. The following day, Katz declined, saying he did not want to make the necessary changes to his lifestyle.

Without any other candidates of his own, Tartikoff turned again to Gallagher. She again made the case for her friend Doumanian. Whatever Michaels had said, she told Tartikoff, Doumanian was indeed an important member of the SNL team—as one of the show's associate producers she knew how the show was put together and run, and she knew enough of the other people to provide the continuity Silverman wanted. The previous year, she had produced a special with Bob and Ray, of whom many of the SNL creative team were fans, that came in under budget, (Note: Hill and Weingrad, in their chapter 34, point out that Doumanian's having produced that special did not demonstrate the full skill set Michaels drew upon in producing Saturday Night Live. She had the show's existing writers and production staff at her disposal and did not need to hire anyone; the format was also the same as SNL and the show aired in the same timeslot. "That's not producing a show," they quote one of the SNL production staff as saying, "that's booking a show." She also received some help from Lorne, who increased the show's budget to compensate for some of her attempts to keep it in the original budget after they caused friction between her and some of the staff; he also helped her reformat the special between dress and air.) Gallagher noted. Lastly, since it was likely all or most of the cast would be new, the new producer would need to be good at evaluating new talent—which, she said, Doumanian had been doing already as the show's talent coordinator. (Note: Hill and Weingrad also pointed out this job title was misleading. Doumanian had not had any role in assessing or hiring performers or writers; she was the show's "talent coordinator" in that she took care of the hospitality needs for guest performers, a task it was uniformly acknowledged she had performed extremely well.)

"Limo for a Lame-O" maybe had implications for what happened that next year, because I think it ruptured the relationship between Silverman and Lorne. Fred knew Lorne was leaving, but instead of going to Lorne and asking him who would be a good successor, Fred relied, I think, on Barbara Gallagher, who was a friend of Jean Doumanian's. So it sort of led to Jean's selection.

– Al Franken

Tartikoff scheduled a meeting with Doumanian, who had already accepted a job in East Coast production with Paramount, for June 4, two days after the meeting with Michaels. He found her very organized, and very specific about what steps she would take with the show. It was his decision to hire her or not, and he told Gallagher he would. The next day he let Doumanian know the job was hers, but not to tell Michaels yet.

Why he told her to remain silent has been a matter of some debate. "[T]hey didn't want anyone to know yet, and if Lorne knew, it would have been all over the town," Gallagher said later. "So that was the reason for not telling him. It wasn't a conspiracy to do anything to Lorne." She also has said that she didn't think Tartikoff, who like herself was under enough emotional stress dealing with Silverman's tirades, had it in him at the time for a similarly angry confrontation with Michaels, who for his part believes that the secrecy suggested that Tartikoff hadn't truly given up on persuading him to return, since that way he could easily have retracted the offer.

Michaels learned that Doumanian had been hired to replace him the next day. He had been in Houston at the premiere of Urban Cowboy when Paramount head Barry Diller told him that Doumanian had informed Paramount she would not be able to take the job with the studio since she would be succeeding Michaels as producer of SNL. Very soon afterwards Tartikoff called Michaels himself and confirmed this.

"Really", Michaels told him. "That's an interesting choice." He told Tartikoff the network had "broken faith" with him and that it would regret the decision to replace him with Doumanian, since it would mean a "complete break" with the old show. Doumanian herself called and apologized, and only then did Michaels learn about the secrecy. "That was the very first moment of my growing up," he recalled later, suggesting the talks between her and the network had been going on at the same time he had been imploring her to come to Paramount with him. He was furious at her for what he felt was a betrayal, and the two have reportedly never spoken since.

Two weeks later, Michaels signed a one-year "holding agreement" with NBC, which served mainly to prevent him from going to work for another network so soon, while he started his own production company, Broadway Video. In addition to some nominal development commitments, he had the opportunity to produce a special one-hour Weekend Update for the Saturday before the election. Many of the original writers and performers, including Dan Aykroyd, returned. It was never aired, however, when last-minute schedule changes due to a final presidential debate that week led to Silverman pre-empting it for another special.

== Departure of writing staff ==
Doumanian had expected to be recasting the show, but to at least keep some of the writers. However, shortly after she took over, all the writers quit. Narratives differ on whether this was on their initiative or Doumanian's. "I did want to keep several writers, but I think everybody was advised not to stay on," she recalled. "Everybody who said they would stay reneged once word got out."

But according to Michaels, "Jean didn't want them." He believes she especially had it in for the writers, and Franken and Davis and Jim Downey, whom Michaels had wanted to succeed him, in particular. "Everyone got a memo from Jean to clear out their offices by July," he claims, likening her to "the new broom" which, in a common media adage about management changes, "sweeps clean". "For guys like Franken and that, it was the first sign that they weren't even being considered to stay." So thoroughly did they clean their offices out that, according to Joe Piscopo, one of the new cast members Doumanian hired later, not even a pencil was left.

== SNL season 6 ==
Doumanian had to hire an entirely new cast and writing staff in just ten weeks. She also had to cope with the network cutting the show's budget to a third of what it had been the previous season. "Any producer who comes in here now is doomed to fail," Gallagher recalls telling her friend. "It's not going to work."

The show under Doumanian, called Saturday Night Live '80, was indeed seen as a failure. Although she claimed to have understood the writing process due to her participation in meetings on the subject, as Michaels had warned the network, she had a particularly difficult time managing the writers due to her inexperience in that area. When it premiered, the reviews were unforgiving and the ratings began to decline, turning what had been a rare success for NBC into yet another problem area for executives.

The season was not a total loss. Joe Piscopo's characters drew genuine laughter from the audience, and over the course of the season Eddie Murphy, whom Doumanian had been persuaded to give a chance despite reservations about his youth, began to emerge as a star. But in February Charles Rocket, whom she had expected to emerge as the show's star, used the word fuck on air while the cast was trying to fill time at the end of a show. Two weeks later, when Bill Murray became the first member of the old cast to host the new version of the show, the show's cold opening had him giving the cast a pep talk, but ended with him apologizing to his former castmates on camera. Doumanian was fired and replaced with Dick Ebersol, who was able to produce just one show before that year's writers' strike forced an early end to the TV season. SNL's sixth season, mostly produced by Jean Doumanian, is remembered as the series' worst.

While that season finale had no official host, it had begun with Chevy Chase reflecting on the old days with Mr. Bill. He also returned to read the news on Weekend Update. To great applause, at the end he introduced Franken, who had himself returned to the show for the first time since the previous season ended, for another commentary on the "Al Franken Decade."

Franken used the concept as a lead-in for a discussion of the show's turbulent preceding year, telling the audience how NBC had chosen Doumanian, instead of someone who knew what they were doing "like me, Al Franken", without consulting Michaels or anyone else on the show's staff. It then took the network 12 episodes to realize that "no English-speaking person" could have been a worse pick. But Franken did not have a much better opinion of Ebersol, who had been in charge of late-night programming for NBC when SNL had been launched in 1975, and thus became "the first person to steal credit for the success of Saturday Night Live." He recited a list of failed comedies like The Waverly Wonders that Ebersol had been responsible for, and told the audience that the show would improve, but not much.

Instead, Franken suggested, it was time to end the show and its "tired old format" altogether. He called on the audience once again to send in postcards, this time urging NBC to "Put SNL To Sleep". However, after he concluded, Chase reminded him that he and Davis were supposed to host the next episode, and he urged the audience to watch next week, "but not after that".

== See also ==
- 1980 in American television
- History of Saturday Night Live
