= Teddy Ebersol Field =

Series of fields along the Charles River in the city of Boston

Coordinates: 42.3637°N 71.0719°W

Teddy Ebersol's Red Sox Fields at Lederman Park is a series of fields along the Charles River in the city of Boston. The Boston Red Sox foundation and the Esplanade Association in conjunction with the Hill House, an NPO, helped fund the 1.8 million-dollar renewal project. The field reopened on September 5, 2006, to the Hill House youth soccer program.

The land includes two baseball/softball diamonds, a youth baseball diamond, a T-ball diamond, or up to five youth soccer fields, or a regulation-sized soccer field in a design that accommodates a variety of other athletic and community uses. Before the renovations, the fields were uneven and often flooded.

The fields are named after a young Red Sox fan, Teddy Ebersol, who died in a plane crash on November 28, 2004, in Colorado. Teddy was the son of NBC Sports head Dick Ebersol and Kate & Allie actress Susan Saint James.

== Controversy ==
As of mid-2008, the permitting process was guided by an eight-person advisory committee, with all weekday field use (7 a.m. to 3 p.m.) permitted to Hill House, a Beacon Hill community group. Utilization of the field was low. In 2009, a large metal fence was constructed around the entire park, further preventing casual use. The fence was opposed by community groups including the Esplanade Association, but was requested by private donors and installed by the Department of Conservation and Recreation (DCR).
