= Saturday Night Live season 30 =

Saturday Night Live
- Season 30
- No. of episodes: 20

Release
- Original network: NBC
- Original release: October 2, 2004 – May 21, 2005

Season chronology
- ← Previous season 29 Next → season 31

The thirtieth season of Saturday Night Live, an American sketch comedy series, originally aired in the United States on NBC between October 2, 2004, and May 21, 2005.

== History ==
This season was notable for a lip-syncing gaffe by Ashlee Simpson during her second performance (on the episode hosted by Jude Law). This season was also home to many sketches focused on the 2004 U.S. Presidential election.

== Cast ==
Before the start of this season, longtime cast member Jimmy Fallon left the show after six seasons with the cast since 1998. In the wake of Fallon's departure, Fred Armisen was promoted to repertory status, while Finesse Mitchell and Kenan Thompson remained featured players.

New cast members this season included Rob Riggle, an improv comedian (at the Upright Citizens Brigade Theater) and U.S. Marine (making him the first and, as of 2025, only SNL cast member to serve in the Marines). This would also be Riggle's only season on the show. In addition, SNL writer Jason Sudeikis (who appeared in many bit roles before joining the cast) joined the cast as a featured player for the last three episodes of the season.

With Fallon gone, Amy Poehler became Tina Fey's co-anchor on Weekend Update, making Fey and Poehler the first and, through at least season 50, only two-woman anchor team.

=== Cast roster ===
**Repertory players**

- Fred Armisen
- Rachel Dratch
- **Tina Fey**
- Will Forte
- Darrell Hammond
- Seth Meyers
- Chris Parnell
- **Amy Poehler**
- Maya Rudolph
- Horatio Sanz

**Featured players**

- Finesse Mitchell
- Rob Riggle
- Jason Sudeikis (first episode: May 7, 2005)
- Kenan Thompson

bold denotes "Weekend Update" anchor

== Writers ==
At the start of the season, longtime writer Harper Steele (who had been a writer since 1995) was named as the co-head writer alongside Tina Fey.

Weekend Update writer Alex Baze is added to the writing staff this season.

Near the end of the season, writer Jason Sudeikis left the writing staff to join the cast.

This was initially the final season for longtime writer/writing supervisor Paula Pell (who had been a writer for 10 years since 1995), as she left to work on her sitcom Thick and Thin. However, that sitcom never aired so Pell (who had also been a writing supervisor for eight years since 1997) returned to the show early in the next season. T. Sean Shannon (the other writing supervisor) was removed from his role, but remained as a writer the next season.

Longtime writer Jim Downey did not write for the next season, but would return for season 32.

== Episodes ==
| No. overall | No. in season | Host | Musical guest(s) | Original release date |
|---|---|---|---|---|
| 566 | 1 | Ben Affleck | Nelly | October 2, 2004 |
Nelly performs "My Place" and "Na-NaNa-Na" with Jaheim.; Don Pardo accidentally introduces Will Forte as "Will Ferrell" in the opening credits.; Alec Baldwin appears in the opening monologue.; James Gandolfini appears as an unidentified New Jersey resident on Weekend Update.; Amy Poehler's first episode as Weekend Update co-anchor.; Rob Riggle's first episode as a cast member.
| 567 | 2 | Queen Latifah | Queen Latifah | October 9, 2004 |
Queen Latifah performs "The Same Love That Made Me Laugh" and "Hard Times".; Horatio Sanz introduces Latifah's first performance.; Chris Kattan introduces Latifah's second performance.; The episode features a tribute to Rodney Dangerfield, who had died earlier in the week.
| 568 | 3 | Jude Law | Ashlee Simpson | October 23, 2004 |
Ashlee Simpson performs her hit single "Pieces of Me" without incident. When she comes back a second time to perform "Autobiography", her band starts to play, and the first lines of her singing "Pieces of Me" can be heard again. She holds the microphone at her waist at the time. Simpson looks momentarily confused as the band plows ahead with the song and the vocal is quickly silenced. A flustered Simpson makes some exaggerated hopping dance moves before walking off the stage in embarrassment. After a few moments showing the band playing without their singer, the director cuts to a commercial. Following her performance and negative publicity, Simpson claimed it was simply a back-up track due to an attack of her acid reflux. Simpson also appears in the opening monologue.
| 569 | 4 | Kate Winslet | Eminem | October 30, 2004 |
Eminem performs "Mosh" and "Just Lose It" with Proof; Johnny Damon appears on Weekend Update.
| 570 | 5 | Liam Neeson | Modest Mouse | November 13, 2004 |
Modest Mouse performs "Float On" and "Ocean Breathes Salty".; JB Smoove appears in "The Night Before Star Jones’ Wedding" sketch.
| 571 | 6 | Luke Wilson | U2 | November 20, 2004 |
U2 performs "Vertigo" and "Sometimes You Can't Make It on Your Own". The band also performs "I Will Follow" over the closing credits, as well as "All Because of You" for the audience as the show ends. Bono began their first song by speaking into his microphone "Live mic, live mic" in reference to the Ashlee Simpson lip-synching controversy a few episodes earlier.
| 572 | 7 | Colin Farrell | Scissor Sisters | December 11, 2004 |
Scissor Sisters perform "Take Your Mama" and "Comfortably Numb".; Lindsay Lohan appears in the monologue and on Weekend Update.; Brett Hull appears on Weekend Update.
| 573 | 8 | Robert De Niro | Destiny's Child | December 18, 2004 |
Destiny's Child performs "Soldier" with Lil Wayne and "Cater 2 U".; The Muppets appear in the opening monologue and the "Christmas is Number One" sketch.
| 574 | 9 | Topher Grace | The Killers | January 15, 2005 |
The Killers perform "Somebody Told Me" and "Mr. Brightside".; Jennifer Garner was originally selected to host the show but had to drop out due to a back injury from filming Elektra.; Bill Hader can be seen behind the audience in the opening monologue (a season before he joined the cast) after Lorne Michaels invited him to watch the show during his audition process. Writers Jason Sudeikis and J. B. Smoove appear in the monologue playing audience members asking questions. Sudeikis would join the cast as a featured player eight episodes later.
| 575 | 10 | Paul Giamatti | Ludacris featuring Sum 41 | January 22, 2005 |
Ludacris performs "Get Back" with Sum 41; and "Number One Spot".
| 576 | 11 | Paris Hilton | Keane | February 5, 2005 |
Keane performs "Somewhere Only We Know" and "Everybody's Changing".
| 577 | 12 | Jason Bateman | Kelly Clarkson | February 12, 2005 |
Kelly Clarkson performs "Since U Been Gone" and "Breakaway". Additionally, Clarkson appears in the "Subway Performers" and "Rap Night" sketches.
| 578 | 13 | Hilary Swank | 50 Cent | February 19, 2005 |
50 Cent performs "Candy Shop" with Olivia and "Disco Inferno" with Tony Yayo.
| 579 | 14 | David Spade | Jack Johnson | March 12, 2005 |
Jack Johnson performs "Sitting, Waiting, Wishing" and "Mudfootball" with G. Love.
| 580 | 15 | Ashton Kutcher | Gwen Stefani | March 19, 2005 |
Gwen Stefani performs "Rich Girl" with Eve; and "Hollaback Girl".; Demi Moore, Kutcher's then-fiancée, appears in the opening monologue.
| 581 | 16 | Cameron Diaz | Green Day | April 9, 2005 |
Green Day performs "Boulevard of Broken Dreams" and "Holiday".; Drew Barrymore, Jimmy Fallon and Justin Timberlake (the latter Diaz's then-boyfriend) appear in The Barry Gibb Talk Show sketch. Fallon also appears on Weekend Update.
| 582 | 17 | Tom Brady | Beck | April 16, 2005 |
Beck performs "E-Pro" and "Girl".; Martin Short appears as Jiminy Glick on Weekend Update.
| 583 | 18 | Johnny Knoxville | System of a Down | May 7, 2005 |
System of a Down performs "B.Y.O.B." and "Aerials".; Paula Abdul appears in the cold open and introduces System of a Down's second performance.; Patti Forte, Will Forte's mother, appears on Weekend Update.; Jason Sudeikis' first episode as a cast member.
| 584 | 19 | Will Ferrell | Queens of the Stone Age | May 14, 2005 |
Queens of the Stone Age performs "Little Sister" and "In My Head," with Ferrell accompanying them on a cowbell as his "More Cowbell" character Gene Frenkle.
| 585 | 20 | Lindsay Lohan | Coldplay | May 21, 2005 |
Coldplay performs "Speed of Sound" and "Fix You".; Rob Riggle's final episode as a cast member.; It would later be revealed that Lohan had such a serious drug addiction at the time that the typical post-performance party for the cast and crew was instead an impromptu intervention from them where they immediately huddled Lohan backstage, confronted her about it and urged her to go to rehab.

== Specials ==
| Title | Original release date |
|---|---|
| "The Best of Cheri Oteri" | September 4, 2004 |
Sketches include: "Spartan Cheerleaders", "Nadeen at the Burger Castle", "The Zimmermans", "20/20", "The View", "Monica's Interviewers", "Collete at the Pharmacy", "Morning Latte", "Judge Judy", "Rita Snowed In", "The Office Flirt", "Halloween in New Hampshire", "Rita on Halloween", "Old French Whore!", "Puff & Jennifer in Therapy", "Who Wants to Be a Millionaire", "Always & Forever", "Athena in the Cockpit", "Leg Up", and some Weekend Update clips.
| "The Best of Jon Lovitz" | September 25, 2004 |
Sketches include: "Tommy Flanagan," "The Peoples' Court," "Portrait of the Artist," "The Night Hanukkah Harry Saved Christmas," "Dunkin' Donuts Commercial," "Plug Away," "Johnny's Finished," "Girl Watchers on 49th Street," "ABC Campaign '88," "The Five Beatles," "Wimbledon Loss," "A Betty Ford Straight Arrow Christmas," "The Tonight Show," "Tales of Ribaldry," "Chick Hazzard, Private Investigator," and some Weekend Update clips.
| "The Best of Jimmy Fallon" | October 16, 2004 |
Sketches include: "Mick & Mick," "Celebrity Jeopardy," "Jarret's Room", "The Barry Gibb Show," "Donnie's Party," "Cork Soakers," "2001 Season's Greetings From SNL," "Summer Nights," clips of Fallon's most memorable celebrity impersonations and Weekend Update moments.
| "Presidential Bash 2004: The Great Debates" | November 1, 2004 |
This special featured some of SNL's mock presidential debates. Darrell Hammond hosted the special while impersonating Bill Clinton. Sketches include: "Debate '76," "Presidential Debate '88," "The First Presidential Debate," "The Second Presidential Debate," "Debate '92," "Perot and Stockdale Car Trip," "The Presidential Odd Couple," "First Presidential Debate 2004," and "Second Presidential Debate".
| "The Best of Tom Hanks" | November 6, 2004 |
Sketches include: "Steve's Fantasy," "The Stand-Ups," "Girl Watchers on 49th Street," "Calgary 1988," "Mr. Short-Term Memory," "Jew, Not a Jew," "Wayne's World Meets Aerosmith," "Tales of Ribaldry," "Sabra Price Is Right" and "Wilson the Volleyball with Tom Hanks".
| "Live from New York: The First 5 Years of Saturday Night Live" | February 20, 2005 |
Topics discussed include the creation of the show, the cast coming together, NBC fighting with Lorne over the show's creation, the first few episodes, the show's rise to popularity, Chevy Chase leaving the show, the disastrous Mardi Gras special, Bill Murray joining the show, several backstage fights and feuds, the creation of Weekend Update, the first crop of recurring sketches and characters, the hosts who appeared on the show, how the show struggled in its fifth season with the departure of Dan Aykroyd and John Belushi, and the end of the "Not Ready for Primetime" era after the last episode of season five. Dan Aykroyd, Chevy Chase, Tom Davis, James Downey, Al Franken, Elliott Gould, Buck Henry, Eric Idle, Penny Marshall, Steve Martin, Lorne Michaels, Garrett Morris, Laraine Newman, Don Pardo, Tom Schiller, Rosie Shuster, Paul Shaffer, Lily Tomlin and Alan Zweibel gave insight in the special.
| "The Best of Alec Baldwin" | May 28, 2005 |
Sketches include: "Greenhilly," "French Class," "Soap Opera Digest," the infamous "Canteen Boy Goes Camping," "Buckwell's Follies," "Delicious Dish," "Brasky's Buddies at the Bar," "Inside the Actors Studio," "Gay Voicemail," "The Tony Bennett Show," "Zinger vs. Burns," and "Prince Charles' Secretary".
