= Strategery =

American coined political word

The word "strategery" (/strəˈtiːdʒəri/ strə-TEE-jər-ee) was used in a Saturday Night Live sketch, written by James Downey, airing October 7, 2000, which satirized the performances of George W. Bush and Al Gore, two candidates for President of the United States, during the first presidential debate for election year 2000. Bush, played by comedian Will Ferrell, when asked by a mock debate moderator to "sum up, in a single word, the best argument for his candidacy", replied "strategery" (a mock-Bushism playing on the word "strategy"), satirizing Bush's reputation for mispronouncing words. SNL later released the episode as part of a video tape titled Presidential Bash 2000.

== Becoming a Bush catchphrase ==
After the 2000 presidential election, people inside the Bush White House reportedly began using the term as a joke, but it later became a term of art meaning the oversight of any activity by Bush's political consultants. Bush's strategists also came to be known within the White House as "The Department of Strategery", or the "Strategery Group".

Affectionately embracing satirical portrayals has been a Bush tactic at other times as well, such as when he presented a self-parodying slide show at the May 2004 Radio and Television Correspondents Dinner about looking for weapons of mass destruction in the Oval Office after the political comic strip Doonesbury satirically portrayed him on a similar comical search.

The term became widely used in comic and popular discourse across the political spectrum. Rush Limbaugh picked up the usage soon after the SNL airing. A trial exhibit from the 2007 "Scooter" Libby trial included the term, in Libby's daily schedule for June 10, 2003, which showed that Libby had a 6:00 pm "Strategery Meeting" scheduled to last 90 minutes. In a 2017 interview on Jimmy Kimmel Live!, Bush recalled a joke argument with SNL's Lorne Michaels about whether an SNL writer or Bush himself had actually coined the term.

== Other uses ==
Sarah Palin used the term in a 2010 interview with Bill O'Reilly on his television show, The O'Reilly Factor. Speaking of Charles Krauthammer and his political contacts, Palin commented "they're meeting people and they're doing their strategery".

The term is also a centerpiece of the fictitious firm Strategery Capital Management, LLC, a satirical website, which mocks the Treasury's $700 billion "Troubled Asset Rescue Plan" (which itself is a spoof of the real-world Troubled Asset Relief Program, which Bush signed into law in 2008).

A White House reporter, during a September 29, 2009, press briefing, began a question for press secretary Robert Gibbs with "From the standpoint of leverage or strategery..." The question, about Iran, drew laughs and a quip from Gibbs.

Shepard Smith, on his evening news program The FOX Report with Shepard Smith on July 10, 2012, described London officials' quoted "overall strategery" in placing anti-aircraft missiles on apartment buildings during the London Olympics.

The official podcast of the George W. Bush Presidential Center in Dallas is called The Strategerist.

== See also ==
- Bushism
- U.S. Presidents IQ hoax
- History of Saturday Night Live
