= Molly Solomon =

American television executive

Molly Solomon is an American television sports executive and the first woman to run a national sports network. Andrew Marchand of the New York Times (The Athletic) described her as "the most successful female sports executive in the history of television". Solomon is known for modernizing Olympic broadcasting for the digital age—expanding hours of coverage, embracing streaming platforms, and experimenting with new formats and personalities.

== Early life and education ==
Solomon graduated from Georgetown University’s School of Foreign Service in 1990. Shortly after graduating, she joined NBC in 1990 and was hired as one of two Olympic researchers for NBC’s coverage of the 1992 Barcelona Games, working closely with host Bob Costas.

Solomon became a production associate for NBC Sports in fall 1992. In 1996 she was hired as coordinating producer for NBC’s Olympics on cable. She served as coordinating producer for cable coverage at the 2000 Sydney and 2004 Athens Games.

In 2005, Dick Ebersol described Solomon as “one of those rare human beings who’s respected and admired by everyone”. Solomon would later attribute her career success to Ebersol's mentorship.

In 2012, Solomon was named executive producer of Golf Channel, becoming the first woman to serve as executive producer for a national sports network. Solomon guided Golf Channel’s coverage of golf’s return to the Olympic Games at Rio 2016. She remained at Golf Channel until 2023.

In November 2019, Solomon was named NBC's executive producer and president for Olympics and Paralympics. She faced novel challenges in Tokyo 2020 (held in 2021) including public health concerns, empty venues, and two Olympics in six months. Solomon has described producing the Olympics, coordinating a core team of roughly 40 people that scaled up to more than 3,000 as the Games began. Her teams worked across multiple networks and digital platforms to produce 7,000 hours of content spanning NBC, Telemundo, cable channels, and streaming services.

At the Paris 2024 Olympics, NBC Universal’s coverage drew more than 30 million viewers per day and earned critical praise for its innovative use of cross-platform content, including Peacock’s “Gold Zone” whip-around show and high-profile celebrity contributors such as Snoop Dogg. The production went on to lead the 46th Sports Emmy Awards with 10 wins, including Outstanding Live Special – Championship Event.

Solomon was at the helm for the NBC's coverage of the 2026 Winter Olympics in Milan Cortina. NBC Universal's coverage averaged 23.5 million viewers via NBC, Peacock, NBCUniversal's digital platforms and Versant's USA Network and CNBC. It was the best performance since the Sochi Games in 2014 and was up 96% from the Beijing Winter Games in 2022.

== Awards ==
2008 Woman of the Year, Women in Sports and Events (WISE)

2021 Adweek Most Powerful Women in Sports in 2021

2021 Lifetime Achievement Award, New York Festivals

2024 Gracie Award, American Women in Radio & Television
