= Jim Downey (comedian) =

American comedy writer and producer (born 1952)

- Downey in 2026
- Born: James Woodward Downey; 1952 (age 73–74); Berkeley, California, U.S.
- Education: Harvard University
- Occupations: Comedy writer; producer; actor; comedian
- Writing career
- Period: 1976–present
- Genre: Comedy
- Subjects: Satire; political humor

James Woodward Downey (born 1952) is an American comedy writer, producer, actor and comedian. Downey wrote for over 30 seasons of Saturday Night Live, making him the longest tenured writer in the show's history.

== Early life and education ==
Downey was born in Berkeley, California, and grew up in Joliet, Illinois. After graduating from Joliet Catholic High School, he entered Harvard University, where he wrote for the Harvard Lampoon and later became its president. As a Lampoon writer, Downey created a Cosmo parody featuring a fictitious nude photo of Henry Kissinger on the front cover and invited John Wayne to the campus. He graduated from Harvard in 1974 with a degree in Russian. After graduating, Downey received a one-year fellowship to eastern Europe, for which he turned down an invitation by Michael O'Donoghue to be part of the first season of SNL.

Downey is not related to SNL alumnus Robert Downey Jr., whose uncle James B. Downey has been confused with Jim Downey in the past.

== Writing career ==
=== Saturday Night Live ===
In 1976, Downey joined the Saturday Night Live writing staff as its youngest member. He was among the first Harvard Lampoon writers to write for television, at a time when, in the opinion of writer Steve O'Donnell, "the sensibilities of the Lampoon [were] a little closer to the sensibilities of the mass media." Simpsons writer Mike Reiss called Downey "patient zero" of Lampoon comedy writers.

Downey ultimately worked on 27 of the show's first 32 seasons, one of the longest tenures in the show's history. He arrived at Saturday Night Live the same week as Bill Murray with whom he ended up sharing an office overlooking 50th Street, but he mostly began writing at SNL with Al Franken, Tom Davis, and Dan Aykroyd. His first stretch as writer for the show ran from 1976 to 1980, culminating in a brief stint as a featured cast member. By the 1979–1980 season, Lorne Michaels had lost both Dan Aykroyd and John Belushi to feature film careers, causing him to look to writers like Downey, Tom Schiller, Dan Aykroyd's brother Peter, Al Franken, Alan Zweibel, and Tom Davis to fill spots as cast members (along with SNL bandleader Paul Shaffer and newcomer Harry Shearer). Downey left the show in 1980 as part of the mass exodus of writers and actors following Lorne Michaels's departure.

=== Intermission ===
After leaving SNL, Downey became the second head writer of Late Night with David Letterman for a little over a year, from 1982 to 1984, during its formative stages. He is credited with inventing its Top Ten List and contributing to its influential sensibility and attracting other talented writers. Together with Letterman, Downey wrote a week long ongoing joke featuring the "World's Largest Vase."

=== Return to SNL ===
Downey became head writer for Michaels The New Show in 1984, which flopped and was cancelled after 9 episodes. Downey returned to SNL that same year as a writer with Dick Ebersol producing the show. Michaels returned to the show in 1985, naming Downey as head writer, a new position at the time. As head writer, Downey introduced rewrite sessions on Thursdays, which had not existed during the show’s first five years. Downey stayed in that position until the end of season 20 in 1995, after 10 years as head writer (the longest-tenure for an SNL head writer and one of the few writers from the previous season to return to season 21).

==== Norm Macdonald, Update and firing ====
Downey was responsible for Norm Macdonald becoming Weekend Update anchor in 1994, and beginning the next year wrote exclusively for that segment of the show after retiring as head writer. Downey and Macdonald subsequently became a team, working away from the rest of the cast and crew.

They were both fired from the show in early 1998, midway through season 23 at the request of NBC executive Don Ohlmeyer. Downey believes that it was a result of various jokes on Weekend Update calling O. J. Simpson a murderer; Ohlmeyer was a good friend of Simpson's. Downey would remain credited as a writer until the end of the season. He recalls receiving the phone call "a couple things: Chris Farley is dead and you and Norm are fired."

==== Later SNL career ====
Downey was rehired by Michaels in 2000, shortly following Ohlmeyer's retirement from NBC, as a specialized writer focusing on political comedy and cold opens. He credits the increased prevalence of political sketches on SNL to the changing political climate following the 2000 United States presidential election.

For an October 2000 sketch satirizing a recent presidential debate, Downey coined the word "strategery" for then-presidential candidate George W. Bush to say, based on Bush's reputation for difficulty with public speaking. The word soon began to be used in a tongue-in-cheek fashion by members of Bush's own administration, as well as by political pundits on both sides, to refer to the Bush administration's political strategy.

Downey continued to write for the show until 2013, pausing only in 2005 to work on a novel. In 2013, he retired from Saturday Night Live after the end of the 38th season after 30 non-consecutive years (making him the longest-tenured writer in the history of the show) writing for the show working part-time, commuting from Upstate New York. In retirement, he would still occasionally suggest jokes to writers that would make it on the show. During the SNL 40th Anniversary Special Bill Murray performed "Jaws", a parody song written by Downey that was first thought up after the film's initial release 40 years earlier. For the SNL 50th Anniversary Special, Downey helped put together an In Memoriam segment featuring poorly aged sketches.

=== Reception ===
SNL creator Lorne Michaels called Downey the "best political humorist alive" and "the voice of the show" during its first 20 years, while Conan O'Brien said he is "the great comedy writer that we all revere." Bill Murray has called him "the best writer that I ever worked with". John Mulaney described Downey's comedic style as "hyper-nuanced", with Downey himself saying it involves "someone laboriously explaining something that doesn’t need an explanation, and also getting it wrong."

Former SNL Weekend Update anchor Dennis Miller has called him the second most important person in the history of Saturday Night Live, behind only creator Lorne Michaels.

In 2023, a still image of Downey appearing on the podcast Conan O'Brien Needs a Friend became an internet meme, referencing a joke by Downey pretending to not be aware of Jeffrey Epstein's sexual misconduct allegations and his death, calling him "Jeffrey Epstein, the New York financier."

== Acting career ==
Although he was only a credited actor on Saturday Night Live for one season, Downey appeared in over 40 sketches from 1977 to 2005, his most notable being parody commercials such as Craig's Travellers Checks, First CityWide Change Bank, and Grayson Moorhead Securities. In 2007, he appeared in a Digital Short titled Andy's Dad, where he portrayed the father of cast member Andy Samberg, and had a romantic relationship with guest star Jonah Hill.

In movies, he is probably best remembered for playing the high school principal who judges the "academic decathlon" in Billy Madison. His brief role in that film includes a famous monologue in which he insults the title character, played by Adam Sandler, concluding with the sentence "I award you no points, and may God have mercy on your soul." The monologue was based on a response Downey often gave to SNL cast member (and fellow Billy Madison cast member) Chris Farley in the SNL writers' room when Farley presented certain ideas.

He appeared in the Norm Macdonald movie Dirty Work (1998) as a homeless person. Downey also had a bit part in Paul Thomas Anderson's 2007 film There Will Be Blood, where he plays Al Rose, Little Boston's real estate broker. Anderson's YouTube channel is Al Rose Promotions, a nod to Downey's role.

In 2025, Downey appeared in multiple projects. He had a bit part in Anderson's Academy Award for Best Picture-winning One Battle After Another playing Sandy Irvine, a member of the Christmas Adventurers, a fictitious white supremacy organization. Downey also played a supporting role in HBO's The Chair Company. That same year, Downey starred in Downey Wrote That, a documentary about his career at SNL directed by Brent Hodge that was released on Peacock. In 2026, Downey was featured in a post-credits scene of the 98th Academy Awards, reprising his One Battle After Another character.

== Political views ==
Given Downey's role in writing much of the political humor featured on Saturday Night Live during his tenure there, his own political leanings have been a source of speculation. Downey has said that he began his career as "a standard-issue Harvard graduate commie", but later turned into "a conservative Democrat". He is a registered Democratic Party member. In 2008, he expressed his support for then-presidential-candidate Barack Obama. Nonetheless, his comedic targets have included American politicians across the political spectrum. TV critic Tom Shales, author of the book Live from New York: The Uncensored History of Saturday Night Live, called Downey, and SNL, an "equal opportunity slasher" in political comedy.

Some have called Downey more right-wing than his self-description, including Shales, who described him in 2002 as "a Republican" and "pretty conservative". In the Huffington Post, former SNL head writer Adam McKay called Downey "right-wing" and an "Ann Coulter pal". On a 2019 podcast, Al Franken described Downey as a "thoughtful conservative."

On Trump, Downey says "I was sick of him before he even ran for president", having already mocked him in SNL sketches he wrote in the 1980s and describing him as a "beat-up, ridiculous character" and "semi-literate".

=== 2008 Obama and Clinton portrayal ===
In early 2008, Downey wrote sketches for SNL mocking the then-ongoing Democratic presidential debates that depicted the news media as biased toward Obama. After the first sketch aired, candidate Hillary Clinton referred to it at the beginning of the next debate. The sketches were controversial; McKay suggested that they were a ploy to favor Republicans, since Clinton would be a weaker candidate than Obama. In response, Downey "said he probably favored Mr. Obama over Mrs. Clinton, but that he genuinely felt she was receiving tougher treatment from the news media". He denied that SNL had intended to help Clinton. According to the Project for Excellence in Journalism the SNL sketches may have prompted tougher news coverage of Obama.

On Obama, he stated, "If I had to describe Obama as a comedy project, I would say, 'Degree of difficulty, 10 point 10.' It's like being a rock climber looking up at a thousand-foot-high face of solid obsidian, polished and oiled. There's not a single thing to grab onto—certainly not a flaw or hook that you can caricature."

== Personal life ==
Downey is married and has children. In 2025 he became a grandfather. He met his wife at Saturday Night Live.

== Filmography ==
=== Television ===
Year	Title	Role	Notes
1977–80; 1984–98; 2000–05; 2006–13	Saturday Night Live	Writer, producer, actor	
1981	Steve Martin's Best Show Ever	Writer	
1982–84	Late Night with David Letterman	Writer	48 episodes
1984	The New Show	Writer	5 episodes
2008–09; 2012	Saturday Night Live Weekend Update Thursday	Writer	7 episodes
2011	Curb Your Enthusiasm	Board Member #1	Episode: "Larry vs. Michael J. Fox"
2013	30 Rock	Downey	Episode: "Hogcock!"
2017	Veep	Jim Caldwell	Episode: "Groundbreaking"
2020	Our Cartoon President	Adam Schiff (voice)	Episode: "Impeachment"
2025	The Chair Company	Douglas	3 episodes

=== Film ===
Year	Title	Role	Notes
1977	The Brain Machine	T.V. Announcer	
1988	Bum Rap	Steg	
1993	Wayne's World 2	Jeff Wong (voice)	
1995	Billy Madison	Principal	
1995	The Little Patriot	Adjutant	
1998	Dirty Work	Martin, Homeless Guy	
2007	There Will Be Blood	Al Rose	
2025	Happy Gilmore 2	Championship Tour Starter	
2025	One Battle After Another	Sandy Irvine	
2025	Downey Wrote That	Himself	Documentary
2026	Lorne	Himself	Documentary
