= Dick Ebersol =

American television executive (born 1947)

- Ebersol in 2009
- Born: Duncan Richard Ebersol; July 28, 1947 (age 79); Torrington, Connecticut, U.S.
- Education: Yale University
- Occupation: American television executive NBC
- Spouses: Susan Stafford (m. 1976; ann. 1981) Susan Saint James (m. 1981; died 2026)
- Children: 3, including Charlie

Duncan Richard Ebersol (/ˈɛbərsɒl/; born July 28, 1947) is an American television executive and a senior adviser for NBC Universal Sports & Olympics. He had previously been the chairman of NBC Sports, producing large-scale television events such as the Olympic Games and National Football League broadcasts. Ebersol is a six-time Emmy Award winner.

== Early life ==
Ebersol was born on July 28, 1947, in Torrington, Connecticut. His mother is Mary (née Duncan), and his father is Charles Roberts Ebersol, a former chairman of the American Cancer Society. He and Josiah Bunting III are half-brothers. In 1967, aged 20, Ebersol began his long history with the Olympics when he temporarily dropped out of Yale University to join Roone Arledge and ABC Sports as television's first-ever Olympic researcher.

== Career ==
=== Move to NBC ===
In 1974, he joined NBC as Director of Weekend Late Night Programming. In 1975, at the suggestion of Paramount Pictures executive Barry Diller, Ebersol and NBC president Herbert Schlosser approached Lorne Michaels for help in creating a show to fill the Saturday night time slot. Michaels's idea for a variety show featuring high-concept comedy sketches, political satire, and music performances eventually became Saturday Night Live.

Named as Vice President of Late Night Programming at age 28, Ebersol became NBC's first vice president under the age of 30. After a brief departure, he returned to SNL in 1981 as executive producer and remained until 1985, spanning the Eddie Murphy and Billy Crystal eras. In 1983, Ebersol formed No Sleep Productions, an independent production company that created Emmy Award-winning NBC shows Friday Night Videos and Later with Bob Costas. Together with Vince McMahon, Ebersol produced Saturday Night's Main Event. When Ebersol left SNL in 1985, he devoted his time to his production company until rejoining NBC in 1989. He served as senior vice president of NBC News.

=== NBC Sports ===
Ebersol became president of NBC Sports in 1989, and was promoted to chairman, NBC Sports & Olympics in June 1998. He served as executive producer for the 1992 Barcelona Olympic Games, his first Olympics since Munich in 1972 for ABC.

His early tenure at NBC Sports was highlighted by a string of sports-property acquisitions and renewals, including the NFL, NBA, Notre Dame football and MLB, through the formation of the joint-venture Baseball Network. During the 1995–96 television season, for the only time in history, the World Series, Super Bowl, NBA Finals and Summer Olympics were telecast by the same network. It was following this run in 1996 that The Sporting News named Ebersol the "Most Powerful Person in Sports." By January 1998, NBC had become the home of four Super Bowls in six years.

In 1993, he secured the rights to the 1996 Atlanta Summer Olympics.

In August 1995, he acquired the rights for the 2000 Summer Olympics in Sydney and the 2002 Winter Olympics in Salt Lake City. It marked the first time that rights for consecutive Olympics were awarded at the same time. Later that same year, he spearheaded NBC Sports' acquisition of the exclusive media rights for the 2004 and 2008 Summer Olympics, and the 2006 Winter Olympics. The agreements marked the first time that the same network had been awarded the rights to five consecutive Olympics.

In 2003, Ebersol led NBC to acquire the exclusive U.S. media rights to the 2010 Winter Games and the 2012 Summer Olympics. In December 2003, Ebersol agreed to a nine-year contract to continue running NBC Sports & Olympics through 2012. He assumed the title as Chairman of NBC Universal Sports & Olympics in May 2004 when NBC and Universal merged.

Ebersol produced:

- the Beijing Olympic Games in 2008 (the most-watched event in U.S. television history with a record 215 million viewers)
- the Vancouver Olympic Winter Games in 2010 (second-most watched Winter Olympics in history with 190 million viewers)
- Super Bowl XLIII in February 2009 produced, at the time, the largest-single audience in U.S. television history with a record 152 million viewers.

It is currently the second-most viewed program of all time. The Super Bowl milestone was made possible in 2005 when Ebersol spearheaded the effort to return the NFL to NBC by negotiating a six-year agreement that included moving the NFL primetime broadcast package from Monday night to Sunday night, flexible scheduling for the first time ever, and Super Bowls in 2009 and 2012.

On May 19, 2011, Ebersol resigned from NBC Sports. The New York Times stated that he intended to stay at NBC through the end of June 2011. It was later reported that Ebersol would return to NBC Sports in time for the beginning of the 2011 NFL season to serve in a senior adviser role.

=== Alliance of American Football ===
Ebersol served on the board of directors of the Alliance of American Football (AAF), a professional American football league co-founded by his son Charlie and Bill Polian. Ebersol and his son were both ousted from the board of directors when Thomas Dundon purchased the league.

=== Awards and honors ===
Ebersol has often been in the top 10 honorees on The Sporting News' annual list of the 100 most powerful sports figures, including in 1996 when he was named the Most Powerful Person in Sports. In 1992, Ebersol was awarded the Olympic Order, an honor periodically bestowed by the International Olympic Committee to recognize remarkable contributions to the Olympic Movement.

In 2005, Ebersol was inducted into both the U.S. Olympic Hall of Fame and the Broadcasting & Cable Hall of Fame.

In 2008, NBC won the Peabody Award for its coverage of the Beijing Opening Ceremony along with Chinese film director Zhang Yimou, who served as the event's creative director. At the 2009 SportsBusiness Journal awards ceremony, Ebersol won Sports Executive of the Year and NBC Sports won Best in Sports Television.

On April 27, 2009, the six "Commissioners of American Sport" – Roger Goodell (NFL), David Stern (NBA), Bud Selig (MLB), Gary Bettman (NHL), Tim Finchem (PGA Tour) and Brian France (NASCAR) – were part of a presentation that concluded with Muhammad Ali awarding Ebersol the Emmy Award for Lifetime Achievement from the National Academy of Television Arts & Sciences.

In May 2010, Ebersol was the commencement speaker at Sacred Heart University for its graduating class of 2010. He was presented with a Doctor of Humane Letters by University President Anthony J. Cernera.

Ebersol is the 2014 recipient of the Paul White Award, the highest award presented by the Radio Television Digital News Association.

In 2026, Molly Solomon, who the New York Times' Andrew Marchand called "the most successful female sports executive in the history of television", attributed her career success to Ebersol's mentorship.

== Personal life ==
Ebersol was previously married to former Wheel of Fortune hostess Susan Stafford from 1976 to 1981. They had no children. He was married to actress Susan Saint James for 45 years from 1981 until her death in 2026. They had three sons together, Charlie, Willie, and Teddy, who died in a plane crash in 2004. Saint James had two children from a previous marriage.

=== 2004 plane crash ===
On November 28, 2004, a private charter jet, a Bombardier Challenger CL-600, carrying Ebersol and two of his sons, Charlie and Teddy, crashed during an attempted takeoff from Montrose Regional Airport in Colorado. The jet's captain, Luis Polanco, flight attendant Warren T. Richardson III, and Teddy Ebersol were killed. Dick and his older son, Charlie, along with the first officer, survived, though seriously injured. Charlie was thrown clear off the plane and rushed back inside and managed to pull his father to safety.

On June 10, 2006, Teddy Ebersol Field was dedicated along the Charles River in Boston.

== Selected list of shows produced by Ebersol ==
- Football Night in America
- Friday Night Videos
- Midnight Special
- Later with Bob Costas
- Saturday Night Live
  - History of Saturday Night Live
- Saturday Night's Main Event
- 2008 Summer Olympics
