= List of Saturday Night Live cast members =

Original cast (from left to right): Laraine Newman, John Belushi, Jane Curtin, Gilda Radner, Dan Aykroyd, Garrett Morris, and Chevy Chase. (Note: The original cast also consisted of George Coe and Michael O'Donoghue, although both were no longer credited as main cast members prior to the end of the show's first season, and thus they are not pictured here.)

As of September 2026, the late-night live variety series Saturday Night Live (SNL) has featured 174 cast members. The ensemble was originally referred to as the Not Ready for Prime Time Players.

== List ==
As of 2026, 174 comedians have served as cast members on the show. Sid Caesar is the only person to be named an honorary cast member. Caesar was presented with a plaque during the goodnights of his hosting stint in 1983.

=== Table ===
Saturday Night Live cast members (Note: This list includes both repertory and featured players past and present – and a three year period when there was a distinct category of performers, here called the "Middle group", introduced after the main repertory players by the announcer saying "...with" and reading off these performers before saying "... featuring" for the featured players. This list omits SNL writers and others who were not listed as cast members during the show's credits. The dates given are those of the years they were part of the cast. The chart also shows whether the cast member has served as a guest host, appeared as the anchorperson of the "Weekend Update" segment (by any of its titles), or has been the subject of their own "Best of" home video collection. Many of the cast members were writers as well.)
Performer	Start	End	Total seasons	Repertory player	Featured player	Middle group (Note: For three consecutive seasons at the start of the 1990s (season 16 to season 18), there was a distinct category of performers, artificially defined here as the "middle group", who were are introduced after the main repertory players by the announcer saying "...with" and reading off these performers, before saying "... featuring" for the featured players. During those seasons, this "middle group" of players were considered a full member of the cast – though not headlining members of the repertory group – and credited even if they did not appear in an episode. By comparison, unlike later years, "featured" players were only credited in episodes they appeared in. This was a transition period from the earlier notion of featured being a rarely used additional performer only worthy of mention when they appeared in an episode, to the now ongoing notion of featured players being a regular part of the season's ongoing cast, even if not used in a few episodes.)	Weekend Update anchor	Hosted	Best of...	Writer
Fred Armisen	2002	2013	11	✓	✓			✓		
Aristotle Athari	2021	2022	1		✓					
Dan Aykroyd	1975	1979	4	✓			✓	✓	✓	✓
Peter Aykroyd	1980		1		✓					✓
Morwenna Banks	1995		1	✓						
Vanessa Bayer	2010	2017	7	✓	✓					
Saidah Belo-Osagie	2026	present	1		✓					
Jim Belushi	1983	1985	2	✓						✓
John Belushi	1975	1979	4	✓					✓	✓
Beck Bennett	2013	2021	8	✓	✓					
Tommy Brennan	2025	present	2		✓					
Jim Breuer	1995	1998	3	✓						
Paul Brittain	2010	2012	2		✓					
A. Whitney Brown	1986	1991	6		✓					✓
Aidy Bryant	2012	2022	10	✓	✓					
Beth Cahill	1991	1992	1		✓					
Dana Carvey	1986	1993	7	✓				✓	✓	
Chevy Chase	1975	1976	2	✓			✓	✓	✓	✓
Michael Che	2014	present	13	✓	✓		✓			✓
Ellen Cleghorne	1991	1995	4	✓		✓				
George Coe	1975		1	✓						
Billy Crystal	1984	1985	1	✓			✓	✓		✓
Jane Curtin	1975	1980	5	✓			✓			
Jeremy Culhane	2025	present	2		✓					
Joan Cusack	1985	1986	1	✓						
Pete Davidson	2014	2022	8	✓	✓			✓		
Tom Davis	1979	1980	1		✓					✓
Mikey Day	2016	present	11	✓	✓					✓
Denny Dillon	1980	1981	1	✓						
Andrew Dismukes	2020	present	7	✓	✓					✓
Jim Downey	1980		1		✓					✓
Robert Downey Jr.	1985	1986	1	✓				✓		
Brian Doyle-Murray	1980		2	✓	✓		✓			✓
Brian Doyle-Murray	1981	1982	2	✓	✓		✓			✓
Rachel Dratch	1999	2006	7	✓	✓					
Robin Duke	1981	1984	4	✓						✓
Nora Dunn	1985	1990	5	✓						
Christine Ebersole	1981	1982	1	✓			✓			
Dean Edwards	2001	2003	2		✓					
Abby Elliott	2008	2012	4	✓	✓					
Chris Elliott	1994	1995	1	✓						
Jimmy Fallon	1998	2004	6	✓	✓		✓	✓	✓	
Siobhan Fallon	1991	1992	1			✓				
Chris Farley	1990	1995	5	✓		✓		✓	✓	
Will Ferrell	1995	2002	7	✓				✓	✓	
Tina Fey	2000	2006	6	✓	✓		✓	✓		✓
Chloe Fineman	2019	2026	7	✓	✓					
Will Forte	2002	2010	8	✓	✓			✓		
Al Franken	1979	1980	8		✓					✓
Al Franken	1986		8		✓					✓
Al Franken	1988	1995	8		✓					✓
Heidi Gardner	2017	2025	8	✓	✓					
Janeane Garofalo	1994	1995	1	✓						
Ana Gasteyer	1996	2002	6	✓						
Gilbert Gottfried	1980	1981	1	✓						
Mary Gross	1981	1985	4	✓			✓			✓
Christopher Guest	1984	1985	1	✓			✓			✓
Bill Hader	2005	2013	8	✓	✓			✓		
Anthony Michael Hall	1985	1986	1	✓						
Brad Hall	1982	1984	2	✓			✓			
Rich Hall	1984	1985	1	✓						✓
Darrell Hammond	1995	2009	14	✓						
Phil Hartman	1986	1994	8	✓				✓	✓	✓
Marcello Hernández	2022	present	5	✓	✓					
Lauren Holt	2020	2021	1		✓					
Jan Hooks	1986	1991	5	✓						
Yvonne Hudson	1980	1981	1		✓					
Melanie Hutsell	1991	1994	3	✓	✓	✓				
Victoria Jackson	1986	1992	6	✓						
James Austin Johnson	2021	present	6	✓	✓					
Punkie Johnson	2020	2024	4	✓	✓					
Leslie Jones	2014	2019	5	✓	✓					✓
Colin Jost	2014	present	14	✓	✓		✓			✓
Chris Kattan	1996	2003	8	✓	✓				✓	
Tim Kazurinsky	1981	1984	4	✓						✓
Molly Kearney	2022	2024	2		✓					
Laura Kightlinger	1994	1995	1		✓					✓
Taran Killam	2010	2016	6	✓	✓					
David Koechner	1995	1996	1	✓						
Gary Kroeger	1982	1985	3	✓						
Matthew Laurance	1980	1981	1		✓					
Michael Longfellow	2022	2025	3	✓	✓					
Julia Louis-Dreyfus	1982	1985	3	✓				✓		
Jon Lovitz	1985	1990	5	✓				✓	✓	
Norm Macdonald	1993	1998	5	✓	✓		✓	✓		✓
Ben Marshall	2025	present	2		✓					✓
Gail Matthius	1980	1981	1	✓			✓			
Michael McKean	1994	1995	2	✓				✓		
Mark McKinney	1995	1997	3	✓						✓
Kate McKinnon	2012	2022	11	✓	✓			✓		
Tim Meadows	1991	2000	10	✓		✓			✓	✓
Laurie Metcalf	1981		1		✓					
Seth Meyers	2001	2014	13	✓	✓		✓	✓		✓
John Milhiser	2013	2014	1		✓					
Dennis Miller	1985	1991	6	✓			✓			
Jerry Minor	2000	2001	1		✓					✓
Finesse Mitchell	2003	2006	3	✓	✓					
Alex Moffat	2016	2022	6	✓	✓					
Jay Mohr	1993	1995	2		✓					✓
Kyle Mooney	2013	2022	9	✓	✓					
Tracy Morgan	1996	2003	7	✓				✓	✓	
Garrett Morris	1975	1980	5	✓						✓
Bobby Moynihan	2008	2017	9	✓	✓					
Eddie Murphy	1980	1984	4	✓	✓			✓	✓	✓
Bill Murray	1977	1980	4	✓			✓	✓		✓
Mike Myers	1989	1995	7	✓	✓			✓	✓	✓
Kevin Nealon	1986	1995	9	✓	✓		✓			✓
Laraine Newman	1975	1980	5	✓						
Don Novello	1979	1980	2		✓			✓		✓
Don Novello	1985	1986	2		✓			✓		✓
Luke Null	2017	2018	1		✓					
Ego Nwodim	2018	2025	7	✓	✓					
Mike O'Brien	2013	2014	1		✓					✓
Michael O'Donoghue	1975		1	✓						✓
Cheri Oteri	1995	2000	5	✓					✓	
Ashley Padilla	2024	present	3	✓	✓					
Chris Parnell	1998	2006	8	✓	✓					
Kam Patterson	2025	present	2		✓					
Nasim Pedrad	2009	2014	5	✓	✓					
Jay Pharoah	2010	2016	6	✓	✓					
Joe Piscopo	1980	1984	4	✓						✓
Amy Poehler	2001	2008	8	✓	✓		✓	✓	✓	
Emily Prager	1981		1		✓					
Randy Quaid	1985	1986	1	✓						
Colin Quinn	1996	2000	5	✓	✓		✓			✓
Gilda Radner	1975	1980	5	✓					✓	
Chris Redd	2017	2022	5	✓	✓					
Grace Reiter	2026	present	1		✓					
Jeff Richards	2001	2004	3	✓	✓					
Rob Riggle	2004	2005	1		✓					
Ann Risley	1980	1981	1	✓						
Tim Robinson	2012	2013	1		✓					✓
Chris Rock	1990	1993	3	✓		✓		✓	✓	
Charles Rocket	1980	1981	1	✓			✓			
Tony Rosato	1981	1982	2	✓						✓
Jon Rudnitsky	2015	2016	1		✓					
Maya Rudolph	2000	2007	9	✓	✓			✓		
Andy Samberg	2005	2012	7	✓	✓			✓		✓
Adam Sandler	1991	1995	5	✓	✓	✓		✓	✓	✓
Horatio Sanz	1998	2006	8	✓	✓		✓			
Tom Schiller	1980		1		✓					✓
Rob Schneider	1990	1994	4	✓	✓	✓				✓
Paul Shaffer	1979	1980	1		✓			✓		
Molly Shannon	1995	2001	7	✓	✓			✓	✓	
Harry Shearer	1979	1980	2	✓	✓					✓
Harry Shearer	1984	1985	2	✓	✓					✓
Sarah Sherman	2021	present	6	✓	✓					
Martin Short	1984	1985	1	✓				✓		✓
Sarah Silverman	1993	1994	1		✓			✓		✓
Jenny Slate	2009	2010	1		✓					
Veronika Slowikowska	2025	present	2		✓					
Robert Smigel	1991	1993	2		✓					✓
David Spade	1990	1996	6	✓	✓	✓		✓	✓	✓
Pamela Stephenson	1984	1985	1	✓						
Ben Stiller	1989		1		✓			✓		✓
Cecily Strong	2012	2022	11	✓	✓		✓			
Jason Sudeikis	2005	2013	9	✓	✓			✓		✓
Julia Sweeney	1990	1994	4	✓		✓				
Terry Sweeney	1985	1986	1	✓						✓
Kenan Thompson	2003	present	24	✓	✓					
Chloe Troast	2023	2024	1		✓					
Danitra Vance	1985	1986	1	✓						
Melissa Villaseñor	2016	2022	6	✓	✓					
Dan Vitale	1985	1986	1		✓					
Devon Walker	2022	2025	3	✓	✓					
Nancy Walls	1995	1996	1	✓						
Emil Wakim	2024	2025	1		✓					
Michaela Watkins	2008	2009	1		✓					
Damon Wayans	1985	1986	1		✓			✓		
Patrick Weathers	1980	1981	1		✓					
Noël Wells	2013	2014	1		✓					
Brooks Wheelan	2013	2014	1		✓					
Jane Wickline	2024	present	3	✓	✓					
Kristen Wiig	2005	2012	7	✓	✓			✓		
Casey Wilson	2008	2009	2		✓					
Fred Wolf	1996	1996	2		✓					✓
Bowen Yang	2019	2025	7	✓	✓					✓
Sasheer Zamata	2014	2017	4	✓	✓					
Alan Zweibel	1980		1		✓					✓

=== Timeline ===
Lighter colors denote "featured players" versus repertory cast members.

== Tenures ==
=== Longest tenures ===
The following comedians have served as cast members on the show for more than 9 seasons:

Saturday Night Live cast members with the longest tenures
Name	Total seasons	Start	End	Notes
Kenan Thompson	24 (Note: The number of seasons assumes that the cast members will continue to serve in that role through the end of the current season)	2003	present	Promoted to repertory player in his third season on the show.
Darrell Hammond	14	1995	2009	At the time of his departure, Hammond had the longest tenure as a cast member on the show. In 2014, Hammond returned to the show as the announcer following the death of longtime announcer Don Pardo.
Colin Jost	13 ½ (Note: ½ season is used to indicate a portion of a season, not necessarily 50% of the episodes of the partial season)	2014	present	Jost has been a writer at SNL since 2005, and has been anchoring Weekend Update since 2014. He had also been a head writer for the show from 2012 to 2015, and again from 2017 until 2022.
Michael Che	13	2014	present	Che has been a writer for SNL since 2013, and started anchoring Weekend Update a year later. Che and Jost are the show's longest running Weekend Update anchors, and serving as co-head writers together from 2017 until 2022.
Seth Meyers	12 ½	2001	2014	Meyers anchored Weekend Update from 2006 to 2014. At the time of his departure, he was the longest-serving Weekend Update anchor, however, he has been surpassed by current co-anchor Colin Jost. Jost's co-anchor Michael Che also surpassed Meyers (but not Jost, who currently holds the record). He left the show to become the host of Late Night. Meyers also served as head writer for 9 seasons.
Fred Armisen	11	2002	2013	Promoted to repertory player in his third season on the show.
Mikey Day	11	2016	present	Day initially joined the show as a writer in 2013. He was promoted to the cast as a featured player in 2016, and was promoted to repertory status in 2018.
Cecily Strong	10 ½ (Note: Strong is listed ahead of McKinnon because Strong appeared in 9 episodes in her partial season, whereas McKinnon appeared in 5 episodes in her partial season)	2012	2022	Strong is currently the longest tenured female player on the show.
Kate McKinnon	10 ½	2012	2022	McKinnon has stated in an interview that she was planning to leave the show in 2020, but instead remained for two more years due to the COVID-19 pandemic.
Aidy Bryant	10	2012	2022	In an interview, Bryant said that she planned to leave at the end of the show's 45th season in 2020, but ended up postponing her departure by two years, due to the COVID-19 pandemic.
Tim Meadows	9½	1991	2000	At the time of his departure, Meadows had the longest tenure as a cast member on the show.

=== Shortest tenures ===
Two people have been publicly announced as having been hired to the cast, but never performed as cast members:

- Catherine O'Hara, hired in 1981, quit before appearing on air. She subsequently hosted the show twice.
- Shane Gillis was announced as a cast member in 2019, but the offer was withdrawn due to controversies surrounding previous use of racial stereotypes. Gillis went on to host episode 12 of season 49, episode 13 of season 50, and episode 3 of season 52. Eight months after Gillis' first hosting appearance on the show, executive producer Lorne Michaels revealed that the decision to fire Gillis was not his, and it was forced on him by NBC executives.

The following cast members spent less than a full 20-episode season on the show.

Saturday Night Live cast members with the shortest tenures
Name	Total episodes	Notes
George Coe (1975)	1	He was one of the original "Not-Ready-for-Primetime Players", because NBC wanted someone older in the cast. He was credited as a cast member for only the first episode, though he continued to make several uncredited appearances throughout the first season.
Tom Schiller (1980)	1	One of the show writers and resident filmmakers who was made a featured player for only one episode: the April 19, 1980 show in season five. He left the show at the end of the season. He made several short films during his time at the show, including some after his brief time in the cast, and made several short films between seasons 14 and 19.
Alan Zweibel (1980)	1	A writer for the show who, along with Tom Schiller, was credited as a featured player for only the April 19, 1980 episode in season five. He left the show as a writer after the season finale.
Laurie Metcalf (1981)	1	She was hired as part of Ebersol's temporary season six cast following the termination of Jean Doumanian, and appeared on-camera in a Weekend Update piece. When the show was put on hiatus for retooling, she was not chosen to return to the show for season seven.
Emily Prager (1981)	1	She was hired as part of Ebersol's temporary season six cast following the termination of Jean Doumanian. Although she did not appear in the single episode for which she was credited as a featured player, she had appeared uncredited in five previous episodes, between 1977 and 1981. When the show was put on hiatus for retooling, she was not chosen to return to the show for season seven.
Dan Vitale (1985–1986)	2	Hired as an on-and-off featured player for season 11, he was only credited with appearing in two episodes throughout the season but appeared uncredited in a few more.
Michael O'Donoghue (1975)	3	One of the original "Not Ready for Primetime Players" and the show's first head writer. He was only credited as a cast member for the first, third, and fourth episode before being removed. He remained with the show as a writer (leaving and returning twice). He was only officially a cast member for three episodes, though he would continue as an occasional on-screen performer, often billed as a special guest in the opening credits as "impressionist Michael O'Donoghue" or as his alter ego "Mr. Mike."
Jim Downey (1980)	3	He was one of many writers-turned-featured players in season five, only being credited for three episodes. Though he left the show after the season, he returned to the show as a writer in 1984, and was promoted to head writer the next season in 1985, a position he held for 10 years. After resigning as head writer, he remained with the show on-and-off until 2013.
Ben Stiller (1989)	4	Before becoming a cast member, he submitted a short film (a parody of the film The Color of Money) that was shown on the season 12 episode hosted by Charlton Heston. He was hired during season 14, but quit after four episodes due to creative differences. Despite this, he returned to host in 1998 and 2011 and later had a recurring role as Michael Cohen, Donald Trump's ex-lawyer.
Morwenna Banks (1995)	4	She was hired as a repertory player for the last four episodes of season 20, but was fired as part of a major cast overhaul Lorne Michaels had planned for season 21.
Fred Wolf (1996)	4	He had been a writer since 1993 and, was named as a co-head writer at the start of season 21 in 1995 (being one of the few writers from the previous season to return), and became a featured player near the end for the last four episodes of the season. However, he only appeared in and was credited for episodes 17, 18, and 20. His last episode was in the third episode of the 22nd season (the only episode of that season he was credited for), after which he decided to leave the show.
Peter Aykroyd (1980)	6	Dan Aykroyd's brother Peter joined the show midway through season five, but left at the end of the season, after only being credited for six episodes.
Yvonne Hudson (1980–1981)	6	She was a recurring extra during season five, and became the first black female cast member in season six when she was made a featured player. She was fired from the cast midseason but continued to appear in extra parts.
Matthew Laurance (1980–1981)	8	Hired as a featured player during season six, he was fired as part of the mid-season overhaul.
Patrick Weathers (1980–1981)	8	Hired as a featured cast member for season six, he was fired along with many of Doumanian's cast.
Paul Shaffer (1979–1980)	10	After being the band's pianist for the first five seasons, he joined the cast during season five, being credited sporadically throughout the season, but left with the rest of the original cast and writers after the finale. He hosted SNL in 1987, making him the only member of the house band to do so.
Robert Smigel (1991–1993)	10	A longtime writer of SNL who appeared occasionally uncredited until becoming a featured player for the 1991–92 season. He remained with the show through the 1992–93 season before leaving to be the head writer of Late Night with Conan O'Brien. Smigel returned to write his "TV Funhouse" segment from 1996 until 2008, but did not return to the cast. He was only credited during the opening sequence for four episodes in his first season as a featured player and for six episodes in his second season.
Tom Davis (1979–1980)	12	Davis was hired as one of the original writers for its first five seasons, and became a featured cast member for season 5, but left with the rest of the original cast and writers after the season finale. Davis did return as a writer for the show from 1985 to 1994, before leaving the show.
Gilbert Gottfried (1980–1981)	12	He joined the cast for season six and was fired as part of the mid-season overhaul.
Ann Risley (1980–1981)	12	She joined the cast for season six and was fired as part of the mid-season overhaul.
Charles Rocket (1980–1981)	12	He joined the cast for season six and was fired as part of the mid-season overhaul, after having said "fuck" on-air one episode prior.
Damon Wayans (1985–1986)	12	Hired for season 11 as a featured player, he was fired mid-season for improvising on the air. He returned as a guest to perform stand-up comedy on season 11's last episode and hosted SNL in 1995.
Don Novello (1979–1980, 1985–1986)	13	SNL writer Don Novello appeared frequently throughout the show's history as his character Father Guido Sarducci, but he was only a featured player for part of the 1979–80 season and part of the 1985–86 season, credited sporadically only when he would appear on the show. He made many more appearances outside of these two runs as a featured player, but he was usually credited as a "special guest" in the opening or not credited at all. Novello even returned to host and co-host two episodes as Sarducci in 1984.
Denny Dillon (1980–1981)	13	She joined the cast for season six and was fired after the finale as part of the cast overhaul. She unsuccessfully auditioned for the show's first season.
Gail Matthius (1980–1981)	13	She joined the cast for season six and was fired after the season ended.
Beth Cahill (1991–1992)	13	She joined the show during season 17 as an off-and-on featured player. She did not return the following season, as she was fired along with castmate Siobhan Fallon.
Sarah Silverman (1993–1994)	14	Silverman joined the writing staff at the beginning of season 19 and was introduced as a featured player in the season's sixth episode. She was fired from both positions at the end of the season.
Janeane Garofalo (1994–1995)	14	She joined the cast during season 20, but quit mid-season due to creative differences.
Michaela Watkins (2008–2009)	15	She joined the show on the first episode after the 2008 United States presidential election, then departed before the start of season 35.

== President of the United States impressionists ==
Portrayal of sitting Presidents of the United States
Sitting President	Performer (years)
Gerald Ford	Chevy Chase (1975–1976)
Jimmy Carter	Dan Aykroyd (1977–1979); Joe Piscopo (1980–1981)
Ronald Reagan	Charles Rocket (1981); Joe Piscopo (1981–1984); Harry Shearer (1984); Randy Quaid (1985–1986); Robin Williams (1986) (Note: Performed once when Williams hosted the show, on November 22, 1986.); Phil Hartman (1986–1989)
George H. W. Bush	Dana Carvey (1989–1993)
Bill Clinton	Phil Hartman (1993–1994); Michael McKean (1994–1995); Darrell Hammond (1995–2001)
George W. Bush	Will Ferrell (2001–2002); Chris Parnell (2002–2003); Darrell Hammond (2003); Will Forte (2004–2006); Jason Sudeikis (2006–2008)
Barack Obama	Fred Armisen (2009–2012); Jay Pharoah (2012–2016)
Donald Trump	Alec Baldwin (2017–2020) (Note: Impersonation performed as a recurring guest.)
Joe Biden	Alex Moffat (2021); James Austin Johnson (2021–2023); Jason Sudeikis (2021) (Note: Performed once when Sudeikis hosted the show, on October 23, 2021. During his time as cast member, Sudeikis portrayed Joe Biden when Biden was a candidate for president during the 2008 Democratic presidential primaries, as well as Vice President after the election.); Mikey Day (2023–2024); Dana Carvey (2024)
Donald Trump	James Austin Johnson (2025–present)

Darrell Hammond had the longest tenure portraying a U.S. president, portraying Bill Clinton from 1995 to 2001 and George W. Bush during 2003. He, Joe Piscopo, Phil Hartman, and James Austin Johnson are the only cast members to have portrayed two sitting presidents. Jason Sudeikis portrayed two sitting presidents, but the portrayal of the second president was performed as a host, rather than a cast member. Dana Carvey also portrayed two sitting presidents, with the portrayal of the second president performed as a recurring guest.

George H. W. Bush enjoyed Dana Carvey's impersonation of him. Carvey was invited to headline a White House Christmas party in 1992, during the lame duck period after Bush had lost the election. Two years later, on October 22, 1994, when Carvey hosted the show for the first time, Bush appeared in pre-recorded videos, in both the cold open and the opening monologue, critiquing Carvey's impersonation of him.

Presidents are not usually portrayed on Saturday Night Live after they leave office. Exceptions are limited to the portrayal of former president Richard Nixon, who resigned prior to the launch of the show in 1975; Bill Clinton, who appeared in sketches related to the presidential campaigns of his wife, Hillary Clinton; and Donald Trump, who continued to be politically active after leaving office. Dan Aykroyd portrayed Nixon from 1975 to 1979, and Darrell Hammond portrayed Nixon on episode 12 of season 34. James Austin Johnson portrayed Trump during the period between Trump's two presidencies (seasons 47–50).

=== Impersonation of Donald Trump ===
Donald Trump, having been a public figure before being president, was portrayed by several cast members over the years. He was portrayed by Phil Hartman (1988–1990), Darrell Hammond (1999–2011, 2015–2016), Jason Sudeikis (2012) and Taran Killam (2015). Alec Baldwin started impersonating Trump as a guest during the 42nd season of SNL in late 2016, when Trump was the Republican nominee during the 2016 United States presidential elections. Baldwin continued with the guest impersonations of Trump after the elections when Trump was president-elect, as well as after Trump was sworn in as president. Baldwin continued to impersonate Trump throughout Trump's first presidency.

Alec Baldwin's impersonation of Donald Trump earned him an Emmy award in 2017, in spite of his public declaration that he "loathes the role" due to his personal disdain for Trump. At the end of Season 44, Baldwin publicly announced that he would no longer be impersonating Trump, but changed his mind prior to the beginning of Season 45 after SNL executive producer Lorne Michaels convinced him to continue with the impersonation. Following the 2020 presidential elections in which Trump lost re-election, Baldwin's tenure as Trump ended in the subsequent episode; he responded by tweeting "I don't believe I've ever been this overjoyed to lose a job before!" From the beginning of Trump's second term to present, he was portrayed by cast member James Austin Johnson (who played the role several times between Trump's two presidencies).

Trump has criticized Baldwin's portrayal on multiple occasions. In response, Baldwin taunted Trump with statements such as "release your tax returns and I'll stop." In June 2021, after Trump had left office, it was reported that while Trump was in office he had inquired if the Federal Communications Commission or the United States Justice Department could force SNL to stop portraying him. Trump denied that he has ever made such an inquiry, but claimed that his portrayal by SNL "should be considered an illegal campaign contribution from the Democrat Party." He also criticized Baldwin's portrayal of him, but praised Darrell Hammond's portrayal of him.

== Returning to host ==
Over three dozen former SNL cast members have returned to host the show. The first former cast member to host the show was Chevy Chase in February 1978. Chase is also the first former cast member to reach the Five-Timers Club, and is the most frequent-former cast member to host (he is also one of few hosts banned from hosting, having last hosted in 1997). Chase returned as a guest at the 50th Anniversary Special.

In addition to Chase, other former cast members that are in the Five-Timers Club are Bill Murray, Tina Fey, Will Ferrell, Kristen Wiig and Martin Short. Ferrell and Fey have each hosted six times.

The show's 22nd season is notable, as seven of the 20 hosts were former cast members. They included Dana Carvey, Robert Downey Jr., Phil Hartman, Chris Rock, Martin Short, Chase and Mike Myers.

Julia Louis-Dreyfus was the first former female cast member to host the show; hosting it near the end of its 31st season in May 2006.

While the majority of cast members who also hosted the show were first cast members and then hosted after leaving the show, there have been two cast members who have hosted the show prior to joining the cast: Billy Crystal (he hosted the show twice during the ninth season prior to joining the cast in the tenth season) and Michael McKean (he hosted the show in the tenth season and joined the cast in the nineteenth season). McKean is also the only eventual cast member who first appeared as a musical guest (with Spinal Tap, May 1984).

Eddie Murphy is the only cast member to have hosted the show while still a cast member. He also holds the distinction of having the longest gap between successive hosting of the show, with his second and third hostings of the show having been 35 years and 6 days apart.

Adam Sandler and Dan Aykroyd tie the record of the longest gap between leaving the show as a cast member and returning as a host. Both hosted the show for the first time nine days shy of 24 years from their last appearance as cast members. However, both made appearances on the show during the gap. On the flip side, Bill Murray holds the record for having the shortest gap between leaving the show and returning to host at 287 days after leaving the cast.

Saturday Night Live cast members who have hosted
Name	Total episodes	First hosted	Last hosted
Fred Armisen	1	May 21, 2016	
Dan Aykroyd	1	May 17, 2003	
Dana Carvey	4	October 22, 1994	February 5, 2011
Chevy Chase	8	February 18, 1978	February 15, 1997
Billy Crystal	2	March 17, 1984	May 12, 1984
Pete Davidson	1	October 14, 2023	
Robert Downey Jr.	1	November 16, 1996	
Jimmy Fallon	3	December 17, 2011	April 15, 2017
Chris Farley	1	October 25, 1997	
Will Ferrell	6	May 14, 2005	May 16, 2026
Tina Fey	6	February 23, 2008	May 19, 2018
Will Forte	1	January 22, 2022	
Bill Hader	2	October 11, 2014	March 17, 2018
Phil Hartman	2	March 23, 1996	November 23, 1996
Julia Louis-Dreyfus	3	May 13, 2006	April 16, 2016
Jon Lovitz	1	November 8, 1997	
Norm Macdonald	1	October 23, 1999	
Michael McKean	1	November 3, 1984	
Kate McKinnon	1	December 16, 2023	
Seth Meyers	1	October 13, 2018	
Tracy Morgan	2	March 14, 2009	October 17, 2015
Eddie Murphy	3	December 11, 1982	December 21, 2019
Bill Murray	5	March 7, 1981	February 20, 1999
Mike Myers	1	March 22, 1997	
Don Novello	2	January 14, 1984	May 12, 1984
Amy Poehler	3	September 25, 2010	October 11, 2025
Chris Rock	4	November 2, 1996	December 14, 2024
Maya Rudolph	3	February 18, 2012	May 11, 2024
Andy Samberg	1	May 17, 2014	
Adam Sandler	1	May 4, 2019	
Paul Shaffer	1	January 31, 1987	
Molly Shannon	2	May 12, 2007	April 8, 2023
Martin Short	5	December 6, 1986	December 21, 2024
Sarah Silverman	1	October 4, 2014	
David Spade	2	November 7, 1998	March 12, 2005
Jason Sudeikis	1	October 23, 2021	
Ben Stiller	2	October 24, 1998	October 8, 2011
Damon Wayans	1	April 8, 1995	
Kristen Wiig	5	May 11, 2013	April 6, 2024

== Deceased cast members ==
Several SNL cast members have died over the years, many of them meeting relatively untimely deaths. This has given rise to a superstition known as the "Saturday Night Live Curse".

Deceased Saturday Night Live cast members
Name	Age	Death date	Cause of death
John Belushi	33	March 5, 1982	Belushi died of a drug overdose from a speedball injection (cocaine and heroin). His death led to the conviction of Cathy Smith for administering the fatal injection.
Gilda Radner	42	May 20, 1989	Radner died from ovarian cancer. She was originally scheduled to host the 13th season finale, a first for a former female cast member. However, SNL was put on a production hiatus due to the 1988 Writers Guild of America strike. Radner's health worsened the following year. Before the 14th season finale was broadcast, news broke of Radner's death. In lieu of the opening monologue Steve Martin, visibly shaken, introduced a replay of the "Dancing in the Dark" sketch he and Radner had performed in a 1978 episode; her ex-husband G. E. Smith performed a musical tribute to Radner with the SNL Band.
Danitra Vance	40	August 21, 1994	Vance died of breast cancer, which had returned after a remission three years earlier.
Michael O'Donoghue	54	November 8, 1994	O'Donoghue died from cerebral hemorrhage after suffering from severe chronic migraine headaches for most of his life. Bill Murray honored O'Donoghue's memory in an appearance on a 20th season episode (hosted by Sarah Jessica Parker with musical guest R.E.M.) by replaying his sketch "Mr. Mike's Least Loved Bedtime Stories: The Soiled Kimono" from 1977.
Chris Farley	33	December 18, 1997	Influenced by Belushi, Farley died of a drug overdose from a speedball injection. His death occurred less than two months after he returned to host SNL, which turned out to be his final television appearance.
Phil Hartman	49	May 28, 1998	Hartman was murdered by his wife, Brynn, while he slept in his Encino, California home. Before doing so, Brynn had allegedly consumed a combination of cocaine, alcohol, and the antidepressant drug Zoloft, and then died by suicide. During SNL's 25th anniversary special in 1999, several of Hartman's peers honored his memory by replaying his sketch "Love Is a Dream" from 1988.
Charles Rocket	56	October 7, 2005	Rocket was found dead in his Canterbury, Connecticut backyard. Local police concluded his death a suicide; Rocket had allegedly killed himself by slashing his throat with a box cutter.
Tom Davis	59	July 19, 2012	Davis died of throat and neck cancer.
Jan Hooks	57	October 9, 2014	Hooks died after battling throat cancer for several months. Two days after her death, Hooks was given a tribute on SNL during the third episode of its 40th season, in which a sketch she had filmed with Hartman, "Love Is a Dream", was re-aired.
George Coe	86	July 18, 2015	Coe died after a long illness, which included a 20 year battle with lymphoma.
Tony Rosato	62	July 10, 2017	Rosato died of a heart attack.
Norm Macdonald	61	September 14, 2021	Macdonald died from complications due to acute leukemia.
Peter Aykroyd	65	November 6, 2021	Aykroyd died from sepsis caused by an untreated abdominal hernia.
Gilbert Gottfried	67	April 12, 2022	Gottfried died from recurrent ventricular tachycardia, complicated by type II myotonic dystrophy.
Dan Vitale	65	May 6, 2022	Vitale died of undisclosed causes.

== See also ==
- Saturday Night Live Band
- List of Saturday Night Live guests
- List of Saturday Night Live writers
