= Recurring Saturday Night Live characters and sketches introduced 1977–78 =

The following is a list of recurring Saturday Night Live characters and sketches introduced between September 24, 1977, and May 20, 1978, the third season of SNL.

== The Festrunk Brothers ("Two Wild and Crazy Guys!") ==
The Festrunk Brothers was a Dan Aykroyd and Steve Martin sketch which debuted on September 24, 1977. The Festrunks, Yortuk (Aykroyd) and Georg (Martin), were two brothers who had emigrated from Czechoslovakia to the United States. Culturally inept, they typically had difficulty impressing American women ("swinging foxes") played by Jane Curtin, Laraine Newman, and Gilda Radner. The sketch popularized the catchphrase "We are two wild and crazy guys!".

Appearances

Season	Episode	Host	Notes
3	September 24, 1977	Steve Martin	
3	January 21, 1978	Steve Martin	
3	April 22, 1978	Steve Martin	
4	November 4, 1978	Steve Martin	
24	September 26, 1998	Cameron Diaz	Roxbury Guys sketch
38	March 9, 2013	Justin Timberlake	Dating Game Show

== The Franken and Davis Show ==
SNL writing partners Al Franken and Tom Davis hosted their own segment on which they would appear onstage as a comedy team similar to Rowan and Martin, with Davis generally as the straight man and Franken as his self-obsessed, sometimes dimwitted sidekick. They would also perform skits within the context of the segment. The Franken and Davis Show was often a late addition to the broadcast as a time filler if the show was running short. Their best-known skit consisted of Davis appearing in normal dress, while Franken appeared in a flowing garment, with a shaved head and a pony tail and announced he was becoming a Hare Krishna. Davis responded by cutting off the ponytail, angering Franken who said, "Now people will think I'm a Buddhist!" Debuted September 24, 1977.

Aside from The Franken and Davis Show, the two have made several appearances, either separately or as a team, in many SNL sketches throughout the years. They also appear together in the film Trading Places as a pair of bumbling baggage handlers. Al Franken later hosted his own talk show on which Tom Davis has made numerous appearances. Franken, who in 2009 became a U.S. Senator from Minnesota, is probably best known as a performer for his character Stuart Smalley, and for his on-air proposal at the end of the 1970s that the 1980s be known as "The Al Franken Decade."

Appearances

Season	Episode	Host	Notes
3	September 24, 1977	Steve Martin	
3	November 19, 1977	Buck Henry	
3	December 17, 1977	Miskel Spillman	
3	February 25, 1978	O. J. Simpson	
3	May 20, 1978	Buck Henry	
4	October 21, 1978	Frank Zappa	
4	January 21, 1979	Michael Palin	
4	March 17, 1979	Margot Kidder	
4	May 26, 1979	Buck Henry	
5	April 5, 1980	Richard Benjamin, Paula Prentiss	

== The Ex-Police ==
Joe and his ex-partner Bob (Dan Aykroyd and Bill Murray) are two cops that were kicked off the force (apparently for being intrusive bigots) that harass the people that live in their apartment building for not living up to their arch-conservative standards (a man and a woman living together without being married, an allegedly lesbian couple, etc.) with disastrous results. Debuted October 15, 1977.

Appearances

Season	Episode	Host	Notes
3	October 15, 1977	Hugh Hefner	
3	January 28, 1978	Robert Klein	
4	February 10, 1979	Cicely Tyson	

== Judy Miller ==
A Gilda Radner character. Judy Miller is a highly energetic school girl playing by herself, pretending she is hosting her own variety talk show. Debuted October 29, 1977.

== Joan Face ==
A Jane Curtin character, a talk show host and moderator. She hosted four of the five "Consumer Probe" and "On The Spot" sketches, three of the four "What If?" sketches (once billed as "Joan Cage"), the two "More Things to Worry About" sketches with Buck Henry, "Not For Transsexuals Only", and "Heavy Sarcasm". Debuted October 29, 1977, in "Consumer Probe" opposite Irwin Mainway.

== Roseanne Roseannadanna ==
A Gilda Radner character offering brash, tactless opinions on Weekend Update. Debuted October 29, 1977 in a fake commercial called "Hire The Incompetent", where she protested being fired from a fast food restaurant because her hair kept falling into the hamburgers on a grill.

Appearances

Season	Episode	Host	Notes
3	January 21, 1978	Steve Martin	
3	January 28, 1978	Robert Klein	
3	February 25, 1978	O. J. Simpson	
3	March 18, 1978	Jill Clayburgh	
3	April 15, 1978	Michael Sarrazin	
3	May 13, 1978	Richard Dreyfuss	
4	October 7, 1978	The Rolling Stones	
4	November 18, 1978	Carrie Fisher	
4	December 16, 1978	Elliott Gould	
4	February 24, 1979	Kate Jackson	
4	April 7, 1979	Richard Benjamin	
4	May 26, 1979	Buck Henry	
5	October 20, 1979	Eric Idle	
5	December 22, 1979	Ted Knight	
5	March 15, 1980	none	
5	May 24, 1980	Buck Henry	

== What if? ==
A talk show sendup that dramatized counterfactual historical situations. Debuted January 21, 1978.

=== Episodes featuring What If? ===
- January 21, 1978 (Season 3, Episode 9), "What if Napoleon Had a B-52 Bomber?", hosted by Joan Face (as "Joan Cage")
- November 4, 1978 (Season 4, Episode 4), "What if Eleanor Roosevelt Could Fly?"
- January 27, 1979 (Season 4, Episode 10), "What if Superman Had Landed in Nazi Germany?", hosted by Joan Face
- February 23, 1980 (Season 5, Episode 12), "What if Spartacus Had a Piper Cub?", hosted by Joan Face

== Olympia Café ("Cheeseburger, Cheeseburger") ==
John Belushi is the Greek chef of a greasy spoon diner. Debuted January 28, 1978.

Appearances

Season	Episode	Host	Notes
3	January 28, 1978	Robert Klein	
3	March 18, 1978	Jill Clayburgh	
3	May 20, 1978	Buck Henry	
4	October 7, 1978	The Rolling Stones	
4	December 2, 1978	Walter Matthau	
4	May 26, 1979	Buck Henry	

== The Nerds (Lisa Loopner) ==
Gilda Radner is Lisa Loopner; Bill Murray is Todd DiLaMuca; Jane Curtin is Lisa's mother. Debuted January 28, 1978.

Appearances

Season	Episode	Host	Notes
3	January 28, 1978	Robert Klein	Nerd Rock
3	March 11, 1978	Art Garfunkel	Looks at Books
3	April 8, 1978	Michael Palin	Music Lesson
3	April 22, 1978	Steve Martin	Science Fair
3	May 20, 1978	Buck Henry	Prom Night
4	October 7, 1978	The Rolling Stones	The Norge (Repairman)
4	November 4, 1978	Steve Martin	Lisa at the Hospital
4	January 27, 1979	Michael Palin	Another Music Lesson
4	February 24, 1979	Kate Jackson	Nerds and the Nurse
4	April 7, 1979	Richard Benjamin	Nerds and Milt
5	November 10, 1979	Buck Henry	Matchmaker Nerds
5	December 22, 1979	Ted Knight	Nativity Scene
5	March 15, 1980	none	Todd's Campaign

== Lester Crackfield ==
Al Franken is a coal miner. Debuted February 18, 1978.

== Point/Counterpoint ==
A Weekend Update segment, parodying a feature of 60 Minutes, in which Dan Aykroyd and Jane Curtin debate a current events topic. Aykroyd's argument typically begins with "Jane, you ignorant slut." Debuted March 25, 1978.

Appearances

Season	Episode	Host	Notes
3	March 25, 1978	Christopher Lee	
3	April 15, 1978	Michael Sarrazin	
3	April 22, 1978	Steve Martin	
3	May 20, 1978	Buck Henry	
4	October 7, 1978	The Rolling Stones	with Bill Murray
4	October 21, 1978	Frank Zappa	
4	November 11, 1978	Buck Henry	
4	December 16, 1978	Elliott Gould	
4	February 17, 1979	Ricky Nelson	
4	March 17, 1979	Margot Kidder	
4	May 19, 1979	Maureen Stapleton	

== The Blues Brothers ==
Dan Aykroyd and John Belushi are an American blues and soul revivalist band. Debuted April 22, 1978.

== Theodoric of York, Medieval Barber ==
A Steve Martin sketch. Debuted April 22, 1978.

== Father Guido Sarducci ==
Don Novello plays a chain-smoking, gossiping priest. Debuted May 13, 1978.

Appearances

Season	Episode	Host	Notes
3	May 13, 1978	Richard Dreyfuss	"Special Guest" Appearance
4	October 21, 1978	Frank Zappa	
4	November 18, 1978	Carrie Fisher	
4	December 9, 1978	Eric Idle	
4	January 27, 1979	Michael Palin	
4	February 24, 1979	Kate Jackson	
4	March 17, 1979	Margot Kidder	
4	May 12, 1979	Michael Palin	
5	October 13, 1979	Steve Martin	
5	November 10, 1979	Buck Henry	
5	December 15, 1979	Martin Sheen	
5	January 26, 1980	Teri Garr	
5	February 16, 1980	Elliott Gould	Outside Richard Nixon's New York Apartment
5	March 8, 1980	Rodney Dangerfield	
5	April 12, 1980	Burt Reynolds	
5	May 17, 1980	Steve Martin	Live from London with Paul McCartney
7	December 12, 1981	Bill Murray	
9	January 14, 1984	Father Guido Sarducci	
9	May 12, 1984	Ed Koch, Betty Thomas, Father Guido Sarducci, Edwin Newman, Billy Crystal	
11	November 9, 1985	Madonna	
11	November 23, 1985	Pee-wee Herman	
11	December 21, 1985	Teri Garr	
11	May 24, 1986	Anjelica Huston, Billy Martin	
18	February 20, 1993	Bill Murray	
21	October 7, 1995	Chevy Chase	

Preceded by Recurring Saturday Night Live characters and sketches introduced 1976–1977	Recurring Saturday Night Live characters and sketches (listed chronologically)	Succeeded by Recurring Saturday Night Live characters and sketches introduced 1978–1979
