= Saturday Night Live season 3 =

Saturday Night Live
- Season 3
- Starring: Dan Aykroyd; John Belushi; Jane Curtin; Garrett Morris; Bill Murray; Laraine Newman; Gilda Radner
- No. of episodes: 20

Release
- Original network: NBC
- Original release: September 24, 1977 – May 20, 1978

Season chronology
- ← Previous season 2 Next → season 4

The third season of Saturday Night Live, an American sketch comedy series, originally aired in the United States on NBC between September 24, 1977, and May 20, 1978.

The DVD set of the entire season was released on May 13, 2008.

== Cast ==
At the start of the season, Dan Aykroyd joined Jane Curtin as an anchor for Weekend Update, becoming the first Weekend Update anchor team. This would be the final season that the cast was called "The Not Ready for Primetime Players".

=== Cast ===
The Not Ready for Prime Time Players

- **Dan Aykroyd**
- John Belushi
- **Jane Curtin**
- Garrett Morris
- Bill Murray
- Laraine Newman
- Gilda Radner

bold denotes Weekend Update anchor

== Behind the scenes ==
In the "Anyone Can Host" episode—for which a contest found a non-celebrity to host the show—the musical guest, Elvis Costello, halted his band, the Attractions, seven seconds into the song "Less Than Zero", launching into "Radio Radio", an as-yet unreleased song critical of mainstream broadcasting. (The Sex Pistols were originally booked to appear on the show, but they canceled their engagement due to money restrictions.) The change angered Lorne Michaels, and Costello would not be invited back to the show until 1989.

Chevy Chase hosted during the season, making him the first cast member to host after leaving the show. Right before the curtain call, a heated argument broke out backstage between Chase and relatively new cast member Bill Murray. After several insults were exchanged (including Chase mocking Murray's acne-scarred skin and Murray calling Chase a "medium talent"), the two men struck each other. Although by most accounts the altercation had been at least partially instigated by John Belushi, he was the one (along with Dan Aykroyd) who separated Murray and Chase moments before the entire cast regrouped in front of the live cameras. Before being banned from hosting altogether in 1997, Chase hosted the show several times throughout its history, though he was extremely unpopular with the cast and crew and regularly disagreed with them.

Comedy team/SNL writers Al Franken and Tom Davis were billed as special guests for five episodes this season, in which they performed their own segment. They were announced by Don Pardo in the opening credits as "the comedy team of Franken and Davis." Michael O'Donoghue was credited as a special guest for two episodes under the name of his character "Mr. Mike," while new writer Don Novello was credited as a special guest for one episode as "Father Guido Sarducci."

== Writers ==
Talent coordinator/extra Neil Levy (who is the cousin of producer Lorne Michaels) was officially added to the writing staff. This was his only season as a writer, but stayed with the staff for the next several seasons.

Brian Doyle-Murray (Bill's brother) and Don Novello (best known for his character Father Guido Sarducci) joined the writing staff midway through the season on January 21, 1978.

This season's writers were Dan Aykroyd, Anne Beatts, Tom Davis, Jim Downey, Brian Doyle-Murray, Al Franken, Neil Levy, Lorne Michaels, Don Novello, Herb Sargent, Tom Schiller, Rosie Shuster, Marilyn Suzanne Miller and Alan Zweibel.

This was initially the last season for writers Michael O'Donoghue and Marilyn Suzanne Miller (both of whom had been writing for the show since its inception in 1975), as they would leave after three years, but both would return to the writing staff in later years.

== Episodes ==
No. overall	No. in season	Host	Musical guest(s)	Original release date
47	1	Steve Martin	Jackson Browne	September 24, 1977
Jackson Browne performs "Running on Empty" and "The Pretender".; Special Guest: Franken and Davis; First appearance of the Festrunk Brothers.; John Belushi performs as Roy Orbison.; Dan Aykroyd's first episode sans moustache and as Weekend Update co-anchor, alongside Jane Curtin.; New opening sequence debuts with credits displayed on the Times Square Jumbotron.; New Weekend Update set debuts featuring a blue chroma key background with the Update logo.; Change to Saturday Night Live becomes permanent beginning with this episode.
48	2	Madeline Kahn	Taj Mahal	October 8, 1977
Taj Mahal performs "Queen Bee".; Special Guest: Australian comedian Barry Humphries as his character Dame Edna Everage.; Schiller's Reel, a series of short films made by writer Tom Schiller makes its first appearance. The first Schiller's Reel film was "The Acid Generation: Where Are They Now?"; The "NBC Dancing N", a season 3 running gag, makes its first appearance.; This episode debuts the "Anyone Can Host" contest.
49	3	Hugh Hefner	Libby Titus	October 15, 1977
Libby Titus performs "Fool That I Am".; Special Guest: Andy Kaufman
50	4	Charles Grodin	Paul Simon	October 29, 1977
Paul Simon performs "Slip Slidin' Away" and "You're Kind" (a song from Still Crazy After All These Years), accompanied on both songs by harmonica player Toots Thielemans and a backing band. The first song was performed with The Persuasions.; A running gag throughout the episode involves Grodin breaking character and ruining sketches, as if he missed the dress rehearsal. While many speculated this was genuine and Grodin was banned from hosting, Grodin later confirmed that it was all part of the act. Regardless, Grodin would never host again.; One sketch features Simon and Grodin attempting to sing "The Sound of Silence", with Grodin wearing an Art Garfunkel wig. After several aborted starts (with Grodin singing off-key and forgetting the lyrics), Simon walks off the stage. Grodin then proceeds to sing a verse of "Bridge Over Troubled Water", after which the real Art Garfunkel walks on stage and asks Grodin to take off the wig.; Roseanne Roseannadanna made her debut in this episode's "Hire the Incompetent" sketch.; New title sequence debuts showing the logo in a new typeface and the cast individually standing in front of the Times Square Jumbotron.; First appearance of Judy Miller.; Grodin makes an appearance in the audience right after the football sketch with the caption "THIS WEEK'S HOST!"
51	5	Ray Charles	Ray Charles	November 12, 1977
Ray Charles performs "I Can See Clearly Now," "What'd I Say," "Oh! What a Beautiful Mornin'" and a medley of "I Got a Woman," "I Believe to My Soul," "Them That Got" and "Hit the Road Jack".; Special Guest: Franklyn Ajaye; Buck Henry makes an uncredited guest appearance as himself to plug the next episode he hosts and tease the "Anyone Can Host" contest.; Ray Charles led the band, cast and crew in a jam during the closing credits.
52	6	Buck Henry	Leon Redbone	November 19, 1977
Leon Redbone performs "Champagne Charlie" and "Please Don't Talk about Me When I'm Gone".; Special Guest: Franken and Davis; Henry uses his monologue to introduce the five finalists in the "Anyone Can Host" contest. The five finalists are then featured sporadically throughout the episode, including an appearance in a film by Gary Weis.; In a sketch, John Belushi plays himself as a retired athlete, endorsing "Little Chocolate Donuts," a parody of Caitlyn Jenner's Wheaties ad. The voice over for the commercial while Belushi is running is done by sportscaster Marv Albert.; A film by Tom Schiller was featured.; With this episode, Henry becomes the first to host five times.
53	7	Mary Kay Place	Willie Nelson	December 10, 1977
Willie Nelson performs "Blue Eyes Crying in the Rain", "Whiskey River" and "Something to Brag About". The last song was performed as a duet with Mary Kay Place.; Special Guest: Andy Kaufman; Contains the classic Marilyn Suzanne Miller penned sketch, "Married in a Minute!"; The Weekend Update set is slightly modified to include an image screen, before, the images were shown on the blue chroma key background.
54	8	Miskel Spillman	Elvis Costello	December 17, 1977
Elvis Costello performs "Watching the Detectives" and was scheduled to perform "Less Than Zero" but halted his band the Attractions seven seconds into the song, launching into "Radio Radio", an as-yet unreleased song critical of mainstream broadcasting.; Miskel Spillman was the winner of SNL's "Anyone Can Host" contest.; Special Guests: Franken and Davis, Mr. Mike; Al Franken's parents, Joseph and Phoebe, appear in the "Franken and Davis Show" sketch.; Emily Litella makes her final regular appearance as Weekend Update's consumer affairs correspondent.; The Sex Pistols were originally scheduled to perform as announced by Don Pardo on the previous show during the closing credits.; Buck Henry makes a cameo appearance during the cold open and monologue (trying to snatch the bowl of fruit away held by Spillman, only to have his hands slapped) and during the "Sartresky and Hutch" sketch.
55	9	Steve Martin	Randy Newman, The Nitty Gritty Dirt Band	January 21, 1978
Randy Newman performs "Short People" and "Rider in the Rain". Members of The Nitty Gritty Dirt Band perform backing vocals during Newman's set. The Nitty Gritty Dirt Band, in turn, performs "On the Loose" and "White Russia". (Martin accompanied them on banjo for the latter song.); Steve Martin announces that a snowstorm the day before caused limited rehearsals.; Roseanne Roseannadanna makes her Weekend Update debut in this episode replacing Emily Litella as consumer affairs correspondent.; First appearance of the What if? sketch. (What if Napoleon had a B-17 bomber?)
56	10	Robert Klein	Bonnie Raitt	January 28, 1978
Bonnie Raitt performs "Give It Up or Let Me Go" and "Runaway". Klein joined Raitt on harmonica on the former song.; The cold open features Paul Shaffer as Don Kirshner, Mr. Mike, and Garrett Morris in full drag as Tina Turner.; Bill Murray's "Nick Winters" lounge singer performs "Star Wars, nothing but Star Wars ...".; Paul Shaffer appears as Nick the Lounge Singer's pianist.; First appearance of the Olympia Cafe sketch, during which the word "cheeseburger" is said 80 times.; First appearance of The Nerds sketch.; Because of the then-recent crash of the highly radioactive Russian satellite Kosmos 954 (which took place just 4 days earlier), this episode features a running gag about the radioactive debris having created giant mutant lobsters heading for the U.S. east coast which saw them attack 30 Rockefeller Plaza at the show's end.; Chevy Chase does the lobster roars as stated in the closing credits.
57	11	Chevy Chase	Billy Joel	February 18, 1978
Billy Joel performs "Only the Good Die Young" and "Just the Way You Are". When introducing Joel's first performance, Chevy Chase notes that Joel missed his high school reunion to perform on SNL.; Chevy Chase becomes the first former cast member to come back and host with this episode.; Chase appeared on Weekend Update as "senior anchorperson".; The season 1 and 2 opening title sequence is used for this episode.
58	12	O. J. Simpson	Ashford and Simpson	February 25, 1978
Ashford and Simpson perform "Don't Cost You Nothing" and "So, So Satisfied".; Special Guest: Franken and Davis; The title sequence shows new footage of the cast (except Dan Aykroyd and Gilda Radner) without the Jumbotron in the background.; Every cast member, as well as Don Novello and O.J. Simpson, are featured in Samurai Night Fever, a parody of Saturday Night Fever. John Belushi dances to The Bee Gees' Stayin' Alive.
59	13	Art Garfunkel	Stephen Bishop	March 11, 1978
Stephen Bishop performs "On and On" and Art Garfunkel performs "Wonderful World" with Stephen Bishop on backup, "Crying in My Sleep" and a medley of "All I Know"/"Scarborough Fair".; Special Guest: Andy Kaufman; This episode features the short film, Don't Look Back in Anger, in which an aged John Belushi visits the graves of the "Not Ready for Primetime Players" cast and claims he's the last living member. (The sketch is now seen as ironic due to Belushi's being the first of the original cast to die.)
60	14	Jill Clayburgh	Eddie Money	March 18, 1978
Eddie Money performs "Two Tickets to Paradise" and "Baby Hold On".
61	15	Christopher Lee	Meat Loaf	March 25, 1978
Meat Loaf performs "All Revved Up with No Place to Go" and "Two Out of Three Ain't Bad".; Special Guest: Richard Belzer. He performs stand-up, including Muzak versions of Rolling Stones hits; he does an impersonation of Mick Jagger with the SNL band as backup.; John Belushi was billed as Kevin Scott for this episode.; On "Weekend Update", the Writers Guild strikes against Sesame Street ("picket" "scab" "don't, it might get infected") and the"Point/Counterpoint" segment is introduced.; A Gary Weis short film titled "Cold as Ice" features an uncredited Stacy Keach being repeatedly stabbed with scissors and a gun and eventually shot with a shotgun, all in slow-motion by an unnamed blonde to the tune of the Foreigner song of the same name.; Bill Murray begins his annual Oscar picks.; Mr. Bill goes to the circus.; According to Murray during Weekend Update, John Travolta was set to host an episode but canceled at the last minute.
62	16	Michael Palin	Eugene Record	April 8, 1978
Eugene Record performs "Have You Seen Her" and "Trying to Get to You".; In the opening monologue, Michael Palin plays his manager who ends up stuffing live cats down his trousers; one of the cats defecates freely all over his arm. Palin, with only a one-minute costume change afterward, performed the RC Priest and Very Famous Man (Trunk Escape) sketches with feces still on his clothes.; Mr. Bill pays his taxes.; During Weekend Update, John Belushi does an editorial about Radio City Music Hall.
63	17	Michael Sarrazin	Keith Jarrett	April 15, 1978
Keith Jarrett performs "Country" and "My Song." Gravity performed "Tuba City Gitback."; This episode features a short black and white film, La Dolce Gilda.
64	18	Steve Martin	The Blues Brothers	April 22, 1978
The Blues Brothers perform "I Don't Know".; The cold opening features Paul Shaffer as Don Kirshner introducing The Blues Brothers singing "Hey Bartender".; Sketches include the Czech brothers, The classic Franken and Davis skit, "Theodoric of York, Medieval Barber" a Martin and Radner dance sketch (Written by Miller), a performance of "King Tut," a Gary Weis film with ballet dancers and breakdancers and "Nerds at the Science Fair".; This episode was nominated for an Emmy Award and was later selected as TV Guide's #12 Top TV Episode of all time.
65	19	Richard Dreyfuss	Jimmy Buffett, Gary Tigerman	May 13, 1978
Jimmy Buffett performs "Son of a Son of a Sailor" and Gary Tigerman performs "White Oaxacan Moon".; First appearance of Father Guido Sarducci (Don Novello). Novello is credited as a special guest in the opening, under Sarducci's name.; Novello performs in crutches, having injured himself in the hockey sketch in the Michael Sarrazin episode. Also Jimmy Buffett performs in a cast, having broken his leg.; Paul Shaffer appears as lounge singer Nick Winter's piano player and as Dreyfuss' piano player, as Dreyfuss sings "Seduced" by Gary Tigerman.; John Belushi joins Dreyfuss on stage and, as part of the monologue, attempts to help Dreyfuss with the lines of his Shakespeare soliloquy (suggesting that he use the cue cards since he is not used to being on television) and then angrily mocks and argues with him saying he did not deserve the Oscar he had received that year (over Richard Burton).; Twice in the episode, Dreyfuss hears the Jaws theme.; During the "Cone Encounters of the Third Kind" sketch, Dreyfuss (reprising his role as Roy Neary from his 1977 film Close Encounters of the Third Kind) accidentally and briefly speaks in the Coneheads tone.; During the closing credits, Dreyfuss is attacked by the Land Shark.
66	20	Buck Henry	Sun Ra	May 20, 1978
Sun Ra performs a medley including "Space Is the Place," "The Sound Mirror" and "Watusa".; Special Guests: Mr. Mike, Franken and Davis; Final episode where the cast was referred to as "The Not Ready for Primetime Players".; Dan Aykroyd's final episode as Weekend Update co-anchor.; Final episode with Weekend Update's blue chroma key set.; Final episode to feature audience caption bumpers

== Home media ==
Season 3 was released on DVD May 13, 2008.
