= Saturday Night Live season 4 =

Saturday Night Live
- Season 4
- Starring: Dan Aykroyd; John Belushi; Jane Curtin; Garrett Morris; Bill Murray; Laraine Newman; Gilda Radner
- No. of episodes: 20

Release
- Original network: NBC
- Original release: October 7, 1978 – May 26, 1979

Season chronology
- ← Previous season 3 Next → season 5

The fourth season of Saturday Night Live, an American sketch comedy series, originally aired in the United States on NBC between October 7, 1978, and May 26, 1979.

The season 4 DVD was released on December 2, 2008.

== Cast ==
The entire cast from the previous season returned. The only change was Bill Murray's joining Jane Curtin as co-anchor for Weekend Update, replacing Dan Aykroyd. This would be the final season for Dan Aykroyd and John Belushi as cast members (who both left to work on SNL's first film, The Blues Brothers).

- Dan Aykroyd
- John Belushi
- **Jane Curtin**
- Garrett Morris
- **Bill Murray**
- Laraine Newman
- Gilda Radner

bold denotes Weekend Update anchor

== Writers ==
Walter Williams, creator of the Mr. Bill shorts, joined the writing staff.

This season's writers were Dan Aykroyd, Anne Beatts, Tom Davis, Jim Downey, Brian Doyle-Murray, Al Franken, Brian McConnachie, Lorne Michaels, Don Novello, Herb Sargent, Tom Schiller, Rosie Shuster, Walter Williams and Alan Zweibel.

Members of the writing staff were credited as "special guests" in the opening montage in episodes where they performed a segment of their own material. Al Franken and Tom Davis, usually billed as "the comedy team of Franken and Davis", and Don Novello, credited as "and a special report from Father Guido Sarducci," appeared throughout the season, with former/original writer Michael O'Donoghue returning for the finale as a special guest, credited as "impressionist Michael O'Donoghue." Novello did seven appearances as Sarducci, while Franken and Davis did four appearances.

== Episodes ==
No. overall	No. in season	Host	Musical guest(s)	Original release date
67	1	The Rolling Stones	The Rolling Stones	October 7, 1978
The Rolling Stones perform "Beast of Burden", "Respectable" and "Shattered". All were from the June 1978 album Some Girls.; Two sketches feature Rolling Stones members: the Tomorrow Show parody, in which Tom Snyder (Dan Aykroyd) interviews Mick Jagger; and the Olympia Cafe sketch, which features Charlie Watts and Ron Wood.; The monologue is delivered by the then-Mayor of New York City Ed Koch.; Bill Murray's first episode as Weekend Update co-anchor, alongside Jane Curtin.; A "Schiller's Reel" film called "Sushi by the Pool", features Desi Arnaz Jr., Carrie Fisher and Steven Keats with special guest Hal Holbrook.; Starting with this episode, the cast is no longer referred to as "The Not Ready for Primetime Players".
68	2	Fred Willard	Devo	October 14, 1978
Devo perform two songs from their July 1978 debut album Q: Are We Not Men? A: We Are Devo!: a cover of the Rolling Stones' "(I Can't Get No) Satisfaction" and "Jocko Homo"; the performance of the latter is preceded by an excerpt from the band's short film, The Truth About De-Evolution.; Mr. Bill goes to New York.; NBC re-aired the episode on May 23, 2020 as a tribute to Willard, who had died the week before.
69	3	Frank Zappa	Frank Zappa	October 21, 1978
Frank Zappa and his band perform "Dancin' Fool" from the 1979 album Sheik Yerbouti, "The Meek Shall Inherit Nothing" from the 1981 album You Are What You Is and "Rollo", which was cut from the 1974 album Apostrophe (') and would remain unreleased until 2006's Imaginary Diseases.; Special Guests: Father Guido Sarducci, Franken and Davis; During Zappa's performance of "Rollo", John Belushi, in character as Samurai Futaba, briefly appears on stage with the group. Singing into a microphone duct taped to the body of an electric guitar, Belushi carries out a call and response bit with the band.; Zappa was unpopular with the cast and crew, possibly in part because their lax views on drug and alcohol consumption did not mesh with his anti-drug stance. This is highlighted in the sketch "Night on Freak Mountain", which also features Paul Shaffer as Don Kirshner. Throughout the episode, Zappa regularly mugs for the camera and frequently notes to the audience that he is reading from cue cards.; Mr. Bill Moves In.
70	4	Steve Martin	Van Morrison	November 4, 1978
Van Morrison performs two songs from his September 1978 release Wavelength: the title track and "Kingdom Hall".; Final appearance of the Festrunk Brothers.; The last sketch was cut short. When the show closes, Steve Martin announces there were technical problems and that the sketch would resume the next time he hosted.; This is Martin's sixth time as host.
71	5	Buck Henry	Grateful Dead	November 11, 1978
The Grateful Dead performs "Casey Jones" and "I Need a Miracle/Good Lovin'" medley.; John Belushi as Elizabeth Taylor chokes on chicken.; First appearance of "Uncle Roy" sketch.; "Samurai Optometrist" sketch.; First appearance of "Chico Escuela".; Buck Henry's seventh time as host.; Grateful Dead drummer Bill Kreutzmann makes a non-verbal cameo appearance during the "Nick Sands, the Lounge Singer" skit.
72	6	Carrie Fisher	The Blues Brothers	November 18, 1978
The Blues Brothers open the show with "Soul Man", and perform a medley of "Got Everything I Need, Almost" and "'B' Movie Box Car Blues".; Special Guest: Father Guido Sarducci; Writers Al Franken, Tom Davis, Alan Zweibel, Brian Doyle-Murray, and future cast member Harry Shearer appear in the Beach Blanket sketch.; Mr. Bill Goes Fishing.
73	7	Walter Matthau	Garrett Morris	December 2, 1978
There is no billed musical guest for this episode. At host Walter Matthau's request, Garrett Morris performs Mozart's "Dalla sua pace" ("On her peace"), an aria from Don Giovanni.; George Coe appears in the Epoxy-Dent commercial parody.; Pepsi is replaced with Coke in the Olympia Cafe sketch.; Mr. Bill Is Late.; This episode features the last appearance of the Bees in a sketch called the Bad News Bees. In the skit, Coach Buttermaker (Matthau reprising his role from the 1976 film The Bad News Bears, albeit in a bee costume) tries to get his team to stop "buzzing off"
74	8	Eric Idle	Kate Bush	December 9, 1978
Kate Bush (in her only US appearance to date) performs "The Man with the Child in His Eyes" and "Them Heavy People".; Special Guest: Father Guido Sarducci; The sketch "What Do You?", written by Idle, originally appeared on Monty Python's Previous Record.; Dan Aykroyd portrays Julia Child cutting her finger and bleeding uncontrollably.; Candy Slice performs "If You Look Close".; Idle's third time as host.
75	9	Elliott Gould	Peter Tosh; Mick Jagger	December 16, 1978
Peter Tosh and Mick Jagger perform "(You Gotta Walk And) Don't Look Back", and Tosh performs "Bush Doctor".; Special Guests: Bob and Ray; "Mommie Dearest" sketch.; "Point/Counterpoint" regarding relations with China.; Elliott Gould (his 4th time hosting) and Garrett Morris sing "It's Christmas Time in Harlem" during the opening monologue, accompanied by Paul Shaffer.
76	10	Michael Palin	The Doobie Brothers	January 27, 1979
The Doobie Brothers perform "What a Fool Believes" and "Takin' It to the Streets".; Special Guests: Father Guido Sarducci, Franken and Davis; Michael Palin (2nd time hosting) reprises his sleazy music teacher character Mr. Brighton for another sketch with The Nerds.; Dickens' "Miles Cowperthwaite", Part 1.; Mr Bill Goes to Court.
77	11	Cicely Tyson	Talking Heads	February 10, 1979
Garrett Morris, dressed as Cicely Tyson, opens the monologue, then is interrupted by the real Tyson; together they then discuss Morris' contract under which he supposedly plays all character parts "darker than Tony Orlando."; Talking Heads perform "Take Me to the River" and "Artists Only" from their album More Songs About Buildings and Food.; Final appearance of Emily Litella
78	12	Ricky Nelson	Judy Collins	February 17, 1979
Judy Collins performs "Hard Times for Lovers".; Ricky Nelson performs a medley of his classic hits from the 1950s, "Hello Mary Lou", "Travelin' Man" and "Fools Rush In" for the monologue; he later performs his version of "Dream Lover".; Twilight Zone sketch features classic TV shows Leave it to Beaver, Father Knows Best, Make Room for Daddy and I Love Lucy.; Candy Slice performs in Rock Against Yeast with Paul Shaffer playing Don Kirshner and the drummer of her band.
79	13	Kate Jackson	Delbert McClinton	February 24, 1979
McClinton performs "B Movie Boxcar Blues" and "I'm Talking About You".; Special Guests: Andy Kaufman, Father Guido Sarducci; A running gag throughout the show is Fred Silverman trying to sabotage NBC's line-up.; Brian Doyle-Murray is one of the people taking a tour during the opening monologue.; Kate Jackson plays a nurse who Bill Murray falls for in a sketch involving the Nerds.; Final appearance of The Coneheads sketch.; "Bad Cabarat for Children" with Leonard Pinth-Garnell.; Mr. Bill Goes on a Diet.
80	14	Gary Busey	Eubie Blake & Gregory Hines; Gary Busey with Rick Danko & Paul Butterfield	March 10, 1979
Eubie Blake and Gregory Hines performs a medley of "Low-down Blues", "I'm Just Simply Full of Jazz" and "I'm Just Wild about Harry".; Gary Busey's band performs "Stay All Night".; Brian Doyle-Murray is one of John Belushi's sycophants during the cold open and also appears as an audience member with a question in "Women's Problems".; Paul Shaffer plays the bass in Busey's rock-n-roll band in the 1950s sketch.; Bill Murray stars in the Tom Schiller short, "Perchance to Dream".
81	15	Margot Kidder	The Chieftains	March 17, 1979
The Chieftains performs "If I Had Maggie in the Woods" and "Morning Dew"; Special Guests: Franken and Davis, Father Guido Sarducci; Lorne Michaels and the production staff appear with Margot Kidder and Gilda Radner in the opening monologue.; "Point/Counterpoint" regarding Lee Marvin's palimony case.; Mr Bill hides from Mr Hand.
82	16	Richard Benjamin	Rickie Lee Jones	April 7, 1979
Rickie Lee Jones performed "Chuck E.'s In Love" and "Coolsville".; In the cold open, John Belushi is sick and is replaced by an actor from NBC's replacement pool.; Rodney Dangerfield, Tom Davis, Brian Doyle-Murray and Al Franken make cameo appearances in The China Syndrome parody ("The Pepsi Syndrome").; One of the most popular sketches involving the Nerds where Todd and Lisa finally kiss.; Chico Escuela tries for a comeback with the Mets with cameos from several Mets players.
83	17	Milton Berle	Ornette Coleman	April 14, 1979
Ornette Coleman performed "Times Square".; Milton Berle's opening monologue featured bits from his nightclub stand-up routine, some of which were met with scant laughter. After about five minutes, Bill Murray dropped a large pipe offstage, making a loud noise and disrupting Berle's routine. When Berle was told by a producer at the foot of the stage that his monologue segment was complete, Berle responded incredulously. During the audience's applause while transitioning to a commercial, he can be seen angrily yelling, although it is unclear whether he is serious.; While on-air, Berle frequently mugged for the audience, did spit-takes, and ad-libbed straight to the camera.; At the end of the show, Berle broke into a "dreary version" of the 1950s standard "September Song" and, according to Lorne Michaels, loaded the audience with friends and family members who gave it a standing ovation. Michaels told director Dave Wilson immediately afterwards that this show was the worst ever; he kept it from appearing in syndicated reruns later.
84	18	Michael Palin	James Taylor	May 12, 1979
The opening monologue featured James Taylor performing "Johnnie Comes Back", his first of three songs in the show. Taylor later performs, "Up on the Roof" and "Millworker", all from his then recently released album, Flag.; Special Guest: Father Guido Sarducci; Dickens's "Miles Cowperthwaite", Part 2.; Final appearance of Dan Aykroyd's Jimmy Carter impersonation.; Mr Bill Runs Away From Home.
85	19	Maureen Stapleton	Linda Ronstadt & Phoebe Snow	May 19, 1979
Linda Ronstadt and Phoebe Snow performs duets of "The Shoop Shoop Song (It's in His Kiss)" and "The Married Men", which also included King Crimson guitarist Robert Fripp on Frippertronics, visible behind the duo along with his reel-to-reel tape decks to create the Frippertronics loop. Ronstadt also appears in the Nick the Lounge Singer sketch.; "Point/Counterpoint" regarding nuclear energy.; Mr Bill Goes to the Movies.
86	20	Buck Henry	Bette Midler	May 26, 1979
Mr Bill opens the show with "Live from New York ...", then Jane Curtin interrupts the opening credits, but John Belushi then opens the show, much to Jane's displeasure.; Bette Midler performed "Married Men" and "Martha", from her Thighs and Whispers album, with The Harlettes (Katey Sagal and Jocelyn Brown) and Luther Vandross as backup singers.; Special Guests: Mr. Mike, Franken and Davis; "Schiller's Reel" film called "Clones Exist Now".; The final appearance of Samurai Futaba and Olympia Cafe sketches.; Dan Aykroyd and John Belushi's final episode as cast members.

== Special ==
Title	Original release date
"Things We Did Last Summer"	October 28, 1978
On October 28, 1978, a special episode entitled "Things We Did Last Summer" aired, starring John Belushi and Dan Aykroyd performing 2 songs as The Blues Brothers, Garrett Morris, Bill Murray (playing baseball for the Grays Harbor Loggers), Lariane Newman and Gilda Radner.

== See also ==
- Recurring SNL characters and sketches introduced in season 4
- History of Saturday Night Live
