= Saturday Night Live with Howard Cosell =

American television variety show

- Advertisement for Saturday Night Live with Howard Cosell
- Genre: Variety show
- Presented by: Howard Cosell
- Starring: Bill Murray; Brian Doyle-Murray; Christopher Guest
- Country of origin: United States
- No. of seasons: 1
- No. of episodes: 18

Production
- Executive producer: Roone Arledge
- Producer: Rupert Hitzig
- Running time: 48 minutes
- Production company: ABC

Original release
- Network: ABC
- Release: September 20, 1975 – January 17, 1976

Saturday Night Live with Howard Cosell is an American television variety show that aired on ABC from September 20, 1975, to January 17, 1976, hosted by Howard Cosell and executive-produced by Roone Arledge. The series ran for 18 episodes before being cancelled. The show was later remembered by its director Don Mischer as "one of the greatest disasters in the history of television", largely because Cosell and Arledge were both veterans of sports broadcasting but had no experience with comedy and variety programming.

Despite having highly notable celebrities both as cast members and guests, Saturday Night Live with Howard Cosell has never been made available on home video.

Saturday Night Live with Howard Cosell is consistently confused with the sketch comedy program Saturday Night Live. In October 1975, rival network NBC began airing the late night comedy show NBC's Saturday Night, the creation of producer Lorne Michaels. The shows did not compete for the same time slot. Cosell's Saturday Night Live aired at 8 p.m. ET/PT, whereas NBC's Saturday Night aired at 11:30 p.m. After Cosell's show was cancelled, the NBC show adopted the Saturday Night Live name, with the show continued to be introduced on camera as "Live from New York, it's Saturday Night!".

== History ==
=== Cast and guests ===
The premiere episode featured celebrity guests Frank Sinatra, Shirley Bassey, Paul Anka, Siegfried and Roy, Yogi Berra, and the cast of the Broadway musical of The Wiz, who opened up the show as they danced out of the Majestic Theatre onto a yellow brick road as they sang their pop hit "Ease On down the Road" straight to the Ed Sullivan Theater as they met and escorted Howard Cosell on stage, tennis pro Jimmy Connors (who sang, while profusely sweating, Anka's "Girl, You Turn Me On" as a dedication to his girlfriend Chris Evert. Anka played the piano to accompany Connors), and John Denver. The episode's musical guest was the Bay City Rollers, from Scotland, whom Cosell dubbed "the next" British phenomenon.

The show featured Bill Murray, Brian Doyle-Murray, and Christopher Guest as regular comedy performers, dubbed "The Prime Time Players". In response, NBC's show Saturday Night called its regular performers "The Not-Ready-for-Prime-Time Players" (especially since the show didn't air in prime time, but late-night). Eventually, Murray, Doyle-Murray, and Guest would all work on the NBC program. Billy Crystal, who appeared on the premiere episode of Cosell's program, was also scheduled to appear on the premiere episode of the NBC show, but was bumped when the show ran long; he later joined the NBC program's cast, along with Guest, during Season 10 a decade later. Also, that season, Cosell himself guest-hosted the NBC program in its season finale on April 13, 1985.

=== Cancellation ===
Mischer described the show as chronically hectic and unprepared. He recalled one particular episode wherein executive producer Roone Arledge discovered that jazz musician Lionel Hampton was in New York City and invited him to appear on the show an hour before airtime.

The show fared poorly among critics and audiences alike, with TV Guide calling it "dead on arrival, with a cringingly awkward host". Alan King—the show's "executive in charge of comedy"—later admitted that it was difficult trying to turn Cosell into a variety show host, saying that he "made Ed Sullivan look like Buster Keaton".

ABC announced the cancellation of Saturday Night Live with Howard Cosell in November 1975, becoming the first casualty of the 1975–76 season. The eighteenth and final episode was aired on January 17, 1976. A year later, in 1977, NBC's Saturday Night added Live to its name.

== Reception ==
In 2002, TV Guide ranked the series number 37 on its "50 Worst TV Shows of All Time" list. In his book What Were They Thinking? The 100 Dumbest Events in Television History, author David Hofstede ranked the series at #30 on the list.
