= Emily Litella =

- Saturday Night Live character
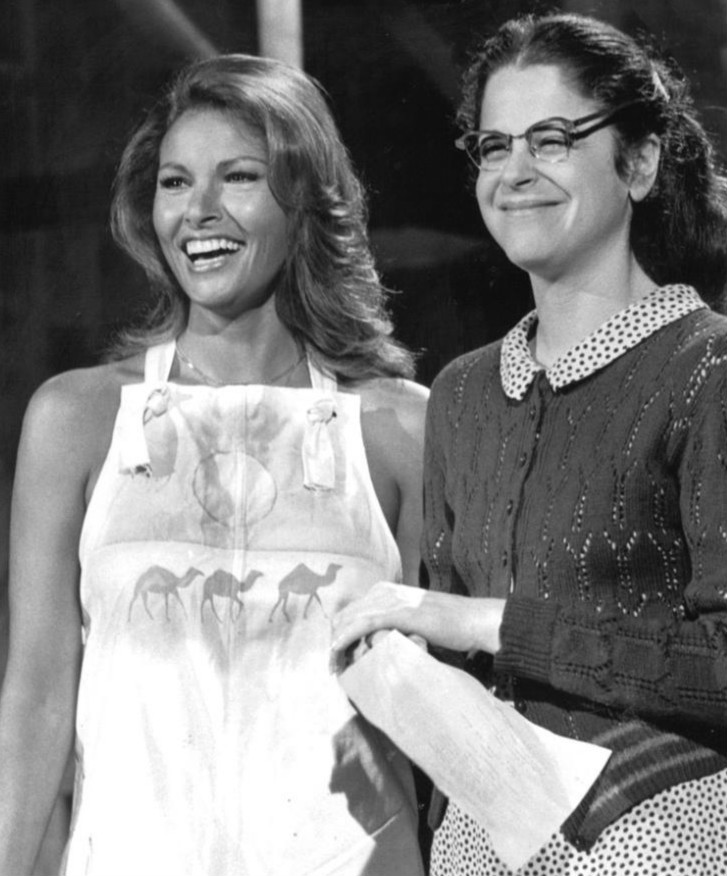
- Radner (right) dressed as Emily Litella with Raquel Welch during a 1976 SNL rehearsal
- First appearance: segment "Looks At Books"; SNL; November 15, 1975
- Created by: Gilda Radner
- Portrayed by: Gilda Radner

In-universe information
- Based on: Real-life person: Elizabeth "Dibby" Clementine Gillies

Emily Litella is a fictional character created and performed by comedian Gilda Radner in a series of appearances on Saturday Night Live. Based on a person in her early life, Emily Litella was a popular character in Radner's comedy repertoire.

== Premise ==
Emily Litella is an elderly woman with a hearing problem who appeared 26 times on SNL's Weekend Update op-ed segment between November 15, 1975 (Season 1) and December 17, 1977 (Season 3). Attired in a frumpy dress, sweater and Lisa Loopner eyeglasses, Litella was introduced with professional dignity by the news anchors, who could sometimes be seen cringing slightly in anticipation of the malapropisms they knew would follow. These sketches were, in part, a parody of the Fairness Doctrine, which at the time required broadcasters in the United States to present opposing viewpoints on public issues.

Litella would peer through her reading glasses and, in the character's high-pitched, warbly voice, would read a prepared statement in opposition to an editorial that the TV station had supposedly broadcast. Litella would become increasingly agitated as her statement progressed. Midway in her commentary, it became apparent to the anchor and the audience that Litella had misheard or misunderstood the subject of the editorial to which she was responding. A typical example:

What is all this fuss I hear about the Supreme Court decision on a "deaf" penalty? It's terrible! Deaf people have enough problems as it is!

The news anchor would interrupt Litella to point out her error, along the lines, "That's death penalty, Ms. Litella, not deaf ... death." Litella would wrinkle her nose, say something like, "Oh, that's very different," then meekly turn to the camera and say, smiling, "Never mind!"

When Litella played against news anchor Chevy Chase (whom she often called "Cheddar Cheese"), he would be somewhat sympathetic to her. After Chase left Saturday Night Live, Jane Curtin took over the anchor role and provided a more adversarial foil. Often, she would scold Litella, "Every week you come on and you get it wrong," to which Litella would reply, "Bitch!"

== Appearances ==
Overview of Emily Litella appearances
Air date	Litella malapropism	Actual phrase
December 13, 1975	Busting schoolchildren	Busing schoolchildren
December 20, 1975	Firing the handicapped	Hiring the handicapped
January 24, 1976	Saving Soviet jewelry	Saving Soviet Jewry
January 31, 1976	Eagle Rights Amendment	Equal Rights Amendment
February 14, 1976	Canker research	Cancer research
February 28, 1976	Deaf penalty	Death penalty
March 13, 1976	Conserving natural racehorses	Conserving natural resources
April 17, 1976	Presidential erections	Presidential elections
May 8, 1976	Violins on television	Violence on television
May 29, 1976	Flop story	Top story
September 18, 1976	Crustacean hijackers	Croatian hijackers
December 11, 1976	Unisex donations	UNICEF donations
January 15, 1977	Making Puerto Rico a steak	Making Puerto Rico a state
January 22, 1977	Burning tissues	Burning issues
January 22, 1977	Transcendental medication	Transcendental meditation
January 22, 1977	Maguda triangle	Bermuda Triangle
January 22, 1977	Air fags in cars	Airbags in cars
January 22, 1977	(unspecified vulgarity)	Duck
January 22, 1977	Flea elections in China / Flea erections	Free Elections in China
February 20, 1977	Liverboats	Riverboats
March 12, 1977	Endangered feces	Endangered species
April 9, 1977	"(You Make Me Feel Like) a National Woman"	"(You Make Me Feel Like) a Natural Woman"
April 23, 1977	Air solution	Air pollution
April 23, 1977	"I Will Swallow Him"	"I Will Follow Him"
May 14, 1977	Jeep	beep
May 21, 1977	Stella Abzug	Bella Abzug
May 21, 1977	Cat in the ring	Hat in the ring
December 17, 1977	Mr. Adenoid	Mr. Aykroyd
December 17, 1977	Jan / Miss Clayton	Jane Curtin
December 17, 1977	sst	SST
February 10, 1979	Porky and Bess	Porgy and Bess
February 10, 1979	Rodeo and Juliet	Romeo and Juliet

== History ==
Radner based Litella on her childhood nanny, Elizabeth Clementine Gillies, known as "Dibby", who was allegedly hard of hearing. The running gag "Never mind" became a lighthearted catchphrase of the era.

In her first appearance on SNL, the character of Emily Litella was an author who appeared as an interview subject on a show called "Looks At Books". Though she had the same wavery voice and somewhat frumpy wardrobe as she would in later episodes, Litella did not appear to have a hearing problem in this appearance. All but one of the subsequent SNL appearances by Litella were at the newsdesk, and featured the by-now much more familiar "editorial reply" iteration of the character. In the eleventh episode of season four, on February 10, 1979, with guest hostess Cicely Tyson, the final comedy sketch was called "Emily Litellavision", and featured Litella hosting a staging of a song from Porky and Bess, her Porky Pig–based mis-hearing of Porgy and Bess by George and Ira Gershwin and DuBose Heyward, with Garrett Morris singing a song to Tyson with added stuttering, and the orchestra shown wearing pig masks.

Outside of Saturday Night Live, Radner played the character briefly on The Muppet Show. At the top of that episode, Miss Litella is discovered backstage by stage manager Scooter, where she is vociferously complaining about the indignity of her appearing in something so silly as "The Muffin Show", whereupon Scooter gently persuades Miss Litella that she would be appearing on "The Muppet Show", not "The Muffin Show". After hearing this reassurance, she withdraws her objection, and meekly apologizes to Scooter by saying, "Never mind."

The character also appeared in Radner's 1979 one-woman off-Broadway show, Gilda Live, in which Litella took a job as a substitute teacher in Bedford-Stuyvesant, replacing a teacher who had been a victim of a stabbing by one of his students, which put him in the hospital. Miss Litella further cautioned her new students to be very careful where they put their toes, as the regular teacher's "stubbing" was the third such "stubbing", as Miss Litella put it, at the school that week alone; and that the "stubbings" must be pretty serious, in order to have put their teacher in hospital indefinitely.

A similar character, Anthony Crispino (played by Bobby Moynihan), made his first appearance on a Weekend Update in Season 35, and became a recurring character.

== See also ==
- Recurring Saturday Night Live characters and sketches
- Mondegreen
- Floyd R. Turbo
