= Small White House =

- Directed by: Richard Newton
- Written by: Joy Nicholson; Richard Newton
- Produced by: Richard Newton
- Starring: Enrico Boetcher; Brian Doyle-Murray; Richard Duardo; Heather Elias; Shahira Eversole; Kathy Foy; Charles C. Hill; Orb Kamm; Christina Kuta
- Cinematography: Sven Kirsten
- Edited by: Richard Newton
- Music by: Nicolas Dodet
- Release date: September 1990
- Country: United States
- Language: English

Small White House is a 1990 American drama film directed and produced by Richard Newton. The musical score was composed by Nicolas Dodet. The film stars Enrico Boetcher, Brian Doyle-Murray, Richard Duardo, Heather Elias, Shahira Eversole and Kathy Foy.

== Plot ==
The film is about a fictional love triangle between JFK, Jackie O., and Marilyn Monroe.

== Cast ==
- Enrico Boetcher
- Brian Doyle-Murray
- Richard Duardo
- Heather Elias
- Shahira Eversole
- Kathy Foy
- Charles C. Hill
- Orb Kamm
- Christina Kuta
