= Peter Aykroyd =

Canadian actor and comedian (1955–2021)

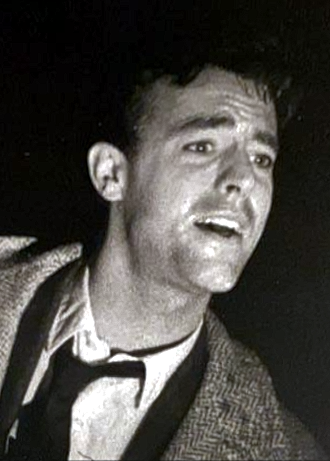
- Aykroyd in 1978
- Born: November 19, 1955; Ottawa, Ontario, Canada
- Died: November 6, 2021 (aged 65); Spokane, Washington, U.S.
- Occupations: Actor; comedian; writer; producer
- Years active: 1977–1999
- Relatives: Dan Aykroyd (brother); Donna Dixon (sister-in-law); Danielle Aykroyd (niece)

Peter Aykroyd (/ˈækrɔɪd/ AK-royd; November 19, 1955 – November 6, 2021) was a Canadian actor, comedian, and writer, known for his work with the Toronto comedy troupe Second City, and the American sketch comedy TV series Saturday Night Live, both of which also featured his older brother, Dan Aykroyd, with whom he collaborated on works such as the screenplay for the 1991 feature film comedy Nothing but Trouble.

== Early life ==
Peter Aykroyd was born November 19, 1955 in Ottawa to Lorraine (1918–2018) and Peter Hugh Aykroyd (1922–2020). He was the younger brother of comedian Dan Aykroyd.

== Career ==
Aykroyd and his brother Dan were in the Second City comedy troupe in Toronto. The two were also on Saturday Night Live. He was a cast member and writer during the show's fifth season, from 1979 to 1980.

Aykroyd and his brother Dan wrote the 1991 film Nothing but Trouble. Aykroyd wrote the story and Dan wrote the screenplay. In 1996, Aykroyd co-created the Canadian sci-fi show Psi Factor with Christopher Chacon and Peter Ventrella; the show was hosted by his brother Dan and produced 88 episodes.

In 1997, Aykroyd and Jim Belushi provided the voices of Elwood Blues and Jake Blues for the cartoon The Blues Brothers: Animated Series, playing the roles made famous by their respective brothers Dan and John. Peter Aykroyd appeared in such films as Spies Like Us, Dragnet, Nothing but Trouble and Coneheads.

== Death ==
Aykroyd died in Spokane, Washington, on November 6, 2021, at age 65, from sepsis caused by an untreated abdominal hernia. His death was first announced two weeks later, via a title card on Saturday Night Live.

== Filmography ==
=== Film ===
Year	Title	Role	Notes
1979	Java Junkie	Joe	
1981	Gas	Ed Marshal	
1983	Doctor Detroit	Mr. Frankman	
1983	The Funny Farm	Stephen Croft	
1984	Nothing Lasts Forever	Musician	
1985	Spies Like Us	Unger	
1987	Dragnet	Phoney Cop #2	
1991	Nothing but Trouble	Mike, The Doorman	Also writer Nominated 1992 Razzie Award for Worst Screenplay (with Dan Aykroyd)
1993	Coneheads	Highmaster's Aide	
1995	Kids of the Round Table	Mr. Cole, Alex's Father	

=== Television ===
Year	Title	Role	First Episode	Notes
1977	The New Avengers	Mirschtia	"Emily"	1 episode
1978	Second City TV	Saloon Patron	"Alfred Hitchcock Presents"	1 episode
1979–1980	Saturday Night Live	Various Roles	"Teri Garr/The B-52's"	16 episodes, also writer Nominated 1980 Emmy for Outstanding Writing in a Variety or Music Program
1985	From Here to Maternity	Jack	—N/a	TV movie
1986	Leo & Liz in Beverly Hills	"Bunky"	"Unaccustomed as I Am To Public Speaking"	2 episodes
1996–2000	Psi Factor: Chronicles of the Paranormal	CIA Agent	"John Doe"	Writer, creator, executive producer
1999	Justice	George Norton	—N/a	TV movie
