= Saturday Night Live parodies of Joe Biden =

The sketch comedy television series Saturday Night Live (SNL) has parodied President Joe Biden since 1991, covering his time as a United States Senator, his time as Vice President under President Barack Obama, during his campaign to defeat president Donald Trump for the presidency, and as the president of the United States.

To date, Biden has been portrayed by nine performers: Kevin Nealon, Jason Sudeikis, Woody Harrelson, John Mulaney, Jim Carrey, Alex Moffat, James Austin Johnson, Mikey Day, and Dana Carvey.

== Kevin Nealon (1991) ==
Weekend Update anchor Kevin Nealon was the first to portray Joe Biden on Saturday Night Live. He did so during the show's seventeenth season on October 12, 1991, during the episode's cold open. The sketch centered around Clarence Thomas, who was in the process of becoming a member of the Supreme Court while tackling sexual harassment allegations from Anita Hill. It featured Tim Meadows as Thomas, Ellen Cleghorne as Hill, Dana Carvey as Strom Thurmond, Chris Farley as Howell Heflin, Phil Hartman as Edward Kennedy, and Nealon as Biden. The segment followed the Senate Judiciary Committee as they mocked Thomas for failing to date Hill, and as they traded dating advice with each other.

== Jason Sudeikis (2007–2021) ==
Jason Sudeikis was the second performer to portray Biden on SNL, doing so from November 3, 2007, to October 23, 2021. In his portrayal, Sudeikis said "the outgoingness and gregariousness" of his performance was inspired by his father, whom Sudeikis felt bore similarities to Biden in that they were both "people person[s]".

== Woody Harrelson (2019) ==
Woody Harrelson was the third performer to portray Biden on SNL, doing so for three episodes, on September 28, October 12, and November 23, 2019.

== John Mulaney (2020) ==
John Mulaney was the fourth performer to portray Biden on SNL. He replaced both Sudeikis and Harrelson for the role on February 29, 2020, which he hosted as part of the forty-fifth season of the show.

== Jim Carrey (2020) ==
Carrey's portrayal of Biden saw criticism for its energeticism, but also praise for portraying Biden's perceived "creepiness".

Jim Carrey portrayed Biden for the beginning of the forty-sixth season of SNL. Carrey first appeared as Biden on October 3, 2020. Throughout the season, Carrey's Biden appeared frequently alongside his real-life running mate Kamala Harris, portrayed by Maya Rudolph. On December 19, 2020, Carrey announced that he would step down from playing Biden, saying he only ever intended to play him for six weeks.

Carrey's portrayal of Biden garnered mixed reactions from both viewers and critics. Criticisms of Carrey's performance characterized it as being too energetic, which contrasted with the actual Biden, who was perceived as "slow and boring". Cartoonist Rob Rogers remarked Carrey got aspects of his portrayal right, such as Biden's vocal inflections and "creepiness," but failed to capture "the whole thing." Writing for Vanity Fair, Karen Valby summarized her issue with Carrey's performance, "[Carrey] gives a bad Joe Biden when the country has never needed a good Joe Biden more."

== Alex Moffat (2020–2021) ==
Alex Moffat replaced Carrey to portray Biden on December 19, 2020.

== James Austin Johnson (2021–2022) ==
James Austin Johnson debuted his Biden impersonation during SNL's Season 47 premiere.

== Mikey Day (2023–24) ==
Beginning with the third episode of season 49, veteran cast member Mikey Day took over impersonating Biden.

== Dana Carvey (2024–present) ==
With the premiere of 50th season, former cast member Dana Carvey took over the role of Joe Biden (Carvey had done the impressions several times outside of SNL).
