= Saturday Night Live season 5 =

Saturday Night Live
- Season 5
- Starring: Jane Curtin; Garrett Morris; Bill Murray; Laraine Newman; Gilda Radner
- No. of episodes: 20

Release
- Original network: NBC
- Original release: October 13, 1979 – May 24, 1980

Season chronology
- ← Previous season 4 Next → season 6

The fifth season of Saturday Night Live, an American sketch comedy series, originally aired in the United States on NBC between October 13, 1979, and May 24, 1980.

== Cast ==
Dan Aykroyd and John Belushi left the show at the end of season 4, leaving a void in the cast that most fans thought would be the beginning of the end of the late-night sketch comedy show. Belushi left to make movies while Aykroyd had intended to stay for the fifth season, only to change his mind to concentrate on filming The Blues Brothers only weeks leading up to the season premiere. Aykroyd's sudden departure caused a rift between him and Lorne Michaels that wouldn't be healed for many years.

This is the first season of the show where the opening credits include "featured players", starting with the fifth episode. The concept evolves onscreen, with Harry Shearer being credited as "a little of Harry Shearer" in the second episode before the "featuring" category is introduced in the fifth episode. To keep the show going, Michaels upgraded many of the show's writers to featured cast member status: Peter Aykroyd (Dan's brother), Jim Downey, Brian Doyle-Murray (Bill's brother), Don Novello (also credited as Father Guido Sarducci), and Paul Shaffer. Longtime writers Tom Schiller and Alan Zweibel are credited as featured players for only the April 19th, 1980 episode. Shearer was promoted to repertory status midway through the season.

Although Al Franken, Tom Davis and Novello were credited as special guests for individual episodes in which they performed their own segments in earlier seasons of the show (with Franken and Davis being semi-official cast members for the previous two seasons), they officially became featured players starting midway through this season when the featured player category was introduced. Novello is credited as a guest star under his character Father Guido Sarducci's name in two episodes before he becomes a featured player.

This season was the first to have two members of the same family as cast members (Bill Murray and Brian Doyle-Murray).

This would be the final season for everyone in the cast. Davis and Downey would return to the show in future seasons as writers. Franken, Doyle-Murray, Novello and Shearer would rejoin the cast in future seasons (Franken would also return as a writer).

**Repertory players**

- **Jane Curtin**
- Garrett Morris
- **Bill Murray**
- Laraine Newman
- Gilda Radner
- Harry Shearer (first episode: October 20, 1979; upgraded to repertory status: February 9, 1980)

**Featured players**

- Peter Aykroyd (first episode: January 26, 1980)
- Tom Davis (first credited episode: November 17, 1979)
- Jim Downey (first episode: January 26, 1980)
- Brian Doyle-Murray (first episode: January 26, 1980)
- Al Franken (first credited episode: December 15, 1979)
- Don Novello (first episode: December 8, 1979; final episode: May 17, 1980)
- Tom Schiller (only episode: April 19, 1980)
- Paul Shaffer (first episode: November 17, 1979)
- Alan Zweibel (only episode: April 19, 1980)

bold denotes Weekend Update anchor

Featured cast members announced and shown during the "Opening Introductions" varied from week to week, as noted below in each episode's description. Shearer is credited for seven episodes as a featured player before becoming part of the main cast. Davis is credited as a featured player for 12 episodes. Doyle-Murray, Franken and Shaffer are credited for 10 episodes each. Novello is credited as a featured player for eight episodes (not counting the two episodes he guest starred in prior to becoming a featured player). Aykroyd is credited for six episodes, Downey is credited for three and Schiller and Zweibel are each credited for one episode only.

== Writers ==
As previously mentioned, Michaels upgraded many of the show's writers to cast member status, including Aykroyd, Davis, Downey, Doyle-Murray, Franken, Novello, Schiller and Zweibel.

New Writers this season included Tom Gammill, Matt Neuman, Sarah Paley, and Max Pross

This season's writers were Peter Aykroyd, Anne Beatts, Tom Davis, Jim Downey, Brian Doyle-Murray, Al Franken, Tom Gammill, Lorne Michaels, Matt Neuman, Don Novello, Sarah Paley, Max Pross, Herb Sargent, Tom Schiller, Harry Shearer, Rosie Shuster, and Alan Zweibel. Doyle-Murray would be the only one to return as a writer in the following season. (Although Downey, Franken, Davis, Michaels, Novello, Sargent, Schiller, Shearer, and Shuster would return in later seasons)

== Episodes ==
No. overall	No. in season	Host(s)	Musical guest(s)	Original release date
87	1	Steve Martin	Blondie	October 13, 1979
Blondie performs "Dreaming" and "The Hardest Part".; Special Guest: Father Guido Sarducci; The All-New Mr. Bill Show.; Buck Henry has a cameo.
88	2	Eric Idle	Bob Dylan	October 20, 1979
Eric Idle's fourth and final time hosting.; Dylan performs "Gotta Serve Somebody", "I Believe in You" and "When You Gonna Wake Up".; Special Guest: Andy Kaufman; Buck Henry has an uncredited cameo in the cold open.; Kaufman challenges the women in the studio audience to a wrestling match.; Harry Shearer's first episode as cast member. He is not announced as a featured player. Rather, Don Pardo announces "and a little of Harry Shearer."
89	3	Bill Russell	Chicago	November 3, 1979
Chicago performs "I'm a Man" and "Street Player".; Mr. Bill Stays Home.; Harry Shearer appears in the show but does not receive credit in the opening.
90	4	Buck Henry	Tom Petty and the Heartbreakers	November 10, 1979
Tom Petty & The Heartbreakers performs "Refugee" and "Don't Do Me Like That".; Special Guest: Father Guido Sarducci; Harry Shearer appears in the show but does not receive credit in the opening.
91	5	Bea Arthur	The Roches	November 17, 1979
The Roches performs "Bobby's Song" (from their second album, "Nurds") and "The Hallelujah Chorus" (from their third album, "Keep On Doing").; Andy Kaufman guest stars.; Mr. Bill Builds A House.; This is the first episode where the opening credits have a "featured" category and the first instance of featured players.; Tom Davis and Paul Shaffer's first episodes as featured players.; Credited Featured Players: Tom Davis, Paul Shaffer and Harry Shearer.
92	6	Howard Hesseman	Randy Newman	December 8, 1979
Randy Newman performs "It's Money That I Love", "The Story of a Rock and Roll Band", and "Pants".; Don Novello's first episode as a featured player.; Credited Featured Players: Don Novello, Paul Shaffer and Harry Shearer.
93	7	Martin Sheen	David Bowie	December 15, 1979
Bowie performs "The Man Who Sold the World", "TVC 15" and "Boys Keep Swinging".; Klaus Nomi and Joey Arias make guest appearances as backup singers.; Credited Featured Players: Tom Davis, Al Franken, Don Novello (credited under the name of his character Father Guido Sarducci), and Harry Shearer.; Although he had guest starred on multiple episodes as half of the comedy team Franken and Davis, this was Al Franken's first episode as a featured player.; On the January 16, 2016 episode (hosted by Adam Driver) SNL paid tribute to David Bowie, who had died six days earlier, by playing a clip of his performance of "The Man Who Sold the World" (introduced by Fred Armisen) and posting the full performance on its website (and briefly on YouTube).
94	8	Ted Knight	Desmond Child & Rouge	December 22, 1979
Desmond Child & Rouge performs "Goodbye Baby" and "Tumble In The Night".; Special Guest: Andy Kaufman; G.E. Smith plays guitar for Desmond Child.; Credited Featured Players: Tom Davis, Al Franken, Paul Shaffer, and Harry Shearer.
95	9	Teri Garr	The B-52's	January 26, 1980
The B-52's performs "Rock Lobster" and "Dance This Mess Around."; Mr. Bill Gets Help.; Presidential candidate John B. Anderson appears in a sketch.; Peter Aykroyd, Jim Downey, and Brian Doyle-Murray's first episode as cast members.; Credited Featured Players: Peter Aykroyd, Tom Davis, Jim Downey, Brian Doyle-Murray, Al Franken, Don Novello and Harry Shearer.
96	10	Chevy Chase	Marianne Faithfull; Tom Scott	February 9, 1980
Marianne Faithfull performs "Broken English" and "Guilt".; Chevy Chase and Tom Scott perform "Sixteen Tons".; Credited Featured Players: Peter Aykroyd, Tom Davis, Brian Doyle-Murray, Al Franken, Don Novello and Paul Shaffer.; Bert Convy appears in the "You Can't Win" sketch.; Harry Shearer's first episode as a member of the main repertory cast rather than as a featured performer.; New opening montage, featuring all cast members in rolling still images in a bar setting.
97	11	Elliott Gould	Gary Numan	February 16, 1980
Gary Numan performs "Cars" and "Praying to the Aliens".; A running gag where Father Guido Sarducci attempts to interview former President Richard Nixon, and stakes out his New York apartment building.; JAP character Rhonda Weiss (Gilda Radner) performs a takeoff on Jordache: "She's the Jewess in Jewess jeans"; Contains "The Incredible Man" sketch.; Credited Featured Players: Peter Aykroyd, Tom Davis, Brian Doyle-Murray, Al Franken and Don Novello.
98	12	Kirk Douglas	Sam & Dave	February 23, 1980
Sam & Dave perform "You Don't Know Like I Know" and "Soul Man".; Credited Featured Players: Tom Davis, Jim Downey, Brian Doyle-Murray and Al Franken; This episode re-aired on February 8, 2020 as a tribute to Kirk Douglas who had died 3 days prior.; It was announced during the previous episode’s goodnights that the original musical guest for this episode was James Brown, but he cancelled for reasons unknown.
99	13	Rodney Dangerfield	The J. Geils Band	March 8, 1980
The J. Geils Band performs "Love Stinks" and "Sanctuary".; Leave It to Beaver cast members Tony Dow and Jerry Mathers appear during Weekend Update.; Actor Rob Morrow appears as an extra in a sketch. He would later host the show during Season 17.; Credited Featured Players: Peter Aykroyd, Brian Doyle-Murray, Don Novello and Paul Shaffer.
100	14	(none)	Paul Simon; James Taylor; David Sanborn	March 15, 1980
No announced guest host. There was no monologue. Instead, Bill Murray performs a song about New York.; Paul Simon and James Taylor perform "Cathy's Clown", "Sunny Skies" and "Take Me to the Mardi Gras".; Sen. Daniel Patrick Moynihan from New York and Ralph Nader appear on the show as themselves. Moynihan introduces a sketch about leprechauns and appears in a sketch about sophisticated winos that ends up being an ad for wines from New York State. Nader appears in a segment on "Weekend Update".; Michael Palin appears in a sketch called "Talk or Die" that includes Jane Curtin playing Rula Lenska.; David Sanborn performs "Anything You Want".; During a sketch about a medieval band rehearsing for a performance (which features John Belushi towards the end), Paul Shaffer said the word "fuck" live on the air.; Credited Featured Players: Peter Aykroyd, Tom Davis, Brian Doyle-Murray and Paul Shaffer.; The show's 100th episode, featuring several cameos (including John Belushi and Michael O'Donoghue).
101	15	Richard Benjamin; Paula Prentiss	Grateful Dead	April 5, 1980
Grateful Dead performs "Alabama Getaway" and "Saint of Circumstance,". both from the album Go To Heaven; Mr. Bill Strikes Back; Credited Featured Players: Tom Davis and Al Franken.
102	16	Burt Reynolds	Anne Murray	April 12, 1980
Anne Murray performs "Lucky Me" and "Why Don't You Stick Around".; Credited Featured Players: Tom Davis, Brian Doyle-Murray, Al Franken, Don Novello and Paul Shaffer.
103	17	Strother Martin	The Specials	April 19, 1980
Strother Martin's final television appearance before his death in August 1980; The Specials perform "Gangsters" and "Too Much, Too Young".; Tom Schiller and Alan Zweibel's only episode as cast members.; Credited Featured Players: Tom Davis, Brian Doyle-Murray, Tom Schiller, Paul Shaffer and Alan Zweibel.
104	18	Bob Newhart	The Amazing Rhythm Aces; Bruce Cockburn	May 10, 1980
The Amazing Rhythm Aces perform "Who Will the Next Fool Be" and "Third Rate Romance". (Joined by Murray on the Maracas); Bruce Cockburn performs "Wondering Where the Lions Are".; In a Weekend Update commentary, "A Limo for a Lame-O", Al Franken laments that he does not have limo service like NBC president Fred Silverman, despite the network's poor ratings and shaky finances under Silverman's leadership. This ruined Franken's slim chance of succeeding Lorne Michaels as the show's executive producer; Mr. Bill Gets 20 Years In Sing Sing.; Credited Featured Players: Brian Doyle-Murray, Al Franken and Paul Shaffer.
105	19	Steve Martin	3-D; Paul McCartney and Linda McCartney	May 17, 1980
3-D performs "All-Night Television".; Paul McCartney premieres the music video for his single "Coming Up".; Credited Featured Player: Don Novello; Novello's final episode as a cast member (until season 11).; Steve Martin's final episode as host (until season 12).
106	20	Buck Henry	Andrew Gold; Andrae Crouch & the Voices of Unity	May 24, 1980
Buck Henry's tenth and final time as host.; Andrew Gold performs "Kiss This One Goodbye".; Andrae Crouch & the Voices of Unity perform "Can't Nobody Do Me Like Jesus".; Contains the "Lord and Lady Douchebag" sketch, in which the word "douchebag" was said 12 times.; Future cast member Yvonne Hudson appears in the Nick the Lounge Singer sketch.; Credited Featured Players: Peter Aykroyd, Tom Davis, Jim Downey, Brian Doyle-Murray, Al Franken and Paul Shaffer.; Jane Curtin, Garrett Morris, Bill Murray, Laraine Newman and Gilda Radner's final episode as cast members.; Peter Aykroyd, Tom Davis, Jim Downey and Paul Shaffer's final episode as featured performers.; Brian Doyle-Murray's final episode (until season 7).; Harry Shearer's final episode (until season 10).; Al Franken's final episode (until season 11).; Lorne Michaels' final episode as executive producer (until season 11).

== Home media ==
SNL's fifth season was released on DVD on December 1, 2009.
