= Dan Vitale (comedian) =

American comedian (died 2022)

- Died: May 6, 2022; Manhattan, New York, U.S.
- Occupations: Comedian, actor
- Years active: 1970s–2022
- Notable work: Saturday Night Live

Dan Vitale was an American comedian, best known for being a cast member on Saturday Night Live from 1985 to 1986, appearing in two episodes of its eleventh season.

== Early life ==
Vitale was born in Long Island. His mother was an alcoholic and his father, according to Vitale, was a "possibly mobbed up" father who "unknown but shady business dealings". His sister died in a car crash when he was thirteen years old. He was brought up in Flushing, Queens. Vitale abused drugs and alcohol as a teenager, and used comedy as a coping mechanism.

== Career ==
He moved to Greenwich Village in the late 1970s to start his career in comedy, performing at open mic nights and working with writer Tom Saunders.

Vitale caught the attention of Lorne Michaels in 1983, who was looking for cast members for The New Show. Vitale bombed the audition, reportedly lashing out at the audience: "I get in the room, and I see Lorne, John Candy, Dave Thomas, Penny Marshall, all these people I'd seen for years. I get up and I didn't have anything tight prepared because I'd work loose, organic. I start talking, then I get into it, a character. I get no reaction. Absolutely zero. And the arrogance of me in my 20s, at one point, in the middle, I said, "You know, I have a better idea. Why don't all you guys just go fuck yourselves." And I walked out."

Despite his outburst, Michaels allowed him to audition for another show, as according to Vitale he "kind of dug it", and auditioned the pilot episode for another one of his shows, Big Shots in America, which he passed and starred in alongside Joe Mantegna. Big Shots in America was never given a series however Lorne let Vitale audition for Saturday Night Live in 1985, and was brought on the show for its eleventh season.

Vitale was first brought on for an episode taped live on November 23, 1985, and then his second and last appearance on February 8, 1986. He was fired in early 1986 due to his drug and alcohol abuse.

Following his firing from SNL, Vitale found work as an uncredited extra in films and shows including Anger Management and Malibu's Most Wanted and in 2006 starred in a one-man show, Live from Rehab, It's Dan Vitale.

== Personal life ==
Vitale lived in Manhattan since 1980. He died on May 6, 2022.

== Filmography ==
=== Film ===
Year	Title	Role	Notes
1993	Who's the Man?	Bartender	Uncredited
2003	Anger Management	Monk	Uncredited
2003	Malibu's Most Wanted	Man	Uncredited
2012	Gangs of Brooklyn	Man on phone	

=== Television ===
Year	Title	Role	Notes
1984	The New Show	Various	One episode
1985	Big Shots in America	Dave	Pilot episode
1985—1986	Saturday Night Live	Various	Two episodes
