= Miskel Spillman =

Television personality

Miskel Spillman (September 8, 1897 – March 30, 1992) was the winner of the only "Anyone Can Host" contest on NBC's late-night variety series Saturday Night Live, and hosted the December 17, 1977, broadcast of the show. An 80-year-old German immigrant and grandmother from New Orleans, Spillman held the record as the oldest host in SNL's history (two weeks older than Ruth Gordon when she hosted on January 22, 1977) for thirty-two years, until it was broken on May 8, 2010, by 88-year-old Betty White. Spillman remains the only non-celebrity to host the program.

== Contest entry in Saturday Night Live ==
Entrants to Saturday Night Live's "Anyone Can Host" contest were asked to write, in 25 words or less, why they should be selected to host the program. Spillman's winning entry read: "I'm 80 years old. I need one more cheap thrill, since my doctor told me I only have another 25 years left." Her appearance as host (the Season 3 Christmas episode, also featuring Buck Henry) began with a joke involving herself and cast member John Belushi sharing a joint, followed by a marijuana-induced obsession with a bowl of fruit (going so far as to swat away Henry's hands whenever he tried to grab the bowl).

After hosting, Spillman remained a fan of the program and stayed up to watch it in her later years, proclaiming herself to particularly enjoy Dana Carvey and especially his character, The Church Lady.
