= Brian Doyle-Murray =

American actor (born 1945)

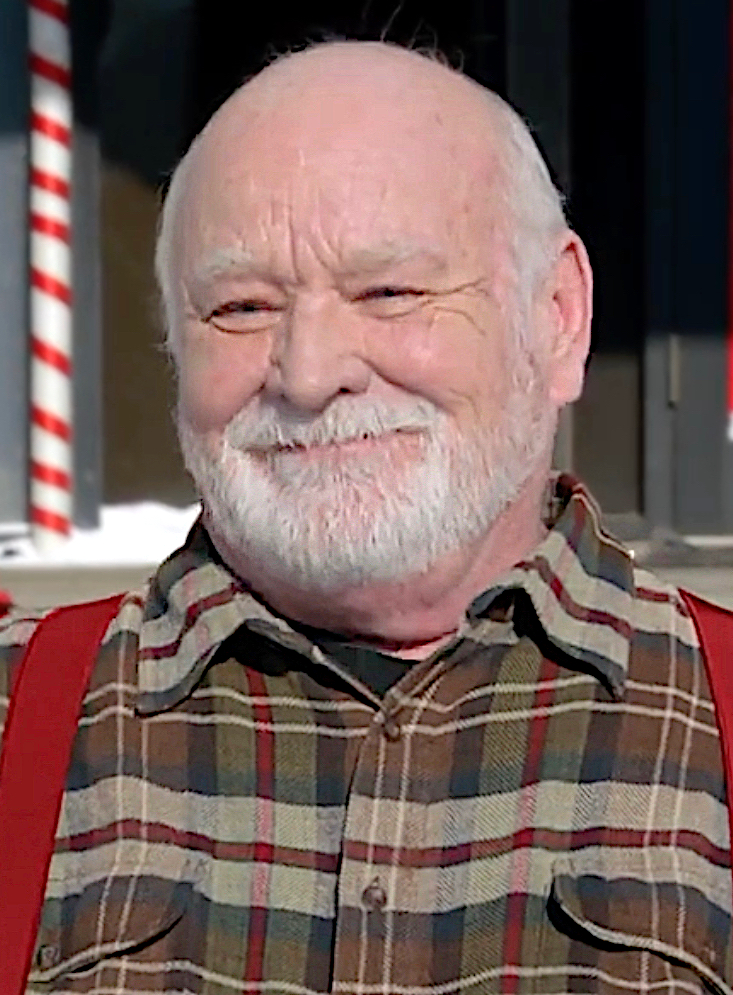
- Doyle-Murray in Christmas Under Wraps (2014)
- Born: Brian Murray; October 31, 1945 (age 81); Evanston, Illinois, U.S.
- Other name: Brian Doyle
- Occupations: Actor; comedian; screenwriter
- Years active: 1972–present
- Spouse: Christina Stauffer (m. 2000)
- Relatives: Bill Murray (brother); Joel Murray (brother)

Brian Murray (born October 31, 1945), known professionally as Brian Doyle-Murray, is an American actor, comedian and screenwriter. He appeared with his younger brother, actor and comedian Bill Murray, in several films, including Caddyshack (1980), The Razor's Edge (1984), Scrooged (1988), Ghostbusters II (1989), and Groundhog Day (1993). He co-starred on the TBS sitcom Sullivan & Son, where he played the foul-mouthed Hank Murphy. He also appeared in the Nickelodeon animated series SpongeBob SquarePants as The Flying Dutchman, the Cartoon Network original animated series My Gym Partner's a Monkey as Coach Tiffany Gills, The Marvelous Misadventures of Flapjack as Captain K'nuckles, a recurring role as Don Ehlert on the ABC sitcom The Middle, and Bob Kruger in the AMC dramedy Lodge 49.

Doyle-Murray was nominated for three Emmy Awards in 1978, 1979, and 1980 for his work on Saturday Night Live in the category Primetime Emmy Award for Outstanding Writing for a Variety, Music or Comedy Program. Two other younger brothers, Joel and John, are actors, as well. His oldest brother Ed was a businessman prior to his death in 2020 and brother Andy is a chef and runs the Murray Brothers "CaddyShack" restaurant located in the World Golf Village resort near St. Augustine, Florida. Doyle is his grandmother's maiden name, and he chose to hyphenate it to avoid confusion with another actor.

== Early life ==
Brian Murray was born on October 31, 1945, at St. Francis Hospital in Evanston, Illinois. He is one of nine children born to Irish Catholic parents Lucille (née Collins; 1921–1988), a mailroom clerk, and Edward Joseph Murray II (1921–1967), a lumber salesman. He attended Saint Mary's College of California in Moraga, California, in the late 1960s.

== Career ==
Murray worked at The Second City comedic stage troupe in the early 1970s. He was also a regular on The National Lampoon Radio Hour, a comedy program syndicated nationally to 600 stations from 1973 to 1975. Co-workers on the Radio Hour included Richard Belzer, John Belushi, Gilda Radner, Harold Ramis, and younger brother Bill. He was also a featured performer in The National Lampoon Show stage show (with Belushi, Radner, Ramis, and his brother Bill) in 1974–1975.

He then appeared as a cast member on the ABC variety show Saturday Night Live with Howard Cosell, alongside his brother Bill and fellow Lampoon alum Christopher Guest. By January 1976, the series was canceled, and Bill became a cast member on NBC's Saturday Night Live during its second season in 1977. By the second half of the show's third season in 1978, Doyle-Murray was hired as a writer. Amid some cast changes, Doyle-Murray was made a featured cast member, within the second half of the show's fifth season in 1980. He remained the only writer to return to the show in season 6, and though not a featured player any more, he wrote for Jean Doumanian for 1980 to 1981, after executive producer Lorne Michaels, the entire cast, and most of the writing staff had left. After Dick Ebersol took over as producer near the end of the season, Doyle-Murray was retained as a writer (despite not writing for the April 11 finale), and returned as a featured player for the show's seventh season from 1981 to 1982, in which he also anchored Weekend Update (which was renamed SNL Newsbreak during his sole season anchoring the segment). Additionally, he and fellow writers Barry Blaustein, David Sheffield, and Pam Norris were the only writers from Doumanian's tenure to return for season 7. He departed after the end of season 7 after 4½ years writing for the show, and two non-consecutive seasons, as a featured player.

He is one of the few people to have worked as a writer for all three producers of the show (Lorne Michaels, Jean Doumanian, and Dick Ebersol). For his work on the show, he was nominated for three Emmy Awards in 1978, 1979, and 1980 in the category Primetime Emmy Award for Outstanding Writing for a Variety, Music or Comedy Program.

Murray has appeared in many films with his brother, Bill Murray, including Caddyshack (1980, his film debut), The Razor's Edge (1984), Scrooged (1988), Ghostbusters II (1989), and Groundhog Day (1993). He has also landed roles in other films. Early on, he appeared in Modern Problems (1981) alongside Chevy Chase. He also appeared with Chase in a small role as a camp clerk in National Lampoon's Vacation (1983), and later memorably appeared as Clark's uptight boss, Frank Shirley, in National Lampoon's Christmas Vacation (1989). He landed a small role as Jack Ruby in JFK (1991). He co-starred as arcade tycoon Noah Vanderhoff in the film version of Wayne's World (1992). He was also seen in the movies Sixteen Candles (1984), Club Paradise (1986), Legal Eagles (1986), How I Got Into College (1989), Jury Duty (1995), Multiplicity (1996), The Jungle Book: Mowgli's Story (1997), As Good as It Gets (1997), Dr. Dolittle (1998), Stuart Little (1999), Kill the Man (1999), Bedazzled (2000), Snow Dogs (2002), Nearing Grace (2005), Daddy Day Camp (2007), and 17 Again (2009).

He portrayed Mel Sanger, the bubble boy's dad, on Seinfeld, and played Joe Hackett's high-school baseball coach on a 1992 episode of Wings. He co-starred on the Fox TV series Get a Life and Bakersfield P.D. from 1991 to 1992 and 1993 to 1994, respectively, with a recurring role as sports editor Stuart Franklin on the Fox/UPN TV series Between Brothers from 1997 to 1999. He played studio head and Greg Warner's (Anthony Clark) boss George Savitsky on Yes Dear. He played Shawn Spencer's grandfather on the episode "The Old and the Restless" on the USA Network TV series Psych, with an uncredited cameo in the sixth season. He had a recurring role as Mr. Ehlert, owner of the car dealership where Frankie Heck works on the ABC-TV series The Middle. He co-starred on the TBS sitcom on Sullivan & Son, where he played the foul-mouthed Hank Murphy. He recently appeared on Lodge 49 on the AMC Network (now canceled).

Murray voices the Flying Dutchman on Nickelodeon's SpongeBob SquarePants, Coach Tiffany Gills on the Cartoon Network original animated series My Gym Partner's a Monkey, and had a leading role as Captain K'nuckles in The Marvelous Misadventures of Flapjack. He appeared in one episode of The Angry Beavers. Murray appears as Santa Claus in the CatDog episode "A Very CatDog Christmas". He has also appeared as Salty in the Family Guy episode "A Fish Out of Water", the voice of Jack the barber on King of the Hill, the voice of the mayor in the Ghostbusters video game, the voice of Qui the Promoter in the 2005 video game Jade Empire, Prince Huge on Adventure Time in the episode "The Hard Easy", Charlie in Mike Judge's The Goode Family, and Jacob on Motorcity. Murray voiced the villainous corporate executive Mr. Twitchell on the Christmas special Frosty Returns.

== Personal life ==
Murray has been married to Christina Stauffer since August 28, 2000.

== Filmography ==
=== Film ===
Year	Title	Role	Notes
1972	Fuzz	Detective	
1975	Tarzoon: Shame of the Jungle	Charles of the Pits #1	English version, voice
1980	Caddyshack	Lou Loomis	also a writer
1981	Modern Problems	Brian Stills	
1983	National Lampoon's Vacation	Kamp Komfort Clerk	
1984	Sixteen Candles	Reverend	
1984	The Razor's Edge	Piedmont	
1985	Head Office	Colonel Tolliver	
1986	Legal Eagles	Shaw	
1986	Club Paradise	Voit Zerbe	also a writer
1988	Scrooged	Earl Cross	
1988	Superman 50th Anniversary	Brian Connelly	
1989	The Experts	Mr. Jones	
1989	How I Got into College	Coach Evans	
1989	Ghostbusters II	Psychiatric Doctor	
1989	National Lampoon's Christmas Vacation	Frank Shirley	
1990	Small White House	Johnny's Father	
1991	Nothing but Trouble	FBI Agent Brian	
1991	Babe Ruth	Marshall Hunt	
1991	JFK	Jack Ruby	
1992	Wayne's World	Noah Vanderhoff	
1993	Groundhog Day	Buster Green	
1994	Cabin Boy	Skunk	
1995	My Brother's Keeper	Curtis	
1995	Jury Duty	Harry	
1996	Multiplicity	Walt	
1996	Waiting for Guffman	Red Savage	
1997	Casper: A Spirited Beginning	Foreman Dave	
1997	As Good as It Gets	Handyman	
1997	The Brave Little Toaster to the Rescue	Wittgenstein	Voice
1998	The Brave Little Toaster Goes to Mars	Wittgenstein	Voice
1998	Dennis the Menace Strikes Again	Professor	Direct-to-video
1998	Dr. Dolittle	Old Beagle	Voice
1998	The Jungle Book: Mowgli's Story	Baloo	Voice
1999	Stuart Little	Cousin Edgar	
2000	Bedazzled	Priest	
2002	Snow Dogs	Ernie	
2002	A Gentleman's Game	Tomato Face	
2003	Getting Hal	Phil	
2007	Daddy Day Camp	Uncle Morty	
2007	Love Comes Lately	Boss	
2009	17 Again	The Janitor	
2012	Eye of the Hurricane	Harvey Miken	
2012	The Three Stooges	Monsignor Ratliffe	
2018	For the Fun of the Game	Himself	

=== Television ===
Year	Title	Role	Notes
1975–1976	Saturday Night Live with Howard Cosell	Various characters	Television series; television debut; also writer
1976	The TVTV Show	Various characters	
1978	Sesame Street	Man in Row Boat #2	Episode: "(#1186)"
1978–1980, 1981–1982	Saturday Night Live	Various characters	52 episodes; Also writer
1991	Good Sports	John "Mac" MacKinney	15 episodes
1990–1992	Get a Life	Gus Borden / Ted Bains	13 episodes
1992	Married... with Children	Wayne	Episode: Kelly Doesn't Live Here Anymore
1992	Wings	Coach Snyder	Television series
1992	Frosty Returns	Mr. Twitchell	Voice, television special
1992	Seinfeld	Mel Sanger	Episode: "The Bubble Boy"
1993–1994	Bakersfield P.D.	Sergeant Bill Hampton	17 episodes
1995	Lois & Clark: The New Adventures of Superman	Harlan Black	Episode: "Chi of Steel"
1995–1998	Ellen	Burt Kovak	2 episodes
1996–1997	Duckman	Agnes Delrooney	Voice, 10 episodes
1997	Nightmare Ned	Norm	Voice, episode: "My, How You've Grown"
1997	Aaahh!!! Real Monsters	Mulligan / Cop #3	Voice, episode: "The Great Escape/Beast with Four Eyes"
1997–1999	Between Brothers	Stuart Franklin	3 episodes
1998	Mr. Show with Bob and David	Referee	Episode: "It's Perfectly Understandishable"
1998	Recess	Tommy "The Tickler" Tate	Voice, episode: "Gretchen and the Secret of Yo"
1999	Smart Guy	Pete Gilroy	Episode: "Cross Talk"
1999	CatDog	Santa Claus	Voice, episode: "A Very CatDog Christmas"
1999–2000	Love & Money	Finn McBride	13 episodes
1999–present	SpongeBob SquarePants	The Flying Dutchman	Voice, 14 episodes
2000	Jackie Chan Adventures	Gnome Cop	Voice, episode: "Tough Break"
2000	Buzz Lightyear of Star Command	Panchax	Voice, episode: "Panic on Bathyos"
2000–2007	King of the Hill	Jack the Barber	Voice, 3 episodes
2000–2001	Family Guy	Salty / Bidder #2 / Luke	Voice, 3 episodes
2001	The Angry Beavers	Smelly Jim	Voice, episode: "Dag Con Carny"
2001–2006	Yes, Dear	Mr. George Savitsky	Recurring role
2002	Teamo Supremo	The Chief	Voice, 4 episodes
2003	Justice League	Artie Bauman	Voice, episode: "Eclipsed"
2005–2006	The Buzz on Maggie	Chauncey Pesky	Voice, main role
2005–2008	My Gym Partner's a Monkey	Coach Tiffany Gills	Voice, 19 episodes
2006	Tom Goes to the Mayor	Bernie Fusterillo	Voice, episode: "Zoo Trouble"
2008–2010	The Marvelous Misadventures of Flapjack	Captain K'nuckles	Voice, 69 episodes
2008	Psych	Grandpa Spencer	Episode: "The Old and the Restless"
2009	The Goode Family	Charlie	Voice, 13 episodes
2009–2018	The Middle	Don Ehlert	25 episodes
2010	WordGirl	Police officer	Voice, episode: "Earth Day Girl/A Hero, a Thief, a Store, and Its Owner"
2010	Kick Buttowski: Suburban Daredevil	Glenn	Voice, episode: "Kicked Out/Kick the Habit"
2011	Supernatural	Robert Singer	Episode: "The French Mistake"
2012	Adventure Time	Prince Huge	Voice, episode: "The Hard Easy"
2012–2013	Motorcity	Jacob, Utiliton, Giant Peanut Butter Cup	Voice, 13 episodes
2012–2014	Sullivan & Son	Hank Murphy	33 episodes
2013	Raising Hope	Walt	Episode: "Yo Zappa Do: Part 2"
2013	Fish Hooks	Baby Face Bryant	Voice, 1 episode
2014	2 Broke Girls	Blarney Bill	Episode: "And the Kilt Trip"
2014	Christmas Under Wraps	Frank Holiday	TV movie
2016	It's Always Sunny in Philadelphia	Sea Captain	Episode: "The Gang Goes to Hell: Part 1"
2016–2017	Veep	George Huntzinger	3 episodes
2017	The Daily Show with Trevor Noah	President Grandpa	Episode: "February 15, 2017"
2017	Billy Dilley's Super-Duper Subterranean Summer	Big Doug	Voice
2017	Jeff & Some Aliens	Zorby	Voice, episode: "Jeff & Some Laughs"
2017–2018	Bill Murray & Brian Doyle-Murray's Extra Innings	Himself	10 episodes
2018–2019	Lodge 49	Bob Kruger	Recurring role
2021–2022	Kamp Koral: SpongeBob's Under Years	The Flying Dutchman	Voice, 2 episodes
2021–2022	The Patrick Star Show	The Flying Dutchman	Voice, 2 episodes
2022	A Cozy Christmas Inn	Frank Holliday	TV Movie

=== Video games ===
Year	Title	Role	Notes
2001	SpongeBob SquarePants: SuperSponge	The Flying Dutchman	
2002	SpongeBob SquarePants: Employee of the Month	The Flying Dutchman	Voice only
2002	SpongeBob SquarePants: Revenge of the Flying Dutchman	The Flying Dutchman	
2003	SpongeBob SquarePants: Battle for Bikini Bottom	The Flying Dutchman	
2005	Jade Empire	Qui the Promoter	
2009	Ghostbusters: The Video Game	Mayor Jock Mulligan	
2011	Nicktoons MLB	The Flying Dutchman	
2020	SpongeBob SquarePants: Battle for Bikini Bottom – Rehydrated	The Flying Dutchman	Archival recordings
2020	SpongeBob: Patty Pursuit	The Flying Dutchman	
2023	SpongeBob SquarePants: The Cosmic Shake	The Flying Dutchman	
2023	Nickelodeon All-Star Brawl 2	The Flying Dutchman	
2025	SpongeBob SquarePants: Titans of the Tide	The Flying Dutchman	

=== Theme parks ===
Year	Title	Role	Notes
2013	SpongeBob SquarePants 4D: The Great Jelly Rescue	The Flying Dutchman (voice)	Short film

== Screenwriting credits ==
Year	Title	Notes
1973–1974	The National Lampoon Radio Hour	Radio series
1975	Saturday Night Live with Howard Cosell	Also cast member
1976	The TVTV Show	Television series
1976–1979	SCTV	Television series
1978–1982	Saturday Night Live	Also cast member Television series Nominated—Outstanding Writing in a Comedy – Variety or Music Series (1978); Nominated—Outstanding Writing in a Comedy, Variety, or Music Series (1979); Nominated—Outstanding Writing in a Variety or Music Program (1980)
1980	Caddyshack	Writer with Harold Ramis and Doug Kenney; Film
1982	The Rodney Dangerfield Show: It's Not Easy Bein' Me	Television series
1986	Club Paradise	Writer with Harold Ramis; Film; Also cast member
1993	The Chevy Chase Show	Television series
2002	The Sweet Spot	Television series

Media offices
Preceded by Charles Rocket	Weekend Update anchor 1981–1982; With: Mary Gross (1981); Christine Ebersole (1982)	Succeeded by Brad Hall
