= Saturday Night Live season 10 =

Saturday Night Live
- Season 10
- No. of episodes: 17

Release
- Original network: NBC
- Original release: October 6, 1984 – April 13, 1985

Season chronology
- ← Previous season 9 Next → season 11

The tenth season of Saturday Night Live, an American sketch comedy series, originally aired in the United States on NBC between October 6, 1984, and April 13, 1985. This was the only season to feature renowned comedians Billy Crystal, Martin Short, and Christopher Guest as cast members, and became known as the "All-Star" cast season. Only 17 episodes were produced due to a writers' strike and budget constraints. This was the final season of the Ebersol-run era.

== Opening credits ==
This season also featured a new opening sequence produced by Charlex (who also created The Cars' "You Might Think" video earlier in 1984), depicting the SNL cast as giants in and around New York City landmarks.

== Cast ==
During the previous season, Eddie Murphy left midseason. Joe Piscopo also left the show because he did not want to do it without Murphy. Dick Ebersol fired Robin Duke, Brad Hall and Tim Kazurinsky.

Ebersol and head writer Bob Tischler then wanted to "blow up" the show by adding seasoned comedians instead of newcomers. He hired Billy Crystal (who hosted twice in season 9 and was originally set to appear in SNL's first episode), Christopher Guest (a frequent contributor to The National Lampoon Radio Hour in the early 1970s), Rich Hall (best known for his work on Not Necessarily the News and the early 1980s ABC sketch show Fridays), Harry Shearer (who was a cast member on SNL in season 5), Martin Short (from SCTV) and New Zealander Pamela Stephenson (from Not the Nine O'Clock News). Stephenson beat out Geena Davis and Andrea Martin for the spot. Christopher Guest became the anchor of Saturday Night News.

In the middle of the season, Harry Shearer left the show due to "creative differences". Shearer told the AP, "I was creative, and they were different." Despite his departure, his image is still shown in the opening credits (spray-painting an elevated train as it goes down the track).

The remaining cast members left the show at the end of the season. Ebersol had been wanting to completely revamp the show to include mostly prerecorded segments. Short, Guest, and Hall ultimately grew tired of the show's demanding production schedule and showed little interest in returning for another season, leaving Crystal the only "A-cast" member available for season 11. Like Lorne Michaels at the end of season 5, Ebersol considered taking the show off the air for several months to re-cast. Another idea was to institute a permanent rotation of hosts (Billy Crystal, David Letterman and Joe Piscopo) for "a hip The Ed Sullivan Show". NBC decided to continue production only if they could get Michaels to produce again. Ebersol, along with his writing staff and most of the cast, left the show after this season. Those who wished to stay, such as Crystal and Kroeger, were not rehired for the following season.

=== Cast roster ===
Repertory players

- Jim Belushi
- Billy Crystal
- Mary Gross
- **Christopher Guest**
- Rich Hall
- Gary Kroeger
- Julia Louis-Dreyfus
- Harry Shearer (final episode: January 12, 1985)
- Martin Short
- Pamela Stephenson

bold denotes Weekend Update anchor

== Writers ==
Billy Crystal, Christopher Guest, Rich Hall, Rob Riley, and Martin Short joined the writing staff. Jim Downey, Herb Sargent, and Harry Shearer rejoined the staff after a four-year hiatus. Robin Duke, Adam Green, Tim Kazurinsky, Michael McCartney, Eddie Murphy, Pamela Norris, and Joe Piscopo left the staff.

This season's writers were Jim Belushi, Andy Breckman, Billy Crystal, Jim Downey, Christopher Guest, Rich Hall, Nate Herman, Kevin Kelton, Andy Kurtzman, Margaret Oberman, Rob Riley, Herb Sargent, Harry Shearer, Martin Short, Andrew Smith, Bob Tischler and Eliot Wald. The head writer was Bob Tischler.

Larry David spent one season on the writing staff. He described this period as a miserable experience due to his conflicts with Dick Ebersol and being able to get only one sketch on the air, which aired in the final moments of Episode 7. He would later take some of his unused ideas and work them into his show Seinfeld. David would return to host SNL in 2017 and to portray Bernie Sanders.

Nearly everyone on the writing staff left at the end of the season, except for Herb Sargent and Jim Downey (Downey would be promoted to head writer next season).

== Episodes ==
No. overall	No. in season	Host(s)	Musical guest(s)	Original release date
179	1	(none)	Thompson Twins	October 6, 1984
The Thompson Twins performs "Hold Me Now" and "The Gap".; Billy Crystal (as Fernando) and Julia Louis-Dreyfus anchor Saturday Night News.; Contains the first appearance of Ed Grimley on SNL, as well as the "Synchronized Swimming" sketch.; Billy Crystal, Christopher Guest, Rich Hall, Martin Short and Pamela Stephenson's first episode as cast members.; Harry Shearer rejoins the cast after a four-year hiatus.
180	2	Bob Uecker	Peter Wolf	October 13, 1984
Peter Wolf performs "Lights Out" and "I Need You Tonight".; Bob Uecker anchors Saturday Night News.; Guest appearance by Yogi Berra.; The first animated short, Tippi Turtle (voiced by Christopher Guest), debuts on the show.
181	3	Jesse Jackson	Andrae Crouch; Wintley Phipps	October 20, 1984
Jesse Jackson performs "Red Rubber Ball" and "Jean".; Andrae Crouch performs "Right Now" and Wintley Phipps performs "Tell Me Again".; The first appearance of Willie and Frankie.; Jesse Jackson anchors Saturday Night News.
182	4	Michael McKean	Chaka Khan; The Folksmen	November 3, 1984
Chaka Khan performs "I Feel for You" and "This Is My Night".; Shelia E. was originally announced as the musical guest for this episode, but was replaced by Chaka Khan.; Edwin Newman anchors Saturday Night News.; Cameraman Bobby Fraraccio fills in for Barry Manilow on "Fernando's Hideaway".; Contains the first appearance as the faux-folk group The Folksmen (Christopher Guest, Michael McKean and Harry Shearer), performing their "hit", "Old Joe's Place" (in addition to a pre-taped segment featuring the band's "reunion"). The Folksmen appeared 19 years later in the film A Mighty Wind.; Larry David appears off-camera during the monologue as a heckler.; Jim Belushi was missing from this episode, as mentioned by McKean during the goodnights.; Michael McKean joined the cast of SNL 10 years later at the end of season 19, making him one of only two people to be a host, musical guest (as part of Spinal Tap in season 9) and cast member of SNL (Dan Aykroyd being the other).
183	5	George Carlin	Frankie Goes to Hollywood	November 10, 1984
Frankie Goes to Hollywood performs "Two Tribes" and "Born to Run".; George Carlin anchors Saturday Night News.
184	6	Ed Asner	The Kinks	November 17, 1984
The Kinks performs "Do It Again" and "Word of Mouth".; Bill Murray was originally announced as the host, but backed out and was replaced by Ed Asner.; Ed Asner anchors Saturday Night News.
185	7	Ed Begley, Jr.	Billy Squier	December 1, 1984
Billy Squier performs "Rock Me Tonite" and "All Night Long".; This episode contains the sole sketch Larry David got on the air.; Christopher Guest's first episode as Saturday Night News anchor.
186	8	Ringo Starr	Herbie Hancock	December 8, 1984
Herbie Hancock performs "Junku" and "Rockit".; This is the only episode of the series not to have a news segment, like "Saturday Night News", as it was known then.; Cameo by Barbara Bach, wife of host Ringo Starr.
187	9	Eddie Murphy	The Honeydrippers	December 15, 1984
The Honeydrippers performs "Rockin' at Midnight" and "Santa Claus Is Back in Town".; Murphy's last appearance on the show until hosting again during the forty-fifth season in 2019 (not counting a brief appearance during the 40th Anniversary Special in 2015). Larry David also appears in the 2019 episode.
188	10	Kathleen Turner	John Waite	January 12, 1985
John Waite performs "Saturday Night".; Harry Shearer's final episode as a cast member.
189	11	Roy Scheider	Billy Ocean	January 19, 1985
Billy Ocean performs "Caribbean Queen" and "Loverboy".
190	12	Alex Karras	Tina Turner	February 2, 1985
Tina Turner performs "What's Love Got to Do with It," "Better Be Good to Me" and "Private Dancer". Turner also appears in an Ed Grimley sketch.
191	13	Harry Anderson	Bryan Adams	February 9, 1985
Bryan Adams performs "Somebody" and "Run to You".; Carol Burnett, Johnny Cash, Waylon Jennings, Christopher Reeve and Marty Stuart appear in the audience.
192	14	Pamela Sue Martin	Power Station	February 16, 1985
Power Station performs "Some Like It Hot" (which features future SNL band member Lenny Pickett on saxophone) and "Get It On (Bang a Gong)". This would be the Power Station's only live performance with Robert Palmer as lead singer.; Pre-recorded guest appearances by Ann-Margret, Morgan Fairchild, Teri Garr, Susan Lucci and Lynn Swann.; This episode does not contain a cold open.; At the end of the episode, Crystal announces that John Candy and Eugene Levy would be hosting next week's episode and the musical guest would be Hall & Oates. Due to a writers' strike looming, the episode was pulled. Candy wouldn't host again and Hall & Oates has yet to return while Levy has never hosted.
193	15	Mr. T Hulk Hogan	The Commodores	March 30, 1985
The Commodores perform "Nightshift" and "Animal Instinct".; Guest appearances by Steve Landesberg, Liberace, Rowdy Roddy Piper and Bob Orton, Jr.
194	16	Christopher Reeve	Santana	April 6, 1985
Santana performs "Say It Again" and "Right Now".; Guest appearance by Steven Wright.; Late Night with David Letterman regular Calvert DeForest appears in an audience cameo during Saturday Night News.; Contain the "Jackie Rogers, Jr's $100,000 Jackpot Wad" sketch.
195	17	Howard Cosell	Greg Kihn	April 13, 1985
Greg Kihn performs "Boys Won't" and "Lucky".; Jim Belushi, Billy Crystal, Mary Gross, Christopher Guest, Rich Hall, Gary Kroeger, Julia Louis-Dreyfus, Martin Short and Pamela Stephenson's final episode as cast members.; Guest's final episode as Saturday Night News anchor.; Dick Ebersol's final episode as executive producer.

== Canceled episodes with booked guests ==
Airdate	Host	Musical Guest	Comments
March 9, 1985	Eugene Levy & John Candy	Daryl Hall & John Oates	This episode was announced during the SNL Film Festival special the previous week, when Levy and Candy made a cameo in a sketch with Billy Crystal, but was canceled due to 1985 writers strike. Levy would later make a guest appearance when his son Dan Levy hosted SNL in February 2021.
March 16, 1985	Steve Landesberg	[none]	Steve Landesberg was supposed to host on St. Patrick's Day, but was canceled due to 1985 writers strike, and was reported to be sick during the week. However, he was a special guest in the March 30 episode two weeks after the strike with hosts Mr.T and Hulk Hogan.

== Specials ==
Title	Original release date
"SNL Film Festival"	March 2, 1985
Hosted by Billy Crystal, presenting short films and commercial parodies. Eddie Murphy, Joe Piscopo, Robin Williams, Tim Kazurinsky, and Stevie Wonder make appearances in pre-recorded segments from previous seasons. Gene Siskel and Roger Ebert review the show. John Candy and Eugene Levy make a cameo to announce next week's show with musical guests Hall & Oates. The episode was ultimately cancelled due to a writers' strike.
"The Best of John Belushi"	August 3, 1985
The special included material featuring John Belushi during his stint on the show. Sketches include "Sam Peckinpah," "Beethoven Composes 'My Girl'," "Beethoven Composes 'What'd I Say'," "Vito Corleone in Therapy," "Samurai Deli," "Wilderness Comedian," "The Last Voyage of the Starship Enterprise," "The Bee Honeymooners," "Dragnet," "The Tomorrow Show with Tom Snyder," "Mussolini Reenactment," "Little Chocolate Donuts," "Olympia Cafe," "Don't Look Back In Anger," "The Academy Awards," "Superhero Party," and "Miles Cowperthwaite, Part Two: I Am Nailed to the Hull." The special also features musical numbers Belushi performs on the show: Belushi as Joe Cocker performs "With a Little Help from My Friends" and The Blues Brothers performs "King Bee," "Soul Man," and "B-Movie Boxcar Blues".
