= The Nerds =

Saturday Night Live recurring sketch

"The Nerds" is a series of sketches on American sketch comedy series Saturday Night Live. The protagonists of the sketch are Lisa Loopner (played by Gilda Radner) and Todd DiLaMuca (played by Bill Murray), whose repartée with one another would be the focus of the sketch, and regular character Mrs. Enid Loopner (played by Jane Curtin), Lisa's mother, in whose home the sketches were usually set. Virtually all the time Mrs. Loopner, a widow, would wear a housecoat. She often referred to her "wifely duties" concerning her late husband (who was born without a spine), and told Lisa Loopner to "...go warm up the Gremlin..." before they went out somewhere.

Todd would often give Lisa noogies by getting her in a headlock and knocking her on the top of the head, and a regular element of the sketches would be Todd making fun of her flat chest. He'd look down her shirt to see whether there were "any new developments" and then make a disparaging comment such as "Better put some Band-Aids on those mosquito bites," to which Lisa's weary reply was often "That's so funny I forgot to laugh," or "The last time I heard that I fell off my dinosaur". Lisa also addressed Todd affectionately as "Pizza Face."

Todd's name was originally given as "Todd LaBounta", but was changed in later sketches after legal action was threatened by a real person with that name. When the earlier LaBounta "Nerd" sketches were re-run on repeat SNL broadcasts, the audio was re-edited so that Todd's last name was not heard.

Guest stars included Michael Palin, who played Mr. Brighton, Lisa's piano teacher with an uncontrollable libido, in two sketches; Buck Henry as Todd's father, Marshall; and Steve Martin as Todd's rival Chas the Spaz.

In 1979, the series producers came up with a sketch in the series titled "Nerds' Nativity". Intended to be aired three days before Christmas Day, the sketch was a source of friction between the show's producer, Lorne Michaels, and NBC's standards department. The standards department contended that it was inappropriate to spoof the nativity of Jesus; the producer countered that in fact the sketch was spoofing nativity plays. In the end, the sketch was broadcast, although with some of the dialogue cut, resulting in viewers sending letters of complaint to the program.

== See also ==
- List of recurring Saturday Night Live characters and sketches
