= Lists of Saturday Night Live episodes =

Current logo of Saturday Night Live since season 50

Saturday Night Live (SNL) is an American late-night sketch comedy and variety show created by Lorne Michaels. It premiered on NBC on October 11, 1975, under the title NBC's Saturday Night. The show often satirizes contemporary American popular culture and politics. Saturday Night Live features a two-tiered cast: the repertory members, also known as the "Not Ready for Prime Time Players", and newer cast members, known as "Featured Players". Each week, the show features a host, often a well-known celebrity, who delivers an opening monologue and performs in sketches with the cast. A musical guest is also invited to perform several sets (usually two, occasionally more). Every so often a host or musical guest fills both roles. With the exception of season 7 and several other rare cases, the show begins with a cold open that ends with someone breaking character and proclaiming "Live from New York, it's Saturday Night!"

Saturday Night Live is one of the longest-running network programs in American television history, with more than 1000 episodes broadcast over five decades. A number of the show's sketches have been developed into feature films, including The Blues Brothers, Wayne's World, A Night at the Roxbury, Superstar, Coneheads, It's Pat, The Ladies Man and MacGruber.

Seasons 1 through 5 are available on DVD in Region 1. Various Saturday Night Live sketches are available in several new media formats, including streaming on Hulu and Netflix. YouTube SNL playlists of individual sketches and segments are available for many SNL episodes, via the show's official YouTube channel. Best-of compilations are for sale through digital video retailers. As of October 1, 2020, the full catalogue of Saturday Night Live episodes is available on the streaming service Peacock, updated actively as new episodes release.

Seasons: 1 | 2 | 3 | 4 | 5 | 6 | 7 | 8 | 9 | 10 | 11 | 12 | 13 | 14 | 15 | 16 | 17 | 18 | 19 | 20 | 21 | 22 | 23 | 24 | 25 | 26 | 27 | 28 | 29 | 30 | 31 | 32 | 33 | 34 | 35 | 36 | 37 | 38 | 39 | 40 | 41 | 42 | 43 | 44 | 45 | 46 | 47 | 48 | 49 | 50 | 51 | 52 | Specials | References

Season	Episodes	Originally released	
Season	Episodes	First released	Last released
1	24	October 11, 1975	July 31, 1976
2	22	September 18, 1976	May 21, 1977
3	20	September 24, 1977	May 20, 1978
4	20	October 7, 1978	May 26, 1979
5	20	October 13, 1979	May 24, 1980
6	13 (Note: Number of episodes reduced due to executive producer Lorne Michaels taking a year off and the 1981 Writers Guild of America strike)	November 15, 1980	April 11, 1981
7	20	October 3, 1981	May 22, 1982
8	20	September 25, 1982	May 14, 1983
9	19	October 8, 1983	May 12, 1984
10	17 (Note: Only 17 episodes were produced due to a writers' strike and budget constraint)	October 6, 1984	April 13, 1985
11	18	November 9, 1985	May 24, 1986
12	20	October 11, 1986	May 23, 1987
13	13 (Note: Number of episodes reduced due to the 1988 Writers Guild of America strike)	October 17, 1987	February 27, 1988
14	20	October 8, 1988	May 20, 1989
15	20	September 30, 1989	May 19, 1990
16	20	September 29, 1990	May 18, 1991
17	20	September 28, 1991	May 16, 1992
18	20	September 26, 1992	May 15, 1993
19	20	September 25, 1993	May 14, 1994
20	20	September 24, 1994	May 13, 1995
21	20	September 30, 1995	May 18, 1996
22	20	September 28, 1996	May 17, 1997
23	20	September 27, 1997	May 9, 1998
24	19	September 26, 1998	May 15, 1999
25	20	October 2, 1999	May 20, 2000
26	20	October 7, 2000	May 19, 2001
27	20	September 29, 2001	May 18, 2002
28	20	October 5, 2002	May 17, 2003
29	20	October 4, 2003	May 15, 2004
30	20	October 2, 2004	May 21, 2005
31	19	October 1, 2005	May 20, 2006
32	20	September 30, 2006	May 19, 2007
33	12 (Note: Number of episodes reduced due to the 2007–08 Writers Guild of America strike)	September 29, 2007	May 17, 2008
34	22	September 13, 2008	May 16, 2009
35	22	September 26, 2009	May 15, 2010
36	22	September 25, 2010	May 21, 2011
37	22	September 24, 2011	May 19, 2012
38	21	September 15, 2012	May 18, 2013
39	21	September 28, 2013	May 17, 2014
40	21	September 27, 2014	May 16, 2015
41	21	October 3, 2015	May 21, 2016
42	21	October 1, 2016	May 20, 2017
43	21	September 30, 2017	May 19, 2018
44	21	September 29, 2018	May 18, 2019
45	18 (Note: Number of episodes reduced due to the breakout of the COVID-19 pandemic)	September 28, 2019	May 9, 2020
46	20	October 3, 2020	May 22, 2021
47	21	October 2, 2021	May 21, 2022
48	18 (Note: Number of episodes reduced due to the 2023 Writers Guild of America strike)	October 1, 2022	April 15, 2023
49	20	October 14, 2023	May 18, 2024
50	20	September 28, 2024	May 17, 2025
51	20	October 4, 2025	May 16, 2026
52	20	September 26, 2026	May 15, 2027
