= List of Saturday Night Live episodes (season 31–present) =

Airings of the NBC variety show from 2005 onward

Current logo of Saturday Night Live since season 50

Saturday Night Live (SNL) is an American late-night sketch comedy and variety show created by Lorne Michaels. It premiered on NBC on October 11, 1975, under the title NBC's Saturday Night. The show often satirizes contemporary American popular culture and politics. Saturday Night Live features a two-tiered cast: the repertory members, also known as the "Not Ready for Prime Time Players", and newer cast members, known as "Featured Players". Each week, the show features a host, often a well-known celebrity, who delivers an opening monologue and performs in sketches with the cast. A musical guest is also invited to perform several sets (usually two, occasionally more). Every so often a host or musical guest fills both roles. With the exception of season 7 and several other rare cases, the show begins with a cold open that ends with someone breaking character and proclaiming "Live from New York, it's Saturday Night!"

Saturday Night Live is one of the longest-running network programs in American television history, with more than 1000 episodes broadcast over five decades. A number of the show's sketches have been developed into feature films, including The Blues Brothers, Wayne's World, A Night at the Roxbury, Superstar, Coneheads, It's Pat, The Ladies Man and MacGruber.

Seasons 1 through 5 are available on DVD in Region 1. Various Saturday Night Live sketches are available in several new media formats, including streaming on Hulu and Netflix. YouTube SNL playlists of individual sketches and segments are available for many SNL episodes, via the show's official YouTube channel. Best-of compilations are for sale through digital video retailers. As of October 1, 2020, the full catalogue of Saturday Night Live episodes is available on the streaming service Peacock, updated actively as new episodes release.

Season	Episodes	Originally released	
Season	Episodes	First released	Last released
1	24	October 11, 1975	July 31, 1976
2	22	September 18, 1976	May 21, 1977
3	20	September 24, 1977	May 20, 1978
4	20	October 7, 1978	May 26, 1979
5	20	October 13, 1979	May 24, 1980
6	13 (Note: Number of episodes reduced due to executive producer Lorne Michaels taking a year off and the 1981 Writers Guild of America strike)	November 15, 1980	April 11, 1981
7	20	October 3, 1981	May 22, 1982
8	20	September 25, 1982	May 14, 1983
9	19	October 8, 1983	May 12, 1984
10	17 (Note: Only 17 episodes were produced due to a writers' strike and budget constraint)	October 6, 1984	April 13, 1985
11	18	November 9, 1985	May 24, 1986
12	20	October 11, 1986	May 23, 1987
13	13 (Note: Number of episodes reduced due to the 1988 Writers Guild of America strike)	October 17, 1987	February 27, 1988
14	20	October 8, 1988	May 20, 1989
15	20	September 30, 1989	May 19, 1990
16	20	September 29, 1990	May 18, 1991
17	20	September 28, 1991	May 16, 1992
18	20	September 26, 1992	May 15, 1993
19	20	September 25, 1993	May 14, 1994
20	20	September 24, 1994	May 13, 1995
21	20	September 30, 1995	May 18, 1996
22	20	September 28, 1996	May 17, 1997
23	20	September 27, 1997	May 9, 1998
24	19	September 26, 1998	May 15, 1999
25	20	October 2, 1999	May 20, 2000
26	20	October 7, 2000	May 19, 2001
27	20	September 29, 2001	May 18, 2002
28	20	October 5, 2002	May 17, 2003
29	20	October 4, 2003	May 15, 2004
30	20	October 2, 2004	May 21, 2005
31	19	October 1, 2005	May 20, 2006
32	20	September 30, 2006	May 19, 2007
33	12 (Note: Number of episodes reduced due to the 2007–08 Writers Guild of America strike)	September 29, 2007	May 17, 2008
34	22	September 13, 2008	May 16, 2009
35	22	September 26, 2009	May 15, 2010
36	22	September 25, 2010	May 21, 2011
37	22	September 24, 2011	May 19, 2012
38	21	September 15, 2012	May 18, 2013
39	21	September 28, 2013	May 17, 2014
40	21	September 27, 2014	May 16, 2015
41	21	October 3, 2015	May 21, 2016
42	21	October 1, 2016	May 20, 2017
43	21	September 30, 2017	May 19, 2018
44	21	September 29, 2018	May 18, 2019
45	18 (Note: Number of episodes reduced due to the breakout of the COVID-19 pandemic)	September 28, 2019	May 9, 2020
46	20	October 3, 2020	May 22, 2021
47	21	October 2, 2021	May 21, 2022
48	18 (Note: Number of episodes reduced due to the 2023 Writers Guild of America strike)	October 1, 2022	April 15, 2023
49	20	October 14, 2023	May 18, 2024
50	20	September 28, 2024	May 17, 2025
51	20	October 4, 2025	May 16, 2026
52	TBA	September 26, 2026	TBA

== Episodes ==
=== Season 31 (2005–06) ===
No. overall	No. in season	Host	Musical guest	Original release date
586	1	Steve Carell	Kanye West	October 1, 2005
587	2	Jon Heder	Ashlee Simpson	October 8, 2005
588	3	Catherine Zeta-Jones	Franz Ferdinand	October 22, 2005
589	4	Lance Armstrong	Sheryl Crow	October 29, 2005
590	5	Jason Lee	Foo Fighters	November 12, 2005
591	6	Eva Longoria	Korn	November 19, 2005
592	7	Dane Cook	James Blunt	December 3, 2005
593	8	Alec Baldwin	Shakira	December 10, 2005
594	9	Jack Black	Neil Young	December 17, 2005
595	10	Scarlett Johansson	Death Cab for Cutie	January 14, 2006
596	11	Peter Sarsgaard	The Strokes	January 21, 2006
597	12	Steve Martin	Prince	February 4, 2006
598	13	Natalie Portman	Fall Out Boy	March 4, 2006
599	14	Matt Dillon	Arctic Monkeys	March 11, 2006
600	15	Antonio Banderas	Mary J. Blige	April 8, 2006
601	16	Lindsay Lohan	Pearl Jam	April 15, 2006
602	17	Tom Hanks	Red Hot Chili Peppers	May 6, 2006
603	18	Julia Louis-Dreyfus	Paul Simon	May 13, 2006
604	19	Kevin Spacey	Nelly Furtado	May 20, 2006

=== Season 32 (2006–07) ===
No. overall	No. in season	Host	Musical guest(s)	Original release date
605	1	Dane Cook	The Killers	September 30, 2006
606	2	Jaime Pressly	Corinne Bailey Rae	October 7, 2006
607	3	John C. Reilly	My Chemical Romance	October 21, 2006
608	4	Hugh Laurie	Beck	October 28, 2006
609	5	Alec Baldwin	Christina Aguilera	November 11, 2006
610	6	Ludacris	Ludacris	November 18, 2006
611	7	Matthew Fox	Tenacious D	December 2, 2006
612	8	Annette Bening	Gwen Stefani; Akon	December 9, 2006
613	9	Justin Timberlake	Justin Timberlake	December 16, 2006
614	10	Jake Gyllenhaal	The Shins	January 13, 2007
615	11	Jeremy Piven	AFI	January 20, 2007
616	12	Drew Barrymore	Lily Allen	February 3, 2007
617	13	Forest Whitaker	Keith Urban	February 10, 2007
618	14	Rainn Wilson	Arcade Fire	February 24, 2007
619	15	Julia Louis-Dreyfus	Snow Patrol	March 17, 2007
620	16	Peyton Manning	Carrie Underwood	March 24, 2007
621	17	Shia LaBeouf	Avril Lavigne	April 14, 2007
622	18	Scarlett Johansson	Björk	April 21, 2007
623	19	Molly Shannon	Linkin Park	May 12, 2007
624	20	Zach Braff	Maroon 5	May 19, 2007

=== Season 33 (2007–08) ===
No. overall	No. in season	Host	Musical guest	Original release date
625	1	LeBron James	Kanye West	September 29, 2007
626	2	Seth Rogen	Spoon	October 6, 2007
627	3	Jon Bon Jovi	Foo Fighters	October 13, 2007
628	4	Brian Williams	Feist	November 3, 2007
629	5	Tina Fey	Carrie Underwood	February 23, 2008
630	6	Ellen Page	Wilco	March 1, 2008
631	7	Amy Adams	Vampire Weekend	March 8, 2008
632	8	Jonah Hill	Mariah Carey	March 15, 2008
633	9	Christopher Walken	Panic! at the Disco	April 5, 2008
634	10	Ashton Kutcher	Gnarls Barkley	April 12, 2008
635	11	Shia LaBeouf	My Morning Jacket	May 10, 2008
636	12	Steve Carell	Usher	May 17, 2008

=== Season 34 (2008–09) ===
No. overall	No. in season	Host	Musical guest(s)	Original release date	Ratings/ Share
637	1	Michael Phelps	Lil Wayne	September 13, 2008	7.4/18
638	2	James Franco	Kings of Leon	September 20, 2008	8.5/18
639	3	Anna Faris	Duffy	September 27, 2008	6.0/15
640	4	Anne Hathaway	The Killers	October 4, 2008	7.4/18
641	5	Josh Brolin	Adele	October 18, 2008	10.7/24
642	6	Jon Hamm	Coldplay	October 25, 2008	7.1/18
643	7	Ben Affleck	David Cook	November 1, 2008	9.0/20
644	8	Paul Rudd	Beyoncé	November 15, 2008	6.8/21
645	9	Tim McGraw	Ludacris & T-Pain	November 22, 2008	5.9/16
646	10	John Malkovich	T.I.	December 6, 2008	7.3/20
647	11	Hugh Laurie	Kanye West	December 13, 2008	7.4/22
648	12	Neil Patrick Harris	Taylor Swift	January 10, 2009	9.5/24
649	13	Rosario Dawson	Fleet Foxes	January 17, 2009	6.6/16
650	14	Steve Martin	Jason Mraz	January 31, 2009	6.4/15
651	15	Bradley Cooper	TV on the Radio	February 7, 2009	5.8/12
652	16	Alec Baldwin	Jonas Brothers	February 14, 2009	7.1/19
653	17	Dwayne Johnson	Ray LaMontagne	March 7, 2009	6.8/17
654	18	Tracy Morgan	Kelly Clarkson	March 14, 2009	7.6/21
655	19	Seth Rogen	Phoenix	April 4, 2009	5.5/12
656	20	Zac Efron	Yeah Yeah Yeahs	April 11, 2009	5.1
657	21	Justin Timberlake	Ciara	May 9, 2009	6.0
658	22	Will Ferrell	Green Day	May 16, 2009	5.7

=== Season 35 (2009–10) ===
No. overall	No. in season	Host	Musical guest	Original release date	Ratings/ Share
659	1	Megan Fox	U2	September 26, 2009	4.6/11
660	2	Ryan Reynolds	Lady Gaga	October 3, 2009	4.7/12
661	3	Drew Barrymore	Regina Spektor	October 10, 2009	4.6/11
662	4	Gerard Butler	Shakira	October 17, 2009	4.8/11
663	5	Taylor Swift	Taylor Swift	November 7, 2009	5.0/12
664	6	January Jones	Black Eyed Peas	November 14, 2009	4.7/12
665	7	Joseph Gordon-Levitt	Dave Matthews Band	November 21, 2009	4.3/11
666	8	Blake Lively	Rihanna	December 5, 2009	4.4/12
667	9	Taylor Lautner	Bon Jovi	December 12, 2009	5.1/12
668	10	James Franco	Muse	December 19, 2009	4.4/11
669	11	Charles Barkley	Alicia Keys	January 9, 2010	4.4/19
670	12	Sigourney Weaver	The Ting Tings	January 16, 2010	5.4/14
671	13	Jon Hamm	Michael Bublé	January 30, 2010	5.0/12
672	14	Ashton Kutcher	Them Crooked Vultures	February 6, 2010	5.3/13
673	15	Jennifer Lopez	Jennifer Lopez	February 27, 2010	6.3/15
674	16	Zach Galifianakis	Vampire Weekend	March 6, 2010	5.0/12
675	17	Jude Law	Pearl Jam	March 13, 2010	4.5/11
676	18	Tina Fey	Justin Bieber	April 10, 2010	5.7/14
677	19	Ryan Phillippe	Kesha	April 17, 2010	5.2/13
678	20	Gabourey Sidibe	MGMT	April 24, 2010	4.7/12
679	21	Betty White	Jay-Z	May 8, 2010	8.8/21
680	22	Alec Baldwin	Tom Petty and the Heartbreakers	May 15, 2010	5.8/14

=== Season 36 (2010–11) ===
No. overall	No. in season	Host	Musical guest(s)	Original release date	Ratings/ Share
681	1	Amy Poehler	Katy Perry	September 25, 2010	5.3/13
682	2	Bryan Cranston	Kanye West	October 2, 2010	4.8/12
683	3	Jane Lynch	Bruno Mars	October 9, 2010	4.8/12
684	4	Emma Stone	Kings of Leon	October 23, 2010	4.5/11
685	5	Jon Hamm	Rihanna	October 30, 2010	4.6/11
686	6	Scarlett Johansson	Arcade Fire	November 13, 2010	4.7/12
687	7	Anne Hathaway	Florence + the Machine	November 20, 2010	4.7/12
688	8	Robert De Niro	Diddy-Dirty Money	December 4, 2010	5.0/12
689	9	Paul Rudd	Paul McCartney	December 11, 2010	5.3/13
690	10	Jeff Bridges	Eminem & Lil Wayne	December 18, 2010	4.9/12
691	11	Jim Carrey	The Black Keys	January 8, 2011	7.8/18
692	12	Gwyneth Paltrow	Cee Lo Green	January 15, 2011	5.1/12
693	13	Jesse Eisenberg	Nicki Minaj	January 29, 2011	5.1/12
694	14	Dana Carvey	Linkin Park	February 5, 2011	5.6/13
695	15	Russell Brand	Chris Brown	February 12, 2011	5.0/12
696	16	Miley Cyrus	The Strokes	March 5, 2011	5.4/13
697	17	Zach Galifianakis	Jessie J	March 12, 2011	4.8/12
698	18	Elton John	Elton John	April 2, 2011	5.0/12
699	19	Helen Mirren	Foo Fighters	April 9, 2011	4.7/12
700	20	Tina Fey	Ellie Goulding	May 7, 2011	5.3/15
701	21	Ed Helms	Paul Simon	May 14, 2011	4.9/12
702	22	Justin Timberlake	Lady Gaga	May 21, 2011	7.0/17

=== Season 37 (2011–12) ===
No. overall	No. in season	Host	Musical guest(s)	Original release date	Ratings/ Share
703	1	Alec Baldwin	Radiohead	September 24, 2011	5.0/13
704	2	Melissa McCarthy	Lady Antebellum	October 1, 2011	5.2/13
705	3	Ben Stiller	Foster the People	October 8, 2011	4.8/12
706	4	Anna Faris	Drake	October 15, 2011	4.8/12
707	5	Charlie Day	Maroon 5	November 5, 2011	4.9/11
708	6	Emma Stone	Coldplay	November 12, 2011	4.5/11
709	7	Jason Segel	Florence + The Machine	November 19, 2011	4.6/11
710	8	Steve Buscemi	The Black Keys	December 3, 2011	4.8/11
711	9	Katy Perry	Robyn	December 10, 2011	4.8/11
712	10	Jimmy Fallon	Michael Bublé	December 17, 2011	5.3/13
713	11	Charles Barkley	Kelly Clarkson	January 7, 2012	7.4/18
714	12	Daniel Radcliffe	Lana Del Rey	January 14, 2012	5.2/12
715	13	Channing Tatum	Bon Iver	February 4, 2012	4.7/11
716	14	Zooey Deschanel	Karmin	February 11, 2012	5.0/12
717	15	Maya Rudolph	Sleigh Bells	February 18, 2012	4.9/12
718	16	Lindsay Lohan	Jack White	March 3, 2012	5.5/14
719	17	Jonah Hill	The Shins	March 10, 2012	4.3/11
720	18	Sofía Vergara	One Direction	April 7, 2012	5.0/16
721	19	Josh Brolin	Gotye	April 14, 2012	4.6/11
722	20	Eli Manning	Rihanna	May 5, 2012	5.2/13
723	21	Will Ferrell	Usher	May 12, 2012	5.1/13
724	22	Mick Jagger	Mick Jagger (with Arcade Fire, Foo Fighters, Jeff Beck)	May 19, 2012	5.2/13

=== Season 38 (2012–13) ===
No. overall	No. in season	Host	Musical guest(s)	Original release date	Ratings/ Share
725	1	Seth MacFarlane	Frank Ocean	September 15, 2012	4.8/12
726	2	Joseph Gordon-Levitt	Mumford & Sons	September 22, 2012	5.0/12
727	3	Daniel Craig	Muse	October 6, 2012	4.5/11
728	4	Christina Applegate	Passion Pit	October 13, 2012	4.6/11
729	5	Bruno Mars	Bruno Mars	October 20, 2012	5.4/14
730	6	Louis C.K.	fun.	November 3, 2012	5.0/12
731	7	Anne Hathaway	Rihanna	November 10, 2012	5.0/12
732	8	Jeremy Renner	Maroon 5	November 17, 2012	5.1/12
733	9	Jamie Foxx	Ne-Yo	December 8, 2012	4.6/11
734	10	Martin Short	Paul McCartney	December 15, 2012	5.1/12
735	11	Jennifer Lawrence	The Lumineers	January 19, 2013	4.9/12
736	12	Adam Levine	Kendrick Lamar	January 26, 2013	5.0/12
737	13	Justin Bieber	Justin Bieber	February 9, 2013	4.9/12
738	14	Christoph Waltz	Alabama Shakes	February 16, 2013	4.6/12
739	15	Kevin Hart	Macklemore and Ryan Lewis	March 2, 2013	4.8/12
740	16	Justin Timberlake	Justin Timberlake	March 9, 2013	5.9/15
741	17	Melissa McCarthy	Phoenix	April 6, 2013	4.8/12
742	18	Vince Vaughn	Miguel	April 13, 2013	4.6/12
743	19	Zach Galifianakis	Of Monsters and Men	May 4, 2013	4.4/11
744	20	Kristen Wiig	Vampire Weekend	May 11, 2013	4.6/12
745	21	Ben Affleck	Kanye West	May 18, 2013	4.7/12

=== Season 39 (2013–14) ===
No. overall	No. in season	Host	Musical guest	Original release date	Ratings/ Share
746	1	Tina Fey	Arcade Fire	September 28, 2013	4.7/12
747	2	Miley Cyrus	Miley Cyrus	October 5, 2013	4.5/13
748	3	Bruce Willis	Katy Perry	October 12, 2013	4.3/11
749	4	Edward Norton	Janelle Monáe	October 26, 2013	3.9/10
750	5	Kerry Washington	Eminem	November 2, 2013	4.9/12
751	6	Lady Gaga	Lady Gaga	November 16, 2013	4.9/12
752	7	Josh Hutcherson	HAIM	November 23, 2013	4.1/10
753	8	Paul Rudd	One Direction	December 7, 2013	4.9/12
754	9	John Goodman	Kings of Leon	December 14, 2013	4.5/11
755	10	Jimmy Fallon	Justin Timberlake	December 21, 2013	6.3/16
756	11	Drake	Drake	January 18, 2014	4.7/12
757	12	Jonah Hill	Bastille	January 25, 2014	4.8/12
758	13	Melissa McCarthy	Imagine Dragons	February 1, 2014	5.4/13
759	14	Jim Parsons	Beck	March 1, 2014	4.6/12
760	15	Lena Dunham	The National	March 8, 2014	4.1/11
761	16	Louis C.K.	Sam Smith	March 29, 2014	4.0/10
762	17	Anna Kendrick	Pharrell Williams	April 5, 2014	4.0/10
763	18	Seth Rogen	Ed Sheeran	April 12, 2014	3.9/10
764	19	Andrew Garfield	Coldplay	May 3, 2014	3.9/10
765	20	Charlize Theron	The Black Keys	May 10, 2014	3.8/10
766	21	Andy Samberg	St. Vincent	May 17, 2014	4.0/10

=== Season 40 (2014–15) ===
No. overall	No. in season	Host	Musical guest(s)	Original release date	Ratings/ Share
767	1	Chris Pratt	Ariana Grande	September 27, 2014	4.0/10
768	2	Sarah Silverman	Maroon 5	October 4, 2014	3.9/10
769	3	Bill Hader	Hozier	October 11, 2014	3.8/10
770	4	Jim Carrey	Iggy Azalea	October 25, 2014	4.1/10
771	5	Chris Rock	Prince	November 1, 2014	4.9/10
772	6	Woody Harrelson	Kendrick Lamar	November 15, 2014	4.1/10
773	7	Cameron Diaz	Mark Ronson & Bruno Mars	November 22, 2014	4.1/10
774	8	James Franco	Nicki Minaj	December 6, 2014	4.4/10
775	9	Martin Freeman	Charli XCX	December 13, 2014	3.9/10
776	10	Amy Adams	One Direction	December 20, 2014	4.0/10
777	11	Kevin Hart	Sia	January 17, 2015	4.1/10
778	12	Blake Shelton	Blake Shelton	January 24, 2015	4.7/10
779	13	J. K. Simmons	D'Angelo	January 31, 2015	4.3/10
780	14	Dakota Johnson	Alabama Shakes	February 28, 2015	3.8/9
781	15	Chris Hemsworth	Zac Brown Band	March 7, 2015	4.0/10
782	16	Dwayne Johnson	George Ezra	March 28, 2015	3.7/9
783	17	Michael Keaton	Carly Rae Jepsen	April 4, 2015	3.7/9
784	18	Taraji P. Henson	Mumford & Sons	April 11, 2015	3.8/10
785	19	Scarlett Johansson	Wiz Khalifa	May 2, 2015	3.4/9
786	20	Reese Witherspoon	Florence + the Machine	May 9, 2015	3.7/10
787	21	Louis C.K.	Rihanna	May 16, 2015	3.8/10

=== Season 41 (2015–16) ===
No. overall	No. in season	Host(s)	Musical guest(s)	Original release date	Ratings/ Share
788	1	Miley Cyrus	Miley Cyrus	October 3, 2015	4.5/11
789	2	Amy Schumer	The Weeknd	October 10, 2015	3.9/10
790	3	Tracy Morgan	Demi Lovato	October 17, 2015	4.2/11
791	4	Donald Trump	Sia	November 7, 2015	6.6/16
792	5	Elizabeth Banks	Disclosure	November 14, 2015	4.0/10
793	6	Matthew McConaughey	Adele	November 21, 2015	4.6/12
794	7	Ryan Gosling	Leon Bridges	December 5, 2015	4.1/10
795	8	Chris Hemsworth	Chance the Rapper	December 12, 2015	3.8/10
796	9	Tina Fey & Amy Poehler	Bruce Springsteen & the E Street Band	December 19, 2015	5.1/13
797	10	Adam Driver	Chris Stapleton	January 16, 2016	3.0/15 in 18-49 (approximately 5.7 overall)
798	11	Ronda Rousey	Selena Gomez	January 23, 2016	5.0/12
799	12	Larry David	The 1975	February 6, 2016	5.1/12
800	13	Melissa McCarthy	Kanye West	February 13, 2016	4.4/11
801	14	Jonah Hill	Future	March 5, 2016	4.0/10
802	15	Ariana Grande	Ariana Grande	March 12, 2016	4.0/10
803	16	Peter Dinklage	Gwen Stefani	April 2, 2016	4.0/10
804	17	Russell Crowe	Margo Price	April 9, 2016	4.0/10
805	18	Julia Louis-Dreyfus	Nick Jonas	April 16, 2016	3.9/10
806	19	Brie Larson	Alicia Keys	May 7, 2016	4.1/10
807	20	Drake	Drake	May 14, 2016	3.9/10
808	21	Fred Armisen	Courtney Barnett	May 21, 2016	3.7/10

=== Season 42 (2016–17) ===
No. overall	No. in season	Host	Musical guest	Original release date	Ratings/ Share
809	1	Margot Robbie	The Weeknd	October 1, 2016	5.8/15
810	2	Lin-Manuel Miranda	Twenty One Pilots	October 8, 2016	5.2/13
811	3	Emily Blunt	Bruno Mars	October 15, 2016	5.0/12
812	4	Tom Hanks	Lady Gaga	October 22, 2016	6.1/15
813	5	Benedict Cumberbatch	Solange	November 5, 2016	5.8/14
814	6	Dave Chappelle	A Tribe Called Quest	November 12, 2016	6.2/16
815	7	Kristen Wiig	The xx	November 19, 2016	4.7/12
816	8	Emma Stone	Shawn Mendes	December 3, 2016	4.4/11
817	9	John Cena	Maren Morris	December 10, 2016	4.8/12
818	10	Casey Affleck	Chance the Rapper	December 17, 2016	4.9/12
819	11	Felicity Jones	Sturgill Simpson	January 14, 2017	4.3/11
820	12	Aziz Ansari	Big Sean	January 21, 2017	5.1/13
821	13	Kristen Stewart	Alessia Cara	February 4, 2017	5.0/13
822	14	Alec Baldwin	Ed Sheeran	February 11, 2017	7.2/18
823	15	Octavia Spencer	Father John Misty	March 4, 2017	5.2/14
824	16	Scarlett Johansson	Lorde	March 11, 2017	4.8/13
825	17	Louis C.K.	The Chainsmokers	April 8, 2017	4.5/12
826	18	Jimmy Fallon	Harry Styles	April 15, 2017	7.88 M avg. US viewers
827	19	Chris Pine	LCD Soundsystem	May 6, 2017	6.919 M avg. US viewers
828	20	Melissa McCarthy	HAIM	May 13, 2017	10.337 M avg. US viewers
829	21	Dwayne Johnson	Katy Perry	May 20, 2017	8.272 M avg. US viewers

=== Season 43 (2017–18) ===
No. overall	No. in season	Host	Musical guest	Original release date	Ratings/ Share
830	1	Ryan Gosling	Jay-Z	September 30, 2017	4.5
831	2	Gal Gadot	Sam Smith	October 7, 2017	4.4
832	3	Kumail Nanjiani	P!nk	October 14, 2017	4.6/11
833	4	Larry David	Miley Cyrus	November 4, 2017	4.7/11
834	5	Tiffany Haddish	Taylor Swift	November 11, 2017	4.3/10
835	6	Chance the Rapper	Eminem	November 18, 2017	4.3/10
836	7	Saoirse Ronan	U2	December 2, 2017	4.3/10
837	8	James Franco	SZA	December 9, 2017	4.5/10
838	9	Kevin Hart	Foo Fighters	December 16, 2017	4.6/11
839	10	Sam Rockwell	Halsey	January 13, 2018	4.6/10
840	11	Jessica Chastain	Troye Sivan	January 20, 2018	4.3/10
841	12	Will Ferrell	Chris Stapleton	January 27, 2018	4.9/11
842	13	Natalie Portman	Dua Lipa	February 3, 2018	4.6/12
843	14	Charles Barkley	Migos	March 3, 2018	4.2/10
844	15	Sterling K. Brown	James Bay	March 10, 2018	4.1/10
845	16	Bill Hader	Arcade Fire	March 17, 2018	4.5/10
846	17	Chadwick Boseman	Cardi B	April 7, 2018	4.6/11
847	18	John Mulaney	Jack White	April 14, 2018	3.9/9
848	19	Donald Glover	Donald Glover (Note: For his musical performance, Glover was billed as his stage name Childish Gambino)	May 5, 2018	4.1/10
849	20	Amy Schumer	Kacey Musgraves	May 12, 2018	4.3/10
850	21	Tina Fey	Nicki Minaj	May 19, 2018	4.5/11

=== Season 44 (2018–19) ===
No. overall	No. in season	Host	Musical guest(s)	Original release date	Ratings/ Share
851	1	Adam Driver	Kanye West	September 29, 2018	4.8/11
852	2	Awkwafina	Travis Scott	October 6, 2018	4.2/10
853	3	Seth Meyers	Paul Simon	October 13, 2018	4.4/10
854	4	Jonah Hill	Maggie Rogers	November 3, 2018	4.4/10
855	5	Liev Schreiber	Lil Wayne	November 10, 2018	4.0/10
856	6	Steve Carell	Ella Mai	November 17, 2018	4.4/11
857	7	Claire Foy	Anderson .Paak	December 1, 2018	4.1/10
858	8	Jason Momoa	Mumford & Sons	December 8, 2018	4.3/10
859	9	Matt Damon	Mark Ronson & Miley Cyrus	December 15, 2018	4.8/12
860	10	Rachel Brosnahan	Greta Van Fleet	January 19, 2019	4.5/11
861	11	James McAvoy	Meek Mill	January 26, 2019	4.1/10
862	12	Halsey	Halsey	February 9, 2019	4.7/11
863	13	Don Cheadle	Gary Clark Jr.	February 16, 2019	4.3/11
864	14	John Mulaney	Thomas Rhett	March 2, 2019	4.7/11
865	15	Idris Elba	Khalid	March 9, 2019	4.5/11
866	16	Sandra Oh	Tame Impala	March 30, 2019	4.1/10
867	17	Kit Harington	Sara Bareilles	April 6, 2019	4.4/11
868	18	Emma Stone	BTS	April 13, 2019	3.9/10
869	19	Adam Sandler	Shawn Mendes	May 4, 2019	4.8/12
870	20	Emma Thompson	Jonas Brothers	May 11, 2019	4.2/10
871	21	Paul Rudd	DJ Khaled	May 18, 2019	4.0/10

=== Season 45 (2019–20) ===
No. overall	No. in season	Host	Musical guest	Original release date	Ratings/ Share
872	1	Woody Harrelson	Billie Eilish	September 28, 2019	4.1/10
873	2	Phoebe Waller-Bridge	Taylor Swift	October 5, 2019	4.0/11
874	3	David Harbour	Camila Cabello	October 12, 2019	3.8/11
875	4	Chance the Rapper	Chance the Rapper	October 26, 2019	3.8/11
876	5	Kristen Stewart	Coldplay	November 2, 2019	4.1/11
877	6	Harry Styles	Harry Styles	November 16, 2019	3.9/10
878	7	Will Ferrell	King Princess	November 23, 2019	4.3/14
879	8	Jennifer Lopez	DaBaby	December 7, 2019	4.2/11
880	9	Scarlett Johansson	Niall Horan	December 14, 2019	4.0/11
881	10	Eddie Murphy	Lizzo	December 21, 2019	6.7/16
882	11	Adam Driver	Halsey	January 25, 2020	3.8/11
883	12	J. J. Watt	Luke Combs	February 1, 2020	4.1/11
884	13	RuPaul	Justin Bieber	February 8, 2020	4.3/12
885	14	John Mulaney	David Byrne	February 29, 2020	4.0/12
886	15	Daniel Craig	The Weeknd	March 7, 2020	4.1/11

=== Saturday Night Live at Home ===
No. overall	No. in season	Host	Musical guest	Original release date	Ratings/ Share
887	16	Tom Hanks	Chris Martin	April 11, 2020	4.6
888	17	none credited (Note: While some sources listed Brad Pitt as the host for the episode, he was not formally credited as such.)	Miley Cyrus	April 25, 2020	4.0
889	18	Kristen Wiig	Boyz II Men featuring Babyface	May 9, 2020	3.7

=== Season 46 (2020–21) ===
No. overall	No. in season	Host	Musical guest	Original release date	Ratings/ Share
890	1	Chris Rock	Megan Thee Stallion	October 3, 2020	5.6
891	2	Bill Burr	Jack White (Note: Morgan Wallen's scheduled appearance as the musical guest was cancelled the week of the episode after videos surfaced showing him violating the show's COVID-19 protocols on mask wearing and social distancing. White was announced as a replacement the day before the broadcast. Wallen was later rescheduled for the December 5 episode.)	October 10, 2020 (Note: The episode was broadcast as planned in spite of an employee at 30 Rockefeller Plaza having tested positive for COVID-19 on air day.)	4.7
892	3	Issa Rae	Justin Bieber	October 17, 2020	4.5
893	4	Adele	H.E.R.	October 24, 2020	5.0
894	5	John Mulaney	The Strokes	October 31, 2020	4.7
895	6	Dave Chappelle (Note: Chappelle hosted the first episode immediately following the presidential election. He also hosted the first episode immediately following the 2016 presidential election.)	Foo Fighters	November 7, 2020 (Note: The episode was delayed due to a Clemson vs. Notre Dame college football game that went into double overtime.)	9.1 million
896	7	Jason Bateman	Morgan Wallen	December 5, 2020	6.1 million
897	8	Timothée Chalamet	Bruce Springsteen & the E Street Band	December 12, 2020	6.7 million
898	9	Kristen Wiig	Dua Lipa	December 19, 2020	6.3 million
899	10	John Krasinski	Machine Gun Kelly	January 30, 2021	4.4
900	11	Dan Levy	Phoebe Bridgers	February 6, 2021	4.2
901	12	Regina King	Nathaniel Rateliff	February 13, 2021	4.1
902	13	Regé-Jean Page	Bad Bunny	February 20, 2021	4.2
903	14	Nick Jonas	Nick Jonas	February 27, 2021	4.1
904	15	Maya Rudolph	Jack Harlow	March 27, 2021	3.6
905	16	Daniel Kaluuya	St. Vincent	April 3, 2021	3.6
906	17	Carey Mulligan	Kid Cudi	April 10, 2021	3.6
907	18	Elon Musk	Miley Cyrus	May 8, 2021	4.7
908	19	Keegan-Michael Key	Olivia Rodrigo	May 15, 2021	3.5
909	20	Anya Taylor-Joy	Lil Nas X	May 22, 2021	3.5

=== Season 47 (2021–22) ===
No. overall	No. in season	Host	Musical guest	Original release date	Live+Same Day Ratings/ Share
910	1	Owen Wilson	Kacey Musgraves	October 2, 2021	3.5
911	2	Kim Kardashian West	Halsey	October 9, 2021	3.8
912	3	Rami Malek	Young Thug	October 16, 2021	3.4
913	4	Jason Sudeikis	Brandi Carlile	October 23, 2021	3.7
914	5	Kieran Culkin	Ed Sheeran (Note: Sheeran performed despite having tested positive for COVID-19 thirteen days prior to show date. His performance was confirmed four days prior to show date after having been cleared of having the virus.)	November 6, 2021	4.89
915	6	Jonathan Majors	Taylor Swift	November 13, 2021	4.97
916	7	Simu Liu	Saweetie	November 20, 2021	4.70
917	8	Billie Eilish	Billie Eilish	December 11, 2021	5.16
918	9	Paul Rudd	none (Note: Charli XCX was the scheduled musical act, but the rise of the COVID Omicron variant in New York City led to a limited cast and crew which meant her performances were dropped. However, she appeared in a pre-recorded sketch. She was rescheduled as a musical guest and performed in March 2022.)	December 18, 2021	5.15
919	10	Ariana DeBose	Bleachers (Note: Bleachers substitutes for Roddy Ricch, whose scheduled musical performance was cancelled due to a COVID-19 exposure.)	January 15, 2022	5.05
920	11	Will Forte	Måneskin	January 22, 2022	4.80
921	12	Willem Dafoe	Katy Perry	January 29, 2022	4.97
922	13	John Mulaney	LCD Soundsystem	February 26, 2022	4.74
923	14	Oscar Isaac	Charli XCX	March 5, 2022	4.42
924	15	Zoë Kravitz	Rosalía	March 12, 2022	4.36
925	16	Jerrod Carmichael	Gunna	April 2, 2022	4.65
926	17	Jake Gyllenhaal	Camila Cabello	April 9, 2022	4.85
927	18	Lizzo	Lizzo	April 16, 2022	4.53
928	19	Benedict Cumberbatch	Arcade Fire	May 7, 2022	4.50
929	20	Selena Gomez	Post Malone	May 14, 2022	4.40
930	21	Natasha Lyonne	Japanese Breakfast	May 21, 2022	4.60

=== Season 48 (2022–23) ===
No. overall	No. in season	Host(s)	Musical guest	Original release date	U.S. viewers (millions)
931	1	Miles Teller	Kendrick Lamar	October 1, 2022	4.02
932	2	Brendan Gleeson	Willow	October 8, 2022	3.76
933	3	Megan Thee Stallion	Megan Thee Stallion	October 15, 2022	3.72
934	4	Jack Harlow	Jack Harlow	October 29, 2022	4.12
935	5	Amy Schumer	Steve Lacy	November 5, 2022	4.32
936	6	Dave Chappelle	Black Star	November 12, 2022	4.75
937	7	Keke Palmer	SZA	December 3, 2022	3.99
938	8	Steve Martin & Martin Short	Brandi Carlile	December 10, 2022 (Note: During the episode's original airing, the audio in some markets was out of sync during the cold open and part of the opening monologue. This issue was fixed partway through the monologue, and the rerun later that night had the audio synced with the video.)	5.06
939	9	Austin Butler	Lizzo (Note: Yeah Yeah Yeahs were originally booked as this episode's musical guest, but had to cancel the week prior due to guitarist Nick Zinner's hospitalization for pneumonia.)	December 17, 2022	4.36
940	10	Aubrey Plaza	Sam Smith	January 21, 2023	4.81
941	11	Michael B. Jordan	Lil Baby	January 28, 2023	4.17
942	12	Pedro Pascal	Coldplay	February 4, 2023	4.30
943	13	Woody Harrelson	Jack White	February 25, 2023	4.16
944	14	Travis Kelce	Kelsea Ballerini	March 4, 2023	4.52
945	15	Jenna Ortega	The 1975	March 11, 2023	4.24
946	16	Quinta Brunson	Lil Yachty	April 1, 2023	4.21
947	17	Molly Shannon	Jonas Brothers	April 8, 2023	4.14
948	18	Ana de Armas	Karol G	April 15, 2023	3.80

=== Season 49 (2023–24) ===
No. overall	No. in season	Host	Musical guest	Original release date	U.S. viewers (millions)
949	1	Pete Davidson	Ice Spice	October 14, 2023	4.80
950	2	Bad Bunny	Bad Bunny	October 21, 2023	4.04
951	3	Nate Bargatze	Foo Fighters	October 28, 2023	4.85
952	4	Timothée Chalamet	Boygenius	November 11, 2023	3.68
953	5	Jason Momoa	Tate McRae	November 18, 2023	N/A (<4.67)
954	6	Emma Stone	Noah Kahan	December 2, 2023	3.89
955	7	Adam Driver	Olivia Rodrigo	December 9, 2023	4.22
956	8	Kate McKinnon	Billie Eilish	December 16, 2023	N/A (<4.67)
957	9	Jacob Elordi	Reneé Rapp	January 20, 2024	4.34
958	10	Dakota Johnson	Justin Timberlake	January 27, 2024	4.50
959	11	Ayo Edebiri	Jennifer Lopez	February 3, 2024	4.57
960	12	Shane Gillis	21 Savage	February 24, 2024	3.99
961	13	Sydney Sweeney	Kacey Musgraves	March 2, 2024	4.03
962	14	Josh Brolin	Ariana Grande	March 9, 2024	4.67
963	15	Ramy Youssef	Travis Scott	March 30, 2024	3.89
964	16	Kristen Wiig	Raye	April 6, 2024	4.58
965	17	Ryan Gosling	Chris Stapleton	April 13, 2024	4.70
966	18	Dua Lipa	Dua Lipa	May 4, 2024	4.74
967	19	Maya Rudolph	Vampire Weekend	May 11, 2024	4.25
968	20	Jake Gyllenhaal	Sabrina Carpenter	May 18, 2024	4.21

=== Season 50 (2024–25) ===
No. overall	No. in season	Host	Musical guest(s)	Original release date	U.S. viewers (millions)
969	1	Jean Smart	Jelly Roll	September 28, 2024	5.39
970	2	Nate Bargatze	Coldplay	October 5, 2024	4.76
971	3	Ariana Grande	Stevie Nicks	October 12, 2024	5.57
972	4	Michael Keaton	Billie Eilish	October 19, 2024	4.77
973	5	John Mulaney	Chappell Roan	November 2, 2024	6.59
974	6	Bill Burr	Mk.gee	November 9, 2024	4.42
975	7	Charli XCX	Charli XCX	November 16, 2024	4.29
976	8	Paul Mescal	Shaboozey	December 7, 2024	3.84
977	9	Chris Rock	Gracie Abrams	December 14, 2024	4.22
978	10	Martin Short	Hozier	December 21, 2024	4.79
979	11	Dave Chappelle	GloRilla	January 18, 2025	4.85
980	12	Timothée Chalamet	Timothée Chalamet	January 25, 2025	4.96
981	13	Shane Gillis	Tate McRae	March 1, 2025	4.28
982	14	Lady Gaga	Lady Gaga	March 8, 2025	4.63
983	15	Mikey Madison	Morgan Wallen	March 29, 2025	4.27
984	16	Jack Black	Elton John & Brandi Carlile	April 5, 2025	4.53
985	17	Jon Hamm	Lizzo	April 12, 2025	4.29
986	18	Quinta Brunson	Benson Boone	May 3, 2025	4.37
987	19	Walton Goggins	Arcade Fire	May 10, 2025	4.22
988	20	Scarlett Johansson	Bad Bunny	May 17, 2025	4.87

=== Season 51 (2025–26) ===
No. overall	No. in season	Host	Musical guest	Original release date	U.S. viewers (millions)
989	1	Bad Bunny	Doja Cat	October 4, 2025	4.41
990	2	Amy Poehler	Role Model	October 11, 2025	4.07
991	3	Sabrina Carpenter	Sabrina Carpenter	October 18, 2025	4.24
992	4	Miles Teller	Brandi Carlile	November 1, 2025	3.36
993	5	Nikki Glaser	Sombr	November 8, 2025	4.02
994	6	Glen Powell	Olivia Dean	November 15, 2025	4.17
995	7	Melissa McCarthy	Dijon	December 6, 2025	4.30
996	8	Josh O'Connor	Lily Allen	December 13, 2025	3.95
997	9	Ariana Grande	Cher	December 20, 2025	5.40
998	10	Finn Wolfhard	A$AP Rocky	January 17, 2026	4.14
999	11	Teyana Taylor	Geese	January 24, 2026	4.44
1000	12	Alexander Skarsgård	Cardi B	January 31, 2026	4.82
1001	13	Connor Storrie	Mumford & Sons	February 28, 2026	4.61
1002	14	Ryan Gosling	Gorillaz	March 7, 2026	4.34
1003	15	Harry Styles	Harry Styles	March 14, 2026	4.79
1004	16	Jack Black	Jack White	April 4, 2026	4.50
1005	17	Colman Domingo	Anitta	April 11, 2026	4.15
1006	18	Olivia Rodrigo	Olivia Rodrigo	May 2, 2026	4.99
1007	19	Matt Damon	Noah Kahan	May 9, 2026	4.68
1008	20	Will Ferrell	Paul McCartney	May 16, 2026	5.30

=== Season 52 (2026) ===
No. overall	No. in season	Host	Musical guest	Original release date	U.S. viewers (millions)
1009	1	Jalen Brunson	Katseye	September 26, 2026	4.61
1010	2	Dakota Johnson	Turnstile	October 3, 2026	4.40
1011	3	Shane Gillis	Rosalía	October 10, 2026	4.42
1012	4	Inde Navarrette	Gracie Abrams	October 31, 2026	TBD
1013	5	Druski	The Strokes	November 7, 2026	TBD
1014	6	John Mulaney	Phoebe Bridgers	November 14, 2026	TBD
1015	7	TBA	TBA	December 5, 2026	TBD
1016	8	TBA	TBA	December 12, 2026	TBD
1017	9	TBA	TBA	December 19, 2026	TBD

=== Specials ===
Title	Original release date	Ratings/ Share
"Mardi Gras Special"	February 20, 1977	N/A
One of the few episodes to air from a location outside of NBC's studios at 30 Rockefeller Plaza in New York, the Mardi Gras Special was broadcast live from New Orleans on Mardi Gras 1977. It was hosted by Randy Newman, who also performed songs, and featured a number of special guests, including Buck Henry, Eric Idle, Cindy Williams, and Henry Winkler.
"SNL Film Festival"	March 2, 1985	N/A
A clip show hosted by Billy Crystal which featured SNL's best pretaped sketches and short films from 1981 to 1985, including short films by Albert Brooks, Gary Weis, Tom Schiller, and Christopher Guest.
"Saturday Night Live 15th Anniversary Special"	September 24, 1989	N/A
An anniversary show celebrating SNL's 15th season. Chevy Chase returned to reprise his "opening fall" bit in the cold open and Tom Hanks performed the opening monologue. Prince and Paul Simon performed. The show featured a number of special guests, including SNL stars Kevin Nealon, Phil Hartman, Dan Aykroyd, Jon Lovitz, Jane Curtin, Christopher Guest, Martin Short, and Buck Henry, as well as others including Robin Williams, Billy Crystal, Mary Tyler Moore, O. J. Simpson, and Bruce Willis.
"2nd Annual Saturday Night Live Mother's Day Special"	May 9, 1993	N/A
A Mother's Day special featuring the SNL ensemble with their real-life mothers as well as a compilation of sketches from the 1992–93 season.
"Saturday Night Live 25th Anniversary Special"	September 26, 1999	N/A
A look back at the first 25 years.
"Live from New York: The First 5 Years of Saturday Night Live"	February 20, 2005	N/A
A documentary that takes a look back at SNL's rise to popularity from 1975 to 1979.
"SNL Goes Commercial"	November 5, 2005	N/A
A look back at the funniest and most memorable commercial parodies from the past years of SNL, originally broadcast in the early '90s, hosted by Kevin Nealon and Victoria Jackson; later revisited in 2005, hosted by Will Ferrell, featuring a wrap-around of Ferrell heading to a commercial audition; re-edited and shown with newer commercial parodies on March 8, 2009, under the title SNL: Just Commercials.
"Lost & Found: SNL in the '80s"	November 20, 2005	N/A
A look back at SNL's rocky history in the 1980s: Jean Doumanian's notorious tenure as producer for the 1980–1981 season, the temporary cancelling, retooling, and reviving of SNL with the help of Dick Ebersol, Eddie Murphy, and Joe Piscopo, the return of Lorne Michaels in 1985 (and the second time NBC would threaten the show with cancellation), and the second golden age of SNL with the hiring of Dana Carvey, Phil Hartman, Jan Hooks, Kevin Nealon, Victoria Jackson, and (later) Mike Myers.
"Saturday Night Live: The Best of Saturday TV Funhouse"	April 29, 2006	N/A
The Ambiguously Gay Duo host a retrospective of Robert Smigel's most memorable animated segments known as TV Funhouse while going behind the scenes of Saturday Night Live and tricking Andy Samberg and Jason Sudeikis into riding in the duo's penis-shaped car; special appearance by former cast member Jimmy Fallon.
"Saturday Night Live: Best of 06–07"	May 5, 2007	N/A
Retrospective of the 32nd season's most memorable sketches, Digital Shorts, and Weekend Update jokes from episodes hosted by Alec Baldwin, Rainn Wilson, Peyton Manning, Julia Louis-Dreyfus, Dane Cook, Jake Gyllenhaal, Hugh Laurie, Jaime Pressly, Matthew Fox, and Justin Timberlake.
"Saturday Night Live in the '90s: Pop Culture Nation"	May 6, 2007	N/A
A look at SNL's rise, fall, and rebirth in the 1990s, featuring the hiring of Chris Farley, Adam Sandler, and David Spade as cast members (and critics attacking the show for resorting to lowbrow humor as a result of hiring Sandler, Farley, and Spade), Sinéad O'Connor's infamous performance in the 1992 episode hosted by Tim Robbins, season 20 as yet another critical and ratings low point for the show, and the third golden age of SNL with the hiring of Will Ferrell, Darrell Hammond, Ana Gasteyer, Cheri Oteri, Molly Shannon, Jimmy Fallon, and Horatio Sanz.
"Saturday Night Live Presidential Bash 2008"	November 3, 2008	N/A
A look at SNL's past and present political sketches; special guests John McCain and Sarah Palin.
"Saturday Night Live Sports Extra 2009"	January 4, 2009	N/A
A clip show episode highlighting SNL's many sports-themed sketches and the many sports stars who have appeared on the show, such as Derek Jeter, Peyton Manning, Michael Phelps, Nancy Kerrigan, Walter Payton, Joe Montana, Michael Jordan, and Charles Barkley.
"Saturday Night Live Just Game Show Parodies"	March 8, 2009	N/A
A look at SNL's past and present game show parodies.
"Saturday Night Live: Just Shorts"	May 17, 2009	N/A
A compilation of SNL's Digital Shorts and various pre-taped segments and short films over the years, hosted by Andy Samberg.
"Saturday Night Live Presents: A Very Gilly Christmas"	December 17, 2009	N/A
A compilation of SNL's December holiday-themed sketches, with some new sketches, hosted by Kristen Wiig as her character Gilly; the latest incarnation of SNL Christmas specials, dating back to the early '90s under the title Saturday Night Live Christmas Past.
"Saturday Night Live Sports All-Stars"	January 31, 2010	N/A
A compilation of SNL sport-themed sketches. Several similar specials, under the name Saturday Night Live Sports Extra, aired sporadically from the early '90s to 2009, traditionally around the time of that year's Super Bowl.
"Saturday Night Live in the 2000s: Time and Again"	April 15, 2010	N/A
Documentary looking back on Saturday Night Live's transformation and memorable moments from 2000 to 2009.
"The Women of Saturday Night Live"	November 1, 2010	2.0/5
Tina Fey, Rachel Dratch, Amy Poehler, Maya Rudolph, Julia Louis-Dreyfus, Kristen Wiig, Nora Dunn, Laraine Newman, Molly Shannon, Ana Gasteyer, and Cheri Oteri come together to present new material and relive the best moments of SNL featuring the female cast members.
"Saturday Night Live Backstage"	February 20, 2011	3.8/6
Originally a special celebrating the 35th anniversary of the show was planned but it was scrapped and replaced with this special, which shows viewers how an SNL episode is created within the span of a week.
"Saturday Night Live Christmas"	November 28, 2012	7.36
A collection of memorable holiday-themed sketches from past and present eras.
"Saturday Night Live Halloween"	October 31, 2013	5.32
A collection of Halloween-based sketches and scary movie parodies.
"Saturday Night Live Thanksgiving"	November 27, 2013	4.87
A compilation of SNL Thanksgiving-themed sketches.
"Saturday Night Live Christmas"	December 4, 2013	7.42
A collection of Christmas and December holiday-based sketches.
"Saturday Night Live: The Best of This Season"	January 4, 2014	5.6/14
A compilation of the best sketches of seasons 38 and 39.
"Saturday Night Live Presents: An SNL Sports Spectacular"	January 30, 2014	4.79
A collection of sketches from episodes hosted by professional athletes and other sports stars, hosted by Seth Meyers.
"SNL Shorts"	April 24, 2014	N/A
A compilation of SNL Digital Shorts.
"Saturday Night Live Thanksgiving"	November 26, 2014	N/A
A compilation of SNL Thanksgiving-themed sketches.
"SNL's NFL Saturday"	January 31, 2015	3.80
Past sketches involving the NFL are shown.
"An SNL Valentine"	February 14, 2015	N/A
A special dedicated to Valentine's Day.
"SNL 40th Red Carpet Live"	February 15, 2015	N/A
A special hosted by Matt Lauer, Savannah Guthrie, Carson Daly, and Al Roker. They interviewed past hosts, current and previous cast members, and musical legends who had previously performed on the show.
"Saturday Night Live 40th Anniversary Special"	February 15, 2015	23.1
A 3 1/2 hour prime-time special celebrating SNL's fortieth year on the air.
"SNL Goodnight Sweet Prince"	April 23, 2016	4.5/11
Jimmy Fallon hosts this special retrospective of Prince's rare, but memorable performances on the show, including his first performance on the infamous season 6 episode hosted by Charlene Tilton (the one in which Charles Rocket's accidental utterance of the word "fuck" called for NBC to fire then-showrunner Jean Doumanian and most of her cast), his performance on the SNL 15th anniversary special, his first performance after 21 years in 2006 on the season 31 episode hosted by Steve Martin, his final performance on the season 40 episode hosted by Chris Rock, a never-before-seen clip of his performance at the cast party following the SNL 40th anniversary special, and clips of the short-lived recurring sketch The Prince Show with Fred Armisen as Prince and Maya Rudolph as Beyoncé.
"Weekend Update at the RNC"	July 20, 2016	N/A
Colin Jost and Michael Che host a special edition of Weekend Update from the 2016 Republican National Convention live on MSNBC. Kate McKinnon appears as Ruth Bader Ginsburg.
"Weekend Update at the DNC"	July 27, 2016	N/A
Colin Jost and Michael Che host a special edition of Weekend Update from the 2016 Democratic National Convention live on MSNBC.
"The 2016 SNL Election Special"	November 7, 2016	2.1/7
Recent political sketches involving the 2016 US presidential election, hosted by Tom Brokaw.
"SNL Thanksgiving Special"	November 23, 2016	1.6/5
Thanksgiving-themed comedy from the Saturday Night Live crew is presented.
"SNL Christmas"	December 14, 2016	1.6/5
Holiday-themed comedy from Saturday Night Live is presented.
"The David S. Pumpkins Halloween Special"	October 28, 2017	3.4/8
21-minute animated special where David S. Pumpkins teaches a pair of siblings the true meaning of Halloween, starring Tom Hanks as David S. Pumpkins, Mikey Day, Bobby Moynihan, and Streeter Seidell; narrated by Peter Dinklage.
"SNL Presents: Halloween"	October 28, 2017	3.1/9
A collection of Halloween- and horror-themed sketches.
"A Saturday Night Live Mother's Day"	May 10, 2020	N/A
A special showing of all Mother's Day-themed sketches from previous seasons, including a mother's day Lawrence Welk Show sketch from season 35 with host Betty White.
"The 2020 SNL Election Special"	November 2, 2020	N/A
A special showing of all fan-favorite SNL political sketches.
"A Saturday Night Live Christmas Special"	December 14, 2022	N/A
A star-studded collection of popular Christmas-themed sketches from "Saturday Night Live." Billed as Season 48 Episode 200.
"A Saturday Night Live Christmas"	December 18, 2024	N/A
The late-night program highlights Christmas-themed sketches from its 50 seasons. Billed as Season 50 Episode 300.
"Saturday Night Live 50th Anniversary Special"	February 16, 2025	N/A
