= List of Saturday Night Live episodes (seasons 1–30) =

Airings of the NBC variety show from 1975 to 2005

Current logo of Saturday Night Live since season 50

Saturday Night Live (SNL) is an American late-night sketch comedy and variety show created by Lorne Michaels. It premiered on NBC on October 11, 1975, under the title NBC's Saturday Night. The show often satirizes contemporary American popular culture and politics. Saturday Night Live features a two-tiered cast: the repertory members, also known as the "Not Ready for Prime Time Players", and newer cast members, known as "Featured Players". Each week, the show features a host, often a well-known celebrity, who delivers an opening monologue and performs in sketches with the cast. A musical guest is also invited to perform several sets (usually two, occasionally more). Every so often a host or musical guest fills both roles. With the exception of season 7 and several other rare cases, the show begins with a cold open that ends with someone breaking character and proclaiming "Live from New York, it's Saturday Night!"

Saturday Night Live is one of the longest-running network programs in American television history, with more than 900 episodes broadcast over five decades. A number of the show's sketches have been developed into feature films, including The Blues Brothers, Wayne's World, A Night at the Roxbury, Superstar, Coneheads, It's Pat, The Ladies Man and MacGruber.

Seasons 1 through 5 are available on DVD in Region 1. Various Saturday Night Live sketches are available in several new media formats, including streaming on Hulu and Netflix. YouTube SNL playlists of individual sketches and segments are available for many SNL episodes, via the show's official YouTube channel. Best-of compilations are for sale through digital video retailers. As of October 1, 2020, the full catalogue of Saturday Night Live episodes is available on the streaming service Peacock, updated actively as new episodes release.

Season	Episodes	Originally released	
Season	Episodes	First released	Last released
1	24	October 11, 1975	July 31, 1976
2	22	September 18, 1976	May 21, 1977
3	20	September 24, 1977	May 20, 1978
4	20	October 7, 1978	May 26, 1979
5	20	October 13, 1979	May 24, 1980
6	13 (Note: Number of episodes reduced due to executive producer Lorne Michaels taking a year off and the 1981 Writers Guild of America strike)	November 15, 1980	April 11, 1981
7	20	October 3, 1981	May 22, 1982
8	20	September 25, 1982	May 14, 1983
9	19	October 8, 1983	May 12, 1984
10	17 (Note: Only 17 episodes were produced due to a writers' strike and budget constraint)	October 6, 1984	April 13, 1985
11	18	November 9, 1985	May 24, 1986
12	20	October 11, 1986	May 23, 1987
13	13 (Note: Number of episodes reduced due to the 1988 Writers Guild of America strike)	October 17, 1987	February 27, 1988
14	20	October 8, 1988	May 20, 1989
15	20	September 30, 1989	May 19, 1990
16	20	September 29, 1990	May 18, 1991
17	20	September 28, 1991	May 16, 1992
18	20	September 26, 1992	May 15, 1993
19	20	September 25, 1993	May 14, 1994
20	20	September 24, 1994	May 13, 1995
21	20	September 30, 1995	May 18, 1996
22	20	September 28, 1996	May 17, 1997
23	20	September 27, 1997	May 9, 1998
24	19	September 26, 1998	May 15, 1999
25	20	October 2, 1999	May 20, 2000
26	20	October 7, 2000	May 19, 2001
27	20	September 29, 2001	May 18, 2002
28	20	October 5, 2002	May 17, 2003
29	20	October 4, 2003	May 15, 2004
30	20	October 2, 2004	May 21, 2005
31	19	October 1, 2005	May 20, 2006
32	20	September 30, 2006	May 19, 2007
33	12 (Note: Number of episodes reduced due to the 2007–08 Writers Guild of America strike)	September 29, 2007	May 17, 2008
34	22	September 13, 2008	May 16, 2009
35	22	September 26, 2009	May 15, 2010
36	22	September 25, 2010	May 21, 2011
37	22	September 24, 2011	May 19, 2012
38	21	September 15, 2012	May 18, 2013
39	21	September 28, 2013	May 17, 2014
40	21	September 27, 2014	May 16, 2015
41	21	October 3, 2015	May 21, 2016
42	21	October 1, 2016	May 20, 2017
43	21	September 30, 2017	May 19, 2018
44	21	September 29, 2018	May 18, 2019
45	18 (Note: Number of episodes reduced due to the breakout of the COVID-19 pandemic)	September 28, 2019	May 9, 2020
46	20	October 3, 2020	May 22, 2021
47	21	October 2, 2021	May 21, 2022
48	18 (Note: Number of episodes reduced due to the 2023 Writers Guild of America strike)	October 1, 2022	April 15, 2023
49	20	October 14, 2023	May 18, 2024
50	20	September 28, 2024	May 17, 2025
51	20	October 4, 2025	May 16, 2026
52	TBA	October 3, 2026	2027

== Episodes ==
=== Season 1 (1975–76) ===
No. overall	No. in season	Host	Musical guest(s)	Original release date
1	1	George Carlin	Janis Ian & Billy Preston	October 11, 1975
2	2	Paul Simon	Randy Newman, Phoebe Snow, Art Garfunkel & Jessy Dixon Singers	October 18, 1975
3	3	Rob Reiner	none	October 25, 1975
4	4	Candice Bergen	Esther Phillips	November 8, 1975
5	5	Robert Klein	ABBA & Loudon Wainwright III	November 15, 1975
6	6	Lily Tomlin	Tomlin with Howard Shore & the All Nurse Band	November 22, 1975
7	7	Richard Pryor	Gil Scott-Heron	December 13, 1975
8	8	Candice Bergen	Martha Reeves & The Stylistics	December 20, 1975
9	9	Elliott Gould	Anne Murray	January 10, 1976
10	10	Buck Henry	Bill Withers & Toni Basil	January 17, 1976
11	11	Peter Cook & Dudley Moore	Neil Sedaka	January 24, 1976
12	12	Dick Cavett	Jimmy Cliff	January 31, 1976
13	13	Peter Boyle	Al Jarreau	February 14, 1976
14	14	Desi Arnaz	Desi Arnaz & Desi Arnaz Jr.	February 21, 1976
15	15	Jill Clayburgh	Leon Redbone & The Idlers	February 28, 1976
16	16	Anthony Perkins	Betty Carter	March 13, 1976
17	17	Ron Nessen	Patti Smith	April 17, 1976
18	18	Raquel Welch	Phoebe Snow & John Sebastian	April 24, 1976
19	19	Madeline Kahn	Carly Simon	May 8, 1976
20	20	Dyan Cannon	Leon and Mary Russell	May 15, 1976
21	21	Buck Henry	Gordon Lightfoot & Garrett Morris	May 22, 1976
22	22	Elliott Gould	Leon Redbone, Harlan Collins & Joyce Everson	May 29, 1976
23	23	Louise Lasser	Preservation Hall Jazz Band	July 24, 1976
24	24	Kris Kristofferson	Rita Coolidge	July 31, 1976

=== Season 2 (1976–77) ===
No. overall	No. in season	Host	Musical guest(s)	Original release date
25	1	Lily Tomlin	James Taylor	September 18, 1976
26	2	Norman Lear	Boz Scaggs	September 25, 1976
27	3	Eric Idle	Joe Cocker & Stuff	October 2, 1976
28	4	Karen Black	John Prine	October 16, 1976
29	5	Steve Martin	Kinky Friedman	October 23, 1976
30	6	Buck Henry	The Band	October 30, 1976
31	7	Dick Cavett	Ry Cooder	November 13, 1976
32	8	Paul Simon	Paul Simon & George Harrison	November 20, 1976
33	9	Jodie Foster	Brian Wilson	November 27, 1976
34	10	Candice Bergen	Frank Zappa with Don Pardo as "The Slime"	December 11, 1976
35	11	Ralph Nader	George Benson	January 15, 1977
36	12	Ruth Gordon	Chuck Berry	January 22, 1977
37	13	Fran Tarkenton	Leo Sayer; Donnie Harper	January 29, 1977
38	14	Steve Martin	The Kinks	February 26, 1977
39	15	Sissy Spacek	Richard Baskin	March 12, 1977
40	16	Broderick Crawford	Levon Helm; Dr. John; The Meters	March 19, 1977
41	17	Jack Burns	Santana	March 26, 1977
42	18	Julian Bond	Tom Waits; Brick	April 9, 1977
43	19	Elliott Gould	McGarrigle Sisters; Roslyn Kind	April 16, 1977
44	20	Eric Idle	Alan Price; Neil Innes	April 23, 1977
45	21	Shelley Duvall	Joan Armatrading	May 14, 1977
46	22	Buck Henry	Jennifer Warnes; Kenny Vance	May 21, 1977

=== Season 3 (1977–78) ===
No. overall	No. in season	Host	Musical guest(s)	Original release date
47	1	Steve Martin	Jackson Browne	September 24, 1977
48	2	Madeline Kahn	Taj Mahal	October 8, 1977
49	3	Hugh Hefner	Libby Titus	October 15, 1977
50	4	Charles Grodin	Paul Simon	October 29, 1977
51	5	Ray Charles	Ray Charles	November 12, 1977
52	6	Buck Henry	Leon Redbone	November 19, 1977
53	7	Mary Kay Place	Willie Nelson	December 10, 1977
54	8	Miskel Spillman	Elvis Costello	December 17, 1977
55	9	Steve Martin	Randy Newman, The Nitty Gritty Dirt Band	January 21, 1978
56	10	Robert Klein	Bonnie Raitt	January 28, 1978
57	11	Chevy Chase	Billy Joel	February 18, 1978
58	12	O. J. Simpson	Ashford and Simpson	February 25, 1978
59	13	Art Garfunkel	Stephen Bishop	March 11, 1978
60	14	Jill Clayburgh	Eddie Money	March 18, 1978
61	15	Christopher Lee	Meat Loaf	March 25, 1978
62	16	Michael Palin	Eugene Record	April 8, 1978
63	17	Michael Sarrazin	Keith Jarrett	April 15, 1978
64	18	Steve Martin	The Blues Brothers	April 22, 1978
65	19	Richard Dreyfuss	Jimmy Buffett, Gary Tigerman	May 13, 1978
66	20	Buck Henry	Sun Ra	May 20, 1978

=== Season 4 (1978–79) ===
No. overall	No. in season	Host	Musical guest(s)	Original release date
67	1	The Rolling Stones	The Rolling Stones	October 7, 1978
68	2	Fred Willard	Devo	October 14, 1978
69	3	Frank Zappa	Frank Zappa	October 21, 1978
70	4	Steve Martin	Van Morrison	November 4, 1978
71	5	Buck Henry	Grateful Dead	November 11, 1978
72	6	Carrie Fisher	The Blues Brothers	November 18, 1978
73	7	Walter Matthau	Garrett Morris	December 2, 1978
74	8	Eric Idle	Kate Bush	December 9, 1978
75	9	Elliott Gould	Peter Tosh; Mick Jagger	December 16, 1978
76	10	Michael Palin	The Doobie Brothers	January 27, 1979
77	11	Cicely Tyson	Talking Heads	February 10, 1979
78	12	Ricky Nelson	Judy Collins	February 17, 1979
79	13	Kate Jackson	Delbert McClinton	February 24, 1979
80	14	Gary Busey	Eubie Blake & Gregory Hines; Gary Busey with Rick Danko & Paul Butterfield	March 10, 1979
81	15	Margot Kidder	The Chieftains	March 17, 1979
82	16	Richard Benjamin	Rickie Lee Jones	April 7, 1979
83	17	Milton Berle	Ornette Coleman	April 14, 1979
84	18	Michael Palin	James Taylor	May 12, 1979
85	19	Maureen Stapleton	Linda Ronstadt & Phoebe Snow	May 19, 1979
86	20	Buck Henry	Bette Midler	May 26, 1979

=== Season 5 (1979–80) ===
No. overall	No. in season	Host(s)	Musical guest(s)	Original release date
87	1	Steve Martin	Blondie	October 13, 1979
88	2	Eric Idle	Bob Dylan	October 20, 1979
89	3	Bill Russell	Chicago	November 3, 1979
90	4	Buck Henry	Tom Petty and the Heartbreakers	November 10, 1979
91	5	Bea Arthur	The Roches	November 17, 1979
92	6	Howard Hesseman	Randy Newman	December 8, 1979
93	7	Martin Sheen	David Bowie	December 15, 1979
94	8	Ted Knight	Desmond Child & Rouge	December 22, 1979
95	9	Teri Garr	The B-52's	January 26, 1980
96	10	Chevy Chase	Marianne Faithfull; Tom Scott	February 9, 1980
97	11	Elliott Gould	Gary Numan	February 16, 1980
98	12	Kirk Douglas	Sam & Dave	February 23, 1980
99	13	Rodney Dangerfield	The J. Geils Band	March 8, 1980
100	14	(none)	Paul Simon; James Taylor; David Sanborn	March 15, 1980
101	15	Richard Benjamin; Paula Prentiss	Grateful Dead	April 5, 1980
102	16	Burt Reynolds	Anne Murray	April 12, 1980
103	17	Strother Martin	The Specials	April 19, 1980
104	18	Bob Newhart	The Amazing Rhythm Aces; Bruce Cockburn	May 10, 1980
105	19	Steve Martin	3-D; Paul McCartney and Linda McCartney	May 17, 1980
106	20	Buck Henry	Andrew Gold; Andrae Crouch & the Voices of Unity	May 24, 1980

=== Season 6 (1980–81) ===
No. overall	No. in season	Host	Musical guest(s)	Original release date
107	1	Elliott Gould	Kid Creole & the Coconuts	November 15, 1980
108	2	Malcolm McDowell	Captain Beefheart & His Magic Band	November 22, 1980
109	3	Ellen Burstyn	Aretha Franklin; Keith Sykes	December 6, 1980
110	4	Jamie Lee Curtis	James Brown; Ellen Shipley	December 13, 1980
111	5	David Carradine	Linda Ronstadt; The Cast of The Pirates of Penzance	December 20, 1980
112	6	Ray Sharkey	Jack Bruce & Friends	January 10, 1981
113	7	Karen Black	Cheap Trick; Stanley Clarke Trio	January 17, 1981
114	8	Robert Hays	Joe "King" Carrasco & the Crowns; 14 Karat Soul	January 24, 1981
115	9	Sally Kellerman	Jimmy Cliff	February 7, 1981
116	10	Deborah Harry	Deborah Harry; Funky Four Plus One	February 14, 1981
117	11	Charlene Tilton	Todd Rundgren; Prince	February 21, 1981
118	12	Bill Murray	Delbert McClinton	March 7, 1981
119	13	(none)	Jr. Walker & the All-Stars	April 11, 1981

=== Season 7 (1981–82) ===
No. overall	No. in season	Host(s)	Musical guest(s)	Original release date
120	1	(none)	Rod Stewart	October 3, 1981
121	2	Susan Saint James	The Kinks	October 10, 1981
122	3	George Kennedy	Miles Davis	October 17, 1981
123	4	Donald Pleasence	Fear	October 31, 1981
124	5	Lauren Hutton	Rick James	November 7, 1981
125	6	Bernadette Peters	The Go-Go's; Billy Joel	November 14, 1981
126	7	Tim Curry	Meat Loaf	December 5, 1981
127	8	Bill Murray	The Spinners; The Whiffenpoofs	December 12, 1981
128	9	Robert Conrad	The Allman Brothers Band	January 23, 1982
129	10	John Madden	Jennifer Holliday	January 30, 1982
130	11	James Coburn	Lindsey Buckingham	February 6, 1982
131	12	Bruce Dern	Luther Vandross	February 20, 1982
132	13	Elizabeth Ashley	Hall & Oates	February 27, 1982
133	14	Robert Urich	Mink DeVille	March 20, 1982
134	15	Blythe Danner	Rickie Lee Jones	March 27, 1982
135	16	Daniel J. Travanti	John Cougar Mellencamp	April 10, 1982
136	17	Johnny Cash	Elton John	April 17, 1982
137	18	Robert Culp	The Charlie Daniels Band	April 24, 1982
138	19	Danny DeVito	Sparks	May 15, 1982
139	20	Olivia Newton-John	Olivia Newton-John	May 22, 1982

=== Season 8 (1982–83) ===
No. overall	No. in season	Host(s)	Musical guest(s)	Original release date
140	1	Chevy Chase	Queen	September 25, 1982
141	2	Louis Gossett Jr.	George Thorogood & the Destroyers	October 2, 1982
142	3	Ron Howard	The Clash	October 9, 1982
143	4	Howard Hesseman	Men at Work	October 23, 1982
144	5	Michael Keaton	The New Joe Jackson Band	October 30, 1982
145	6	Robert Blake	Kenny Loggins	November 13, 1982
146	7	Drew Barrymore	Squeeze	November 20, 1982
147	8	The Smothers Brothers	Laura Branigan	December 4, 1982
148	9	Eddie Murphy	Lionel Richie	December 11, 1982
149	10	Lily Tomlin	Tomlin as Purvis Hawkins	January 22, 1983
150	11	Rick Moranis; Dave Thomas	The BusBoys	January 29, 1983
151	12	Sid Caesar	Joe Cocker; Jennifer Warnes	February 5, 1983
152	13	Howard Hesseman	Tom Petty & The Heartbreakers	February 19, 1983
153	14	Beau Bridges; Jeff Bridges	Randy Newman	February 26, 1983
154	15	Bruce Dern	Leon Redbone	March 12, 1983
155	16	Robert Guillaume	Duran Duran	March 19, 1983
156	17	Joan Rivers	Musical Youth	April 9, 1983
157	18	Susan Saint James	Michael McDonald	April 16, 1983
158	19	Stevie Wonder	Stevie Wonder	May 7, 1983
159	20	Ed Koch	Kevin Rowland & Dexys Midnight Runners	May 14, 1983

=== Season 9 (1983–84) ===
No. overall	No. in season	Host(s)	Musical guest(s)	Original release date
160	1	Brandon Tartikoff	John Cougar Mellencamp	October 8, 1983
161	2	Danny DeVito and Rhea Perlman	Eddy Grant	October 15, 1983
162	3	John Candy	Men at Work	October 22, 1983
163	4	Betty Thomas	Stray Cats	November 5, 1983
164	5	Teri Garr	Mick Fleetwood's Zoo	November 12, 1983
165	6	Jerry Lewis	Loverboy	November 19, 1983
166	7	The Smothers Brothers	Big Country	December 3, 1983
167	8	Flip Wilson	Stevie Nicks	December 10, 1983
168	9	Father Guido Sarducci	Huey Lewis and the News	January 14, 1984
169	10	Michael and Mary Palin	The Motels	January 21, 1984
170	11	Don Rickles	Billy Idol	January 28, 1984
171	12	Robin Williams	Adam Ant	February 11, 1984
172	13	Jamie Lee Curtis	The Fixx	February 18, 1984
173	14	Edwin Newman	Kool & the Gang	February 25, 1984
174	15	Billy Crystal	Al Jarreau	March 17, 1984
175	16	Michael Douglas	Deniece Williams	April 7, 1984
176	17	George McGovern	Madness	April 14, 1984
177	18	Barry Bostwick	Spinal Tap	May 5, 1984
178	19	Billy Crystal, Ed Koch, Edwin Newman, Father Guido Sarducci, Betty Thomas	The Cars	May 12, 1984

=== Season 10 (1984–85) ===
No. overall	No. in season	Host(s)	Musical guest(s)	Original release date
179	1	(none)	Thompson Twins	October 6, 1984
180	2	Bob Uecker	Peter Wolf	October 13, 1984
181	3	Jesse Jackson	Andrae Crouch; Wintley Phipps	October 20, 1984
182	4	Michael McKean	Chaka Khan; The Folksmen	November 3, 1984
183	5	George Carlin	Frankie Goes to Hollywood	November 10, 1984
184	6	Ed Asner	The Kinks	November 17, 1984
185	7	Ed Begley, Jr.	Billy Squier	December 1, 1984
186	8	Ringo Starr	Herbie Hancock	December 8, 1984
187	9	Eddie Murphy	The Honeydrippers	December 15, 1984
188	10	Kathleen Turner	John Waite	January 12, 1985
189	11	Roy Scheider	Billy Ocean	January 19, 1985
190	12	Alex Karras	Tina Turner	February 2, 1985
191	13	Harry Anderson	Bryan Adams	February 9, 1985
192	14	Pamela Sue Martin	Power Station	February 16, 1985
193	15	Mr. T Hulk Hogan	The Commodores	March 30, 1985
194	16	Christopher Reeve	Santana	April 6, 1985
195	17	Howard Cosell	Greg Kihn	April 13, 1985

=== Season 11 (1985–86) ===
No. overall	No. in season	Host(s)	Musical guest(s)	Original release date
196	1	Madonna	Simple Minds	November 9, 1985
197	2	Chevy Chase	Sheila E	November 16, 1985
198	3	Pee-wee Herman	Queen Ida & the Bon Temps Zydeco Band	November 23, 1985
199	4	John Lithgow	Mr. Mister	December 7, 1985
200	5	Tom Hanks	Sade	December 14, 1985
201	6	Teri Garr	The Dream Academy; The Cult	December 21, 1985
202	7	Harry Dean Stanton	The Replacements	January 18, 1986
203	8	Dudley Moore	Al Green	January 25, 1986
204	9	Ron Reagan	The Nelsons	February 8, 1986
205	10	Jerry Hall	Stevie Ray Vaughan; Double Trouble	February 15, 1986
206	11	Jay Leno	The Neville Brothers	February 22, 1986
207	12	Griffin Dunne	Rosanne Cash	March 15, 1986
208	13	George Wendt; Francis Ford Coppola	Philip Glass	March 22, 1986
209	14	Oprah Winfrey	Joe Jackson	April 12, 1986
210	15	Tony Danza	Laurie Anderson	April 19, 1986
211	16	Catherine Oxenberg; Paul Simon	Paul Simon; Ladysmith Black Mambazo	May 10, 1986
212	17	Jimmy Breslin	Level 42; E.G. Daily	May 17, 1986
213	18	Anjelica Huston; Billy Martin	George Clinton; Parliament-Funkadelic	May 24, 1986

=== Season 12 (1986–87) ===
No. overall	No. in season	Host(s)	Musical guest	Original release date
214	1	Sigourney Weaver	None	October 11, 1986
215	2	Malcolm-Jamal Warner	Run-DMC	October 18, 1986
216	3	Rosanna Arquette	Ric Ocasek	November 8, 1986
217	4	Sam Kinison	Lou Reed	November 15, 1986
218	5	Robin Williams	Paul Simon	November 22, 1986
219	6	Chevy Chase; Steve Martin; Martin Short	Randy Newman	December 6, 1986
220	7	Steve Guttenberg	The Pretenders	December 13, 1986
221	8	William Shatner	Lone Justice	December 20, 1986
222	9	Joe Montana; Walter Payton	Deborah Harry	January 24, 1987
223	10	Paul Shaffer	Bruce Hornsby & the Range	January 31, 1987
224	11	Bronson Pinchot	Paul Young	February 14, 1987
225	12	Willie Nelson	Willie Nelson	February 21, 1987
226	13	Valerie Bertinelli	Robert Cray Band	February 28, 1987
227	14	Bill Murray	Percy Sledge	March 21, 1987
228	15	Charlton Heston	Wynton Marsalis	March 28, 1987
229	16	John Lithgow	Anita Baker	April 11, 1987
230	17	John Larroquette	Timbuk 3	April 18, 1987
231	18	Mark Harmon	Suzanne Vega	May 9, 1987
232	19	Garry Shandling	Los Lobos	May 16, 1987
233	20	Dennis Hopper	Roy Orbison	May 23, 1987

=== Season 13 (1987–88) ===
No. overall	No. in season	Host	Musical guest(s)	Original release date
234	1	Steve Martin	Sting	October 17, 1987
235	2	Sean Penn	LL Cool J Michael Penn	October 24, 1987
236	3	Dabney Coleman	The Cars	October 31, 1987
237	4	Robert Mitchum	Simply Red	November 14, 1987
238	5	Candice Bergen	Cher	November 21, 1987
239	6	Danny DeVito	Bryan Ferry	December 5, 1987
240	7	Angie Dickinson	Buster Poindexter; David Gilmour	December 12, 1987
241	8	Paul Simon	Linda Ronstadt	December 19, 1987
242	9	Robin Williams	James Taylor	January 23, 1988
243	10	Carl Weathers	Robbie Robertson	January 30, 1988
244	11	Justine Bateman	Terence Trent D'Arby	February 13, 1988
245	12	Tom Hanks	Randy Travis	February 20, 1988
246	13	Judge Reinhold	10,000 Maniacs	February 27, 1988

=== Season 14 (1988–89) ===
No. overall	No. in season	Host	Musical guest(s)	Original release date
247	1	Tom Hanks	Keith Richards	October 8, 1988
248	2	Matthew Broderick	The Sugarcubes	October 15, 1988
249	3	John Larroquette	Randy Newman & Mark Knopfler	October 22, 1988
250	4	Matthew Modine	Edie Brickell and New Bohemians	November 5, 1988
251	5	Demi Moore	Johnny Clegg & Savuka	November 12, 1988
252	6	John Lithgow	Tracy Chapman	November 19, 1988
253	7	Danny DeVito	The Bangles	December 3, 1988
254	8	Kevin Kline	Bobby McFerrin	December 10, 1988
255	9	Melanie Griffith	Little Feat	December 17, 1988
256	10	John Malkovich	Anita Baker	January 21, 1989
257	11	Tony Danza	John Hiatt	January 28, 1989
258	12	Ted Danson	Luther Vandross	February 11, 1989
259	13	Leslie Nielsen	Cowboy Junkies	February 18, 1989
260	14	Glenn Close	Gipsy Kings	February 25, 1989
261	15	Mary Tyler Moore	Elvis Costello	March 25, 1989
262	16	Mel Gibson	Living Colour	April 1, 1989
263	17	Dolly Parton	Dolly Parton	April 15, 1989
264	18	Geena Davis	John Mellencamp	April 22, 1989
265	19	Wayne Gretzky	Fine Young Cannibals	May 13, 1989
266	20	Steve Martin	Tom Petty & the Heartbreakers	May 20, 1989

=== Season 15 (1989–90) ===
No. overall	No. in season	Host	Musical guest(s)	Original release date
267	1	Bruce Willis	Neil Young	September 30, 1989
268	2	Rick Moranis	Rickie Lee Jones	October 7, 1989
269	3	Kathleen Turner	Billy Joel	October 21, 1989
270	4	James Woods	Don Henley	October 28, 1989
271	5	Chris Evert	Eurythmics	November 11, 1989
272	6	Woody Harrelson	David Byrne	November 18, 1989
273	7	John Goodman	k.d. lang	December 2, 1989
274	8	Robert Wagner	Linda Ronstadt & Aaron Neville	December 9, 1989
275	9	Andie MacDowell	Tracy Chapman	December 16, 1989
276	10	Ed O'Neill	Harry Connick, Jr.	January 13, 1990
277	11	Christopher Walken	Bonnie Raitt	January 20, 1990
278	12	Quincy Jones	Quincy Jones; Tevin Campbell; Kool Moe Dee; Big Daddy Kane	February 10, 1990
279	13	Tom Hanks	Aerosmith	February 17, 1990
280	14	Fred Savage	Technotronic	February 24, 1990
281	15	Rob Lowe	The Pogues	March 17, 1990
282	16	Debra Winger	Eric Clapton	March 24, 1990
283	17	Corbin Bernsen	The Smithereens	April 14, 1990
284	18	Alec Baldwin	The B-52's	April 21, 1990
285	19	Andrew Dice Clay	Julee Cruise; Spanic Boys	May 12, 1990
286	20	Candice Bergen	The Notting Hillbillies	May 19, 1990

=== Season 16 (1990–91) ===
No. overall	No. in season	Host	Musical guest	Original release date
287	1	Kyle MacLachlan	Sinéad O'Connor	September 29, 1990
288	2	Susan Lucci	Hothouse Flowers	October 6, 1990
289	3	George Steinbrenner	Morris Day & The Time	October 20, 1990
290	4	Patrick Swayze	Mariah Carey	October 27, 1990
291	5	Jimmy Smits	World Party	November 10, 1990
292	6	Dennis Hopper	Paul Simon	November 17, 1990
293	7	John Goodman	Faith No More	December 1, 1990
294	8	Tom Hanks	Edie Brickell & New Bohemians	December 8, 1990
295	9	Dennis Quaid	The Neville Brothers	December 15, 1990
296	10	Joe Mantegna	Vanilla Ice	January 12, 1991
297	11	Sting	Sting	January 19, 1991
298	12	Kevin Bacon	INXS	February 9, 1991
299	13	Roseanne Barr	Deee-Lite	February 16, 1991
300	14	Alec Baldwin	Whitney Houston	February 23, 1991
301	15	Michael J. Fox	The Black Crowes	March 16, 1991
302	16	Jeremy Irons	Fishbone	March 23, 1991
303	17	Catherine O'Hara	R.E.M.	April 13, 1991
304	18	Steven Seagal	Michael Bolton	April 20, 1991
305	19	Delta Burke	Chris Isaak	May 11, 1991
306	20	George Wendt	Elvis Costello	May 18, 1991

=== Season 17 (1991–92) ===
No. overall	No. in season	Host(s)	Musical guest(s)	Original release date
307	1	Michael Jordan	Public Enemy	September 28, 1991
308	2	Jeff Daniels	Color Me Badd	October 5, 1991
309	3	Kirstie Alley	Tom Petty & The Heartbreakers	October 12, 1991
310	4	Christian Slater	Bonnie Raitt	October 26, 1991
311	5	Kiefer Sutherland	Skid Row	November 2, 1991
312	6	Linda Hamilton	Mariah Carey	November 16, 1991
313	7	Macaulay Culkin	Tin Machine	November 23, 1991
314	8	MC Hammer	MC Hammer	December 7, 1991
315	9	Steve Martin	James Taylor	December 14, 1991
316	10	Rob Morrow	Nirvana	January 11, 1992
317	11	Chevy Chase	Robbie Robertson	January 18, 1992
318	12	Susan Dey	C&C Music Factory	February 8, 1992
319	13	Jason Priestley	Teenage Fanclub	February 15, 1992
320	14	Roseanne Arnold; Tom Arnold	Red Hot Chili Peppers	February 22, 1992
321	15	John Goodman	Garth Brooks	March 14, 1992
322	16	Mary Stuart Masterson	En Vogue	March 21, 1992
323	17	Sharon Stone	Pearl Jam	April 11, 1992
324	18	Jerry Seinfeld	Annie Lennox	April 18, 1992
325	19	Tom Hanks	Bruce Springsteen	May 9, 1992
326	20	Woody Harrelson	Vanessa Williams	May 16, 1992

=== Season 18 (1992–93) ===
No. overall	No. in season	Host	Musical guest(s)	Original release date
327	1	Nicolas Cage	Bobby Brown	September 26, 1992
328	2	Tim Robbins	Sinéad O'Connor	October 3, 1992
329	3	Joe Pesci	Spin Doctors	October 10, 1992
330	4	Christopher Walken	Arrested Development	October 24, 1992
331	5	Catherine O'Hara	10,000 Maniacs	October 31, 1992
332	6	Michael Keaton	Morrissey	November 14, 1992
333	7	Sinbad	Sade	November 21, 1992
334	8	Tom Arnold	Neil Young	December 5, 1992
335	9	Glenn Close	The Black Crowes	December 12, 1992
336	10	Danny DeVito	Bon Jovi	January 9, 1993
337	11	Harvey Keitel	Madonna	January 16, 1993
338	12	Luke Perry	Mick Jagger	February 6, 1993
339	13	Alec Baldwin	Paul McCartney	February 13, 1993
340	14	Bill Murray	Sting	February 20, 1993
341	15	John Goodman	Mary J. Blige	March 13, 1993
342	16	Miranda Richardson	Soul Asylum	March 20, 1993
343	17	Jason Alexander	Peter Gabriel	April 10, 1993
344	18	Kirstie Alley	Lenny Kravitz	April 17, 1993
345	19	Christina Applegate	Midnight Oil	May 8, 1993
346	20	Kevin Kline	Willie Nelson & Paul Simon	May 15, 1993

=== Season 19 (1993–94) ===
No. overall	No. in season	Host(s)	Musical guest	Original release date
347	1	Charles Barkley	Nirvana	September 25, 1993
348	2	Shannen Doherty	Cypress Hill	October 2, 1993
349	3	Jeff Goldblum	Aerosmith	October 9, 1993
350	4	John Malkovich	Billy Joel	October 23, 1993
351	5	Christian Slater	The Smashing Pumpkins	October 30, 1993
352	6	Rosie O'Donnell	James Taylor	November 13, 1993
353	7	Nicole Kidman	Stone Temple Pilots	November 20, 1993
354	8	Charlton Heston	Paul Westerberg	December 4, 1993
355	9	Sally Field	Tony! Toni! Toné!	December 11, 1993
356	10	Jason Patric	Blind Melon	January 8, 1994
357	11	Sara Gilbert	Counting Crows	January 15, 1994
358	12	Patrick Stewart	Salt-N-Pepa	February 5, 1994
359	13	Alec Baldwin and Kim Basinger	UB40	February 12, 1994
360	14	Martin Lawrence	Crash Test Dummies	February 19, 1994
361	15	Nancy Kerrigan	Aretha Franklin	March 12, 1994
362	16	Helen Hunt	Snoop Doggy Dogg	March 19, 1994
363	17	Kelsey Grammer	Dwight Yoakam	April 9, 1994
364	18	Emilio Estevez	Pearl Jam	April 16, 1994
365	19	John Goodman	The Pretenders	May 7, 1994
366	20	Heather Locklear	Janet Jackson	May 14, 1994

=== Season 20 (1994–95) ===
No. overall	No. in season	Host	Musical guest(s)	Original release date
367	1	Steve Martin	Eric Clapton	September 24, 1994
368	2	Marisa Tomei	Bonnie Raitt	October 1, 1994
369	3	John Travolta	Seal	October 15, 1994
370	4	Dana Carvey	Edie Brickell	October 22, 1994
371	5	Sarah Jessica Parker	R.E.M.	November 12, 1994
372	6	John Turturro	Tom Petty	November 19, 1994
373	7	Roseanne	Green Day	December 3, 1994
374	8	Alec Baldwin	Beastie Boys	December 10, 1994
375	9	George Foreman	Hole	December 17, 1994
376	10	Jeff Daniels	Luscious Jackson	January 14, 1995
377	11	David Hyde Pierce	Live	January 21, 1995
378	12	Bob Newhart	Des'ree	February 11, 1995
379	13	Deion Sanders	Bon Jovi	February 18, 1995
380	14	George Clooney	The Cranberries	February 25, 1995
381	15	Paul Reiser	Annie Lennox	March 18, 1995
382	16	John Goodman	The Tragically Hip	March 25, 1995
383	17	Damon Wayans	Dionne Farris	April 8, 1995
384	18	Courteney Cox	Dave Matthews Band	April 15, 1995
385	19	Bob Saget	TLC	May 6, 1995
386	20	David Duchovny	Rod Stewart	May 13, 1995

=== Season 21 (1995–96) ===
No. overall	No. in season	Host	Musical guest	Original release date
387	1	Mariel Hemingway	Blues Traveler	September 30, 1995
388	2	Chevy Chase	Lisa Loeb & Nine Stories	October 7, 1995
389	3	David Schwimmer	Natalie Merchant	October 21, 1995
390	4	Gabriel Byrne	Alanis Morissette	October 28, 1995
391	5	Quentin Tarantino	The Smashing Pumpkins	November 11, 1995
392	6	Laura Leighton	Rancid	November 18, 1995
393	7	Anthony Edwards	Foo Fighters	December 2, 1995
394	8	David Alan Grier	Silverchair	December 9, 1995
395	9	Madeline Kahn	Bush	December 16, 1995
396	10	Christopher Walken	Joan Osborne	January 13, 1996
397	11	Alec Baldwin	Tori Amos	January 20, 1996
398	12	Danny Aiello	Coolio	February 10, 1996
399	13	Tom Arnold	Tupac Shakur	February 17, 1996
400	14	Elle Macpherson	Sting	February 24, 1996
401	15	John Goodman	Everclear	March 16, 1996
402	16	Phil Hartman	Gin Blossoms	March 23, 1996
403	17	Steve Forbes	Rage Against the Machine	April 13, 1996
404	18	Teri Hatcher	Dave Matthews Band	April 20, 1996
405	19	Christine Baranski	The Cure	May 11, 1996
406	20	Jim Carrey	Soundgarden	May 18, 1996

=== Season 22 (1996–97) ===
No. overall	No. in season	Host	Musical guest	Original release date
407	1	Tom Hanks	Tom Petty & the Heartbreakers	September 28, 1996
408	2	Lisa Kudrow	Sheryl Crow	October 5, 1996
409	3	Bill Pullman	New Edition	October 19, 1996
410	4	Dana Carvey	Dr. Dre	October 26, 1996
411	5	Chris Rock	The Wallflowers	November 2, 1996
412	6	Robert Downey Jr.	Fiona Apple	November 16, 1996
413	7	Phil Hartman	Bush	November 23, 1996
414	8	Martin Short	No Doubt	December 7, 1996
415	9	Rosie O'Donnell	Whitney Houston	December 14, 1996
416	10	Kevin Spacey	Beck	January 11, 1997
417	11	David Alan Grier	Snoop Doggy Dogg	January 18, 1997
418	12	Neve Campbell	David Bowie	February 8, 1997
419	13	Chevy Chase	Live	February 15, 1997
420	14	Alec Baldwin	Tina Turner	February 22, 1997
421	15	Sting	Veruca Salt	March 15, 1997
422	16	Mike Myers	Aerosmith	March 22, 1997
423	17	Rob Lowe	Spice Girls	April 12, 1997
424	18	Pamela Anderson	Rollins Band	April 19, 1997
425	19	John Goodman	Jewel	May 10, 1997
426	20	Jeff Goldblum	En Vogue	May 17, 1997

=== Season 23 (1997–98) ===
No. overall	No. in season	Host	Musical guest(s)	Original release date
427	1	Sylvester Stallone	Jamiroquai	September 27, 1997
428	2	Matthew Perry	Oasis	October 4, 1997
429	3	Brendan Fraser	Björk	October 18, 1997
430	4	Chris Farley	The Mighty Mighty Bosstones	October 25, 1997
431	5	Jon Lovitz	Jane's Addiction	November 8, 1997
432	6	Claire Danes	Mariah Carey	November 15, 1997
433	7	Rudolph Giuliani	Sarah McLachlan	November 22, 1997
434	8	Nathan Lane	Metallica	December 6, 1997
435	9	Helen Hunt	Hanson	December 13, 1997
436	10	Samuel L. Jackson	Ben Folds Five	January 10, 1998
437	11	Sarah Michelle Gellar	Portishead	January 17, 1998
438	12	John Goodman	Paula Cole	February 7, 1998
439	13	Roma Downey	Missy Misdemeanor Elliott	February 14, 1998
440	14	Garth Brooks	Garth Brooks	February 28, 1998
441	15	Scott Wolf	Natalie Imbruglia	March 7, 1998
442	16	Julianne Moore	Backstreet Boys	March 14, 1998
443	17	Steve Buscemi	Third Eye Blind	April 4, 1998
444	18	Greg Kinnear	All Saints	April 11, 1998
445	19	Matthew Broderick	Natalie Merchant	May 2, 1998
446	20	David Duchovny	Puff Daddy & Jimmy Page	May 9, 1998

=== Season 24 (1998–99) ===
No. overall	No. in season	Host	Musical guest(s)	Original release date
447	1	Cameron Diaz	The Smashing Pumpkins	September 26, 1998
448	2	Kelsey Grammer	Sheryl Crow	October 3, 1998
449	3	Lucy Lawless	Elliott Smith	October 17, 1998
450	4	Ben Stiller	Alanis Morissette	October 24, 1998
451	5	David Spade	Eagle-Eye Cherry	November 7, 1998
452	6	Joan Allen	Jewel	November 14, 1998
453	7	Jennifer Love Hewitt	Beastie Boys	November 21, 1998
454	8	Vince Vaughn	Lauryn Hill	December 5, 1998
455	9	Alec Baldwin	Luciano Pavarotti; Vanessa Williams; Philadelphia Boys Choir & Chorale	December 12, 1998
456	10	Bill Paxton	Beck	January 9, 1999
457	11	James Van Der Beek	Everlast	January 16, 1999
458	12	Gwyneth Paltrow	Barenaked Ladies	February 6, 1999
459	13	Brendan Fraser	Busta Rhymes; The Roots	February 13, 1999
460	14	Bill Murray	Lucinda Williams	February 20, 1999
461	15	Ray Romano	The Corrs	March 13, 1999
462	16	Drew Barrymore	Garbage	March 20, 1999
463	17	John Goodman	Tom Petty & the Heartbreakers	April 10, 1999
464	18	Cuba Gooding Jr.	Ricky Martin	May 8, 1999
465	19	Sarah Michelle Gellar	Backstreet Boys	May 15, 1999

=== Season 25 (1999–2000) ===
No. overall	No. in season	Host	Musical guest(s)	Original release date
466	1	Jerry Seinfeld	David Bowie	October 2, 1999
467	2	Heather Graham	Marc Anthony	October 16, 1999
468	3	Norm Macdonald	Dr. Dre featuring Snoop Dogg & Eminem	October 23, 1999
469	4	Dylan McDermott	Foo Fighters	November 6, 1999
470	5	Garth Brooks	Garth Brooks as Chris Gaines	November 13, 1999
471	6	Jennifer Aniston	Sting	November 20, 1999
472	7	Christina Ricci	Beck	December 4, 1999
473	8	Danny DeVito	R.E.M.	December 11, 1999
474	9	Jamie Foxx	Blink-182	January 8, 2000
475	10	Freddie Prinze Jr.	Macy Gray	January 15, 2000
476	11	Alan Cumming	Jennifer Lopez	February 5, 2000
477	12	Julianna Margulies	DMX	February 12, 2000
478	13	Ben Affleck	Fiona Apple	February 19, 2000
479	14	Joshua Jackson	'N Sync	March 11, 2000
480	15	The Rock	AC/DC	March 18, 2000
481	16	Christopher Walken	Christina Aguilera	April 8, 2000
482	17	Tobey Maguire	Sisqó	April 15, 2000
483	18	John Goodman	Neil Young	May 6, 2000
484	19	Britney Spears	Britney Spears	May 13, 2000
485	20	Jackie Chan	Kid Rock	May 20, 2000

=== Season 26 (2000–01) ===
No. overall	No. in season	Host	Musical guest(s)	Original release date
486	1	Rob Lowe	Eminem	October 7, 2000
487	2	Kate Hudson	Radiohead	October 14, 2000
488	3	Dana Carvey	The Wallflowers	October 21, 2000
489	4	Charlize Theron	Paul Simon	November 4, 2000
490	5	Calista Flockhart	Ricky Martin	November 11, 2000
491	6	Tom Green	David Gray	November 18, 2000
492	7	Val Kilmer	U2	December 9, 2000
493	8	Lucy Liu	Jay-Z	December 16, 2000
494	9	Charlie Sheen	Nelly Furtado	January 13, 2001
495	10	Mena Suvari	Lenny Kravitz	January 20, 2001
496	11	Jennifer Lopez	Jennifer Lopez	February 10, 2001
497	12	Sean Hayes	Shaggy	February 17, 2001
498	13	Katie Holmes	Dave Matthews Band	February 24, 2001
499	14	Conan O'Brien	Don Henley	March 10, 2001
500	15	Julia Stiles	Aerosmith	March 17, 2001
501	16	Alec Baldwin	Coldplay	April 7, 2001
502	17	Renée Zellweger	Eve	April 14, 2001
503	18	Pierce Brosnan	Destiny's Child	May 5, 2001
504	19	Lara Flynn Boyle	Bon Jovi	May 12, 2001
505	20	Christopher Walken	Weezer	May 19, 2001

=== Season 27 (2001–02) ===
No. overall	No. in season	Host	Musical guest(s)	Original release date
506	1	Reese Witherspoon	Alicia Keys	September 29, 2001
507	2	Seann William Scott	Sum 41	October 6, 2001
508	3	Drew Barrymore	Macy Gray	October 13, 2001
509	4	John Goodman	Ja Rule	November 3, 2001
510	5	Gwyneth Paltrow	Ryan Adams	November 10, 2001
511	6	Billy Bob Thornton	Creed	November 17, 2001
512	7	Derek Jeter	Bubba Sparxxx; Shakira	December 1, 2001
513	8	Hugh Jackman	Mick Jagger	December 8, 2001
514	9	Ellen DeGeneres	No Doubt	December 15, 2001
515	10	Josh Hartnett	Pink	January 12, 2002
516	11	Jack Black	The Strokes	January 19, 2002
517	12	Britney Spears	Britney Spears	February 2, 2002
518	13	Jonny Moseley	Outkast	March 2, 2002
519	14	Jon Stewart	India.Arie	March 9, 2002
520	15	Ian McKellen	Kylie Minogue	March 16, 2002
521	16	Cameron Diaz	Jimmy Eat World	April 6, 2002
522	17	The Rock	Andrew W.K.	April 13, 2002
523	18	Alec Baldwin	P.O.D.	April 20, 2002
524	19	Kirsten Dunst	Eminem	May 11, 2002
525	20	Winona Ryder	Moby	May 18, 2002

=== Season 28 (2002–03) ===
No. overall	No. in season	Host	Musical guest(s)	Original release date
526	1	Matt Damon	Bruce Springsteen & the E Street Band	October 5, 2002
527	2	Sarah Michelle Gellar	Faith Hill	October 12, 2002
528	3	John McCain	The White Stripes	October 19, 2002
529	4	Eric McCormack	Jay-Z	November 2, 2002
530	5	Nia Vardalos	Eve	November 9, 2002
531	6	Brittany Murphy	Nelly	November 16, 2002
532	7	Robert De Niro	Norah Jones	December 7, 2002
533	8	Al Gore	Phish	December 14, 2002
534	9	Jeff Gordon	Avril Lavigne	January 11, 2003
535	10	Ray Liotta	The Donnas	January 18, 2003
536	11	Matthew McConaughey	Dixie Chicks	February 8, 2003
537	12	Jennifer Garner	Beck	February 15, 2003
538	13	Christopher Walken	Foo Fighters	February 22, 2003
539	14	Queen Latifah	Ms. Dynamite	March 8, 2003
540	15	Salma Hayek	Christina Aguilera	March 15, 2003
541	16	Bernie Mac	Good Charlotte	April 5, 2003
542	17	Ray Romano	Zwan	April 12, 2003
543	18	Ashton Kutcher	50 Cent	May 3, 2003
544	19	Adrien Brody	Sean Paul; Wayne Wonder	May 10, 2003
545	20	Dan Aykroyd	Beyoncé	May 17, 2003

=== Season 29 (2003–04) ===
No. overall	No. in season	Host(s)	Musical guest(s)	Original release date
546	1	Jack Black	John Mayer	October 4, 2003
547	2	Justin Timberlake	Justin Timberlake	October 11, 2003
548	3	Halle Berry	Britney Spears	October 18, 2003
549	4	Kelly Ripa	Outkast	November 1, 2003
550	5	Andy Roddick	Dave Matthews	November 8, 2003
551	6	Alec Baldwin	Missy Elliott	November 15, 2003
552	7	Al Sharpton	Pink	December 6, 2003
553	8	Elijah Wood	Jet	December 13, 2003
554	9	Jennifer Aniston	The Black Eyed Peas	January 10, 2004
555	10	Jessica Simpson; Nick Lachey	G-Unit	January 17, 2004
556	11	Megan Mullally	Clay Aiken	February 7, 2004
557	12	Drew Barrymore	Kelis	February 14, 2004
558	13	Christina Aguilera	Maroon 5	February 21, 2004
559	14	Colin Firth	Norah Jones	March 6, 2004
560	15	Ben Affleck	N*E*R*D	March 13, 2004
561	16	Donald Trump	Toots & the Maytals featuring Ben Harper, Jack Johnson, Bootsy Collins, and The Roots	April 3, 2004
562	17	Janet Jackson	Janet Jackson	April 10, 2004
563	18	Lindsay Lohan	Usher	May 1, 2004
564	19	Snoop Dogg	Avril Lavigne	May 8, 2004
565	20	Mary-Kate and Ashley Olsen	J-Kwon	May 15, 2004

=== Season 30 (2004–05) ===
No. overall	No. in season	Host	Musical guest(s)	Original release date
566	1	Ben Affleck	Nelly	October 2, 2004
567	2	Queen Latifah	Queen Latifah	October 9, 2004
568	3	Jude Law	Ashlee Simpson	October 23, 2004
569	4	Kate Winslet	Eminem	October 30, 2004
570	5	Liam Neeson	Modest Mouse	November 13, 2004
571	6	Luke Wilson	U2	November 20, 2004
572	7	Colin Farrell	Scissor Sisters	December 11, 2004
573	8	Robert De Niro	Destiny's Child	December 18, 2004
574	9	Topher Grace	The Killers	January 15, 2005
575	10	Paul Giamatti	Ludacris featuring Sum 41	January 22, 2005
576	11	Paris Hilton	Keane	February 5, 2005
577	12	Jason Bateman	Kelly Clarkson	February 12, 2005
578	13	Hilary Swank	50 Cent	February 19, 2005
579	14	David Spade	Jack Johnson	March 12, 2005
580	15	Ashton Kutcher	Gwen Stefani	March 19, 2005
581	16	Cameron Diaz	Green Day	April 9, 2005
582	17	Tom Brady	Beck	April 16, 2005
583	18	Johnny Knoxville	System of a Down	May 7, 2005
584	19	Will Ferrell	Queens of the Stone Age	May 14, 2005
585	20	Lindsay Lohan	Coldplay	May 21, 2005

== See also ==
- List of Saturday Night Live episodes (season 31–present)
