= List of Saturday Night Live home video releases =

Traditionally, retail home video releases of Saturday Night Live material have consisted of "Best Of" compilations, comprising select performances (typically sketches) of past cast members, and notable guest hosts. Beginning in 1999, DVD releases were distributed by Lions Gate Home Entertainment under license from NBC, predating the network's merger with Universal, following Lions Gate's acquisition of NBC's previous distributor Trimark. Following the establishment of NBCUniversal in 2004, Universal Studios, owners of NBC, Saturday Night Live's broadcast home, ceased the existing arrangement of outside distribution of SNL material. While Lionsgate is no longer able to acquire new SNL-related content, they have retained reissuing rights to their existing SNL content library.

On December 5, 2006, Universal Pictures Home Entertainment released on DVD "Saturday Night Live: The Complete First Season," comprising complete episodes. Upon the set’s release, some criticism of its authenticity as complete and uncut episodes arose from reviewers and fans. This was due to the existence of original live copies, which in comparison to the "complete" episodes reveal edits and omissions, which are common among the rerun versions of the shows in the set. Following the successful sales of the first season, the next four seasons have been released. No subsequent releases are planned for the near future, due to prohibitive music licensing costs and the rise of streaming video.

== VHS releases ==
=== Specials ===
DVD Name	Release dates			Additional Information
DVD Name	Region 1	Region 2	Region 4	Additional Information
The Best of John Belushi	1985	| align="center" width="130px" |		
The Best of Dan Aykroyd	1986	| align="center" width="130px" |		
The Best of Chevy Chase	1987	| align="center" width="130px" |		
The Best of Gilda Radner	1989	| align="center" width="130px" |		
The Best of Eddie Murphy: Saturday Night Live	1989	| align="center" width="130px" |		
The Best of Saturday Night Live: Hosted By Robin Williams	1991			
The Best of Saturday Night Live: Hosted By Roseanne Arnold	1992			
The Best of Saturday Night Live: Hosted By Chevy Chase	1992			
The Best of Saturday Night Live: Hosted By Tom Hanks	1992			
The Best of Saturday Night Live: Hosted By Steve Martin	1992			
The Best of Saturday Night Live: Hosted By John Goodman	1993			
The Best of Saturday Night Live: Hosted By Eddie Murphy	1993			
The Best of Saturday Night Live: Hosted By Jerry Seinfeld	1993			
The Best of Saturday Night Live: Hosted By Lily Tomlin	1993			
The Best of Saturday Night Live: The Best of Dan Aykroyd	1994			
The Best of Saturday Night Live: The Best of Alec Baldwin	1994			
The Best of Saturday Night Live: Hosted By Danny DeVito	1994			
Saturday Night Live: Bad Boys	1998			
Saturday Night Live: A Tribute to Chris Farley	1998			
Saturday Night Live: A Tribute to Phil Hartman	1998			
Saturday Night Live: The Best of Eddie Murphy	1998			
Saturday Night Live: The Best of Dana Carvey	1999			
Saturday Night Live: The Best of Steve Martin	1999			
Saturday Night Live: The Best of Mike Myers	1999			
Saturday Night Live: The Best of Chris Rock	1999			
Saturday Night Live: The Best of Adam Sandler	1999			
Saturday Night Live: The Best of the Clinton Scandal	1999			
Saturday Night Live: Game Show Parodies	1999			
Saturday Night Live: The Best of Will Ferrell	2003			

== DVD releases ==
=== Seasons ===
DVD Name	Release dates			Additional Information
DVD Name	Region 1	Region 2	Region 4	Additional Information
SNL: The Complete First Season ^{2, 3}	December 5, 2006	July 16, 2007		
SNL: The Complete Second Season ^{2, 3}	December 4, 2007			
SNL: The Complete Third Season ^{2, 3}	May 13, 2008			
SNL: The Complete Fourth Season ^{2, 3}	December 2, 2008			
SNL: The Complete Fifth Season ^{2, 3}	December 1, 2009			

=== Specials ===
DVD Name	Release dates			Additional Information
DVD Name	Region 1	Region 2	Region 4	Additional Information
SNL: Bad Boys ^{3, 6}	January 1, 1998			
SNL: The Best of Adam Sandler ^{1, 3}	November 9, 1999			
SNL: The Best of Dana Carvey ^{1, 3}	February 15, 2000			
Ohh Nooo!!! Mr. Bill’s Classics! ^{3}	January 1, 2000			
SNL: The Best of Chris Farley ^{1, 3}	April 25, 2000			
SNL: The Best of Steve Martin ^{1, 3}	April 25, 2000			
SNL: The Best of Molly Shannon ^{1, 3}	August 12, 2003			
SNL: The Best of Will Ferrell, Volume 1 ^{1, 3}	August 12, 2003			
SNL: 25 Years of Music ^{1, 3}	August 12, 2003			
SNL: Christmas ^{1, 3}	October 28, 2003			
SNL: Halloween ^{1, 3}	October 28, 2003			
SNL: 25th Anniversary ^{1, 3}	February 24, 2004			
SNL: The Best of Chris Rock ^{1, 3}	February 24, 2004			
SNL: The Best of Eddie Murphy ^{1, 3}	February 24, 2004			
SNL: The Best of Mike Myers ^{1, 3}	February 24, 2004			
SNL: The Best of Phil Hartman ^{1, 3}	February 24, 2004			
SNL: The Best of Jimmy Fallon ^{2, 3}	January 25, 2005			
SNL: The Best of Jon Lovitz ^{1, 3}	June 7, 2005			
SNL: The Best of Tom Hanks ^{1, 3}	June 7, 2005			
SNL: The Best of Dan Aykroyd ^{1, 3}	September 6, 2005			
SNL: The Best of Gilda Radner ^{1, 3}	September 6, 2005			
SNL: The Best of John Belushi ^{1, 3}	September 6, 2005			
SNL: Live From New York - The First 5 Years ^{1, 3}	September 6, 2005			
SNL: The Best of Alec Baldwin ^{2, 3}	January 24, 2006			
SNL: The Best of David Spade ^{2, 3}	January 24, 2006			
SNL: The Best of Cheri Oteri ^{2, 3}	May 23, 2006			
SNL: The Best of Commercial Parodies ^{2, 3}	May 23, 2006			
SNL: The Best of Saturday TV Funhouse ^{2, 3}	October 24, 2006			
SNL: The Best of 06/07 ^{2, 4}	March 4, 2008			
SNL in the 80's: Lost and Found ^{2, 3}	March 4, 2008			
SNL: The Best of Amy Poehler ^{2, 4}	October 20, 2009			
SNL: The Best of Will Ferrell, Volume 3 ^{4, 5}	August 3, 2010			
SNL: The Best of 09/10 ^{2, 4}	March 13, 2011			

^{1} Distributed by Lions Gate Home Entertainment
^{2} Distributed by Universal Studios Home Entertainment
^{3} Aspect ratio: 4:3 (fullscreen)
^{4} Aspect ratio: 16:9 (widescreen)
^{5} Released in Canada only

^{6} Distributed by Trimark Home Video

== Episode downloads and online streaming ==
Following the creation of Hulu in a joint venture by NBC, in 2007, NBC-owned content, including Saturday Night Live material, was removed from video sharing sites, notably YouTube, to the exclusion of NBC.com and the aforementioned Hulu. Free, ad-supported streaming of new SNL episodes on NBC.com was announced on October 16, 2009. In 2013, an official Saturday Night Live YouTube channel was created, which hosts clips from the show, musical guest performances, and behind-the-scenes content. The channel has amassed over 15.4 million subscribers and 17.2 billion views as of February 2025.

In 2020, following the launch of NBC's online streaming service Peacock, the complete library of Saturday Night Live was made available to stream on the platform. NBC ended its content-sharing deal with Hulu in 2022, making SNL exclusively available to stream on Peacock.
