= Live from New York, it's Saturday Night! =

Catchphrase on Saturday Night Live

"Live from New York, it's Saturday Night!" (Note: Saturday Night was the original title of the show when it premiered in 1975; the phrase was retained when the show was renamed Saturday Night Live.) is a famous catchphrase typically featured on the American sketch comedy show Saturday Night Live, which runs on the NBC broadcast network. It is generally used as a way to end a cold opening sketch and lead into the opening credit montage. In the British version, the catchphrase was altered to "Live from London, it's Saturday Night!" to match its filming location.

== Origin ==
During the show's first season, the show was known simply as NBC's Saturday Night because ABC was broadcasting a program titled Saturday Night Live with Howard Cosell. Thus, the phrase for NBC was worded differently than ABC’s program. The phrase was kept intact even after ABC's SNL was canceled and NBC's Saturday Night adopted the SNL name for itself.

== Instances used ==
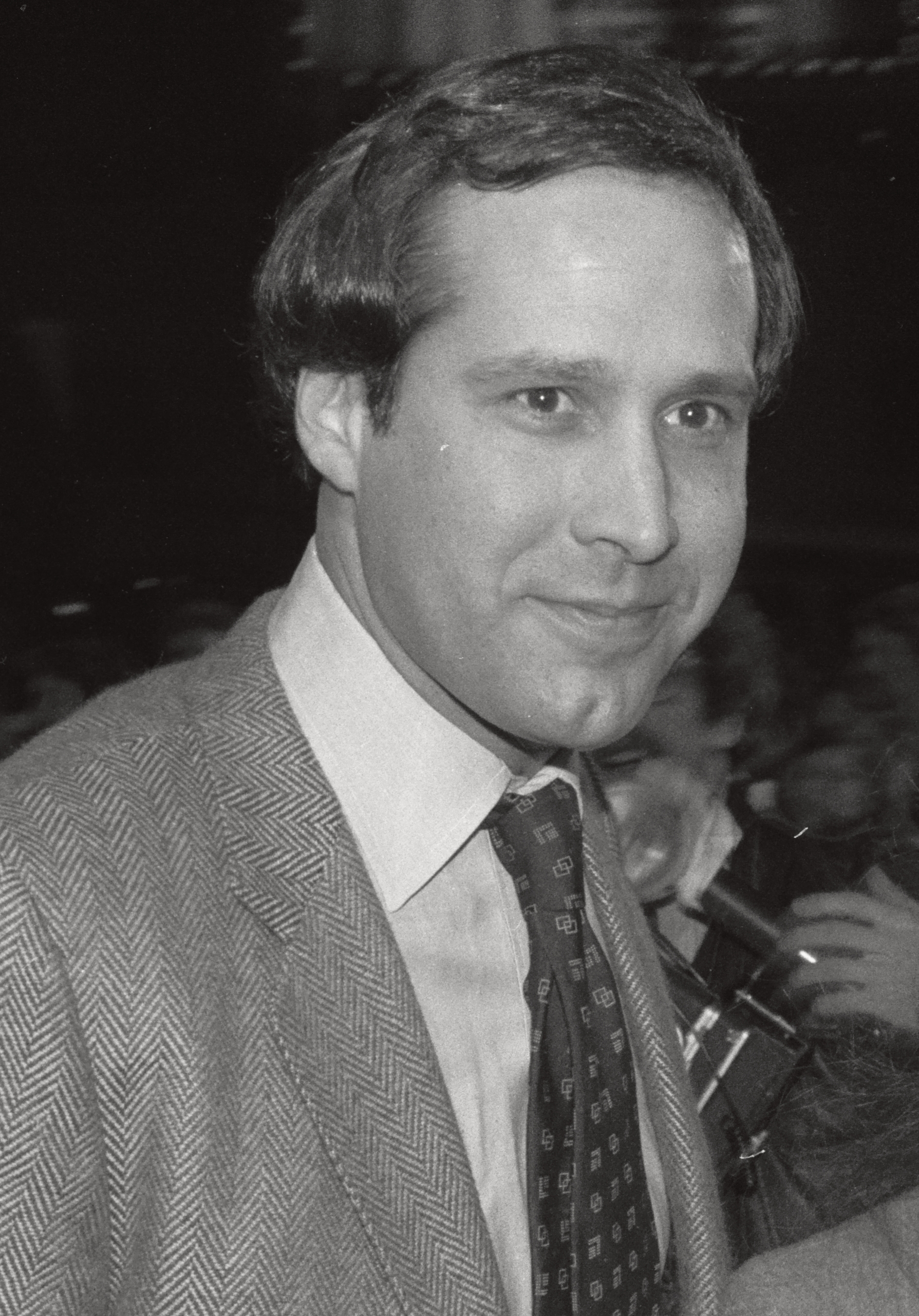
Chevy Chase said the line on the first show that aired, October 11, 1975.

The phrase is typically spoken by one or more of: a host, cast member(s), and/or the musical guest. It has been exclaimed in every season except one (the 1981–1982 season, the first full season with Dick Ebersol as producer, except the October 31, 1981 episode).

It was first said live on air by Chevy Chase, on SNL's first show on October 11, 1975. Lorne Michaels later explained in an oral history of the show that he made the decision to do a cold open on the Thursday night before the premiere episode. Using the phrase to signal the transition from the opening sketch to the rest of the show was a risky move, because it was immediately preceded by a surrealist sketch (indeed, the show's very first one) and the audience was not yet familiar with the show's format.

For all but two of the first season's 24 episodes (Garrett Morris when Richard Pryor hosted and Gerald Ford when Ron Nessen hosted), Chase delivered the phrase after a pratfall of some kind. Even when the show is not aired on a Saturday—such as the Saturday Night Live Weekend Update Thursday specials aired from 2008 to 2012, and again in 2017—the traditional line is used.

The person delivering the phrase usually breaks character and the fourth wall, in that the phrase is normally not spoken to other cast members as part of the regular dialogue in the opening sketch. Instead, the person suddenly turns (if not already facing downstage) and delivers the phrase directly to the audience and the camera with a full-throated shout. At the same time, the camera zooms in for a tight close-up shot of the person's face, followed by a dissolve or smash cut to the show's opening montage and titles. In other sketches, when the phrase is delivered by multiple cast members, the camera usually zooms out as they shout the line.

The line has been delivered the most times by former cast member Kate McKinnon, who has done so 74 times, as of Season 51. She is closely followed by former SNL cast member Darrell Hammond. A complete list of the most times saying the line reveals that cast members have done it the most. The non-cast member with the most LFNY lines is Alec Baldwin.

== Readings by special guests ==
The line has occasionally been given to a non-host/non-cast member for cameo purposes. This could be for stars like Brad Pitt and Dwayne "The Rock" Johnson, or for more unusual celebrities like Ron Darling, John McLaughlin (on October 26, 1991), Monica Lewinsky, Who Wants to Be a Millionaire winner John Carpenter, WWE chairman Vince McMahon (on March 18, 2000), Mayor of New York City Rudy Giuliani (on September 29, 2001, two weeks after the September 11 attacks), Carolyn Kepcher (on April 3, 2004), Al Sharpton (on November 2, 2013), Jason Aldean (on October 7, 2017, after paying tribute to the lives lost in the 2017 Las Vegas shooting and to the late Tom Petty), Stormy Daniels (on May 5, 2018), or Senator-elect James Talarico (on November 7, 2026). Guest choristers said the line after singing on December 15, 2012, in the aftermath of the Sandy Hook elementary school shooting, but read it in a more restrained tone.

=== Presidents and presidential hopefuls ===
Gerald Ford opened the show with the phrase (in a pre-recorded segment) on April 17, 1976, which came during his presidency, when press secretary Ron Nessen was host. A series of presidential and vice presidential hopefuls have also announced the phrase on their appearances on the show, beginning with Bob Dole on November 16, 1996 (coming after the 1996 election). It was announced by Barack Obama on November 3, 2007, by Hillary Clinton on March 1, 2008, by Sarah Palin on October 18, 2008, by John McCain on November 1, 2008, by Elizabeth Warren on March 7, 2020, by Nikki Haley on February 3, 2024, and by Kamala Harris on November 2, 2024.

== In popular culture ==
In The Simpsons episode "'Scuse Me While I Miss the Sky", the line is spoken by a sleep-deprived Marge.

In the second part of The Golden Girls two-part special "Home Again Rose", Rose yells the line in her daughter Kirsten's ear when she asks her to come close to tell her something very important.

In Saturday Night, which recounts the night of production on Saturday Night Live's premiere episode, the line is said by Chevy Chase (portrayed in the film by Cory Michael Smith) following the ending of the first episode's cold open.
