= Saturday Night Live (disambiguation) =

Saturday Night Live is an American late-night live television variety show.

Saturday Night Live may also refer to:

== Adaptations of the American television show ==
- Saturday Night Live Japan, a Japanese-language adaptation aired 2012
- Saturday Night Live Korea, a South Korean adaptation on channel tvN
- Saturday Night Live from Milano, an Italian adaptation aired 2006–2011
- Saturday Night Live (Spanish TV series), a Spanish-language adaptation aired 2009
- Le Saturday Night Live, a French adaptation on the channel M6
- SNL Québec, a French-language Canadian adaptation aired 2014–2015
- Saturday Night Live UK, a British adaptation on Sky

== Other uses ==
- Saturday Night Live with Howard Cosell, a comedy-variety program on the channel ABC aired 1975–76
- Saturday Night Live (album), by Trouble Funk, 1983
- Saturday Night Live (British TV series), a spin-off of Big Brother
- Saturday Night Live, a successor of Australian show The Penthouse Club

== See also ==
- SNL (disambiguation)
- Saturday Live (British TV programme), aired 1985–1988 and 1996
- List of Saturday Night Live cast members
- List of Saturday Night Live writers
- List of Saturday Night Live guests
- List of Saturday Night Live episodes
- List of Saturday Night Live incidents
- List of Saturday Night Live home video releases
- List of Saturday Night Live feature films
- List of awards and nominations received by Saturday Night Live
- Saturday Night Live in the 2000s, a documentary
- Saturday Night Live Weekend Update Thursday
- SNL Studios, a former production company
- Saturday Night Live Band
- SNL Digital Short, one in a series of video shorts created for Saturday Night Live.
