= SNL (disambiguation) =

SNL often refers to Saturday Night Live, an American late-night live television variety show.

SNL may also refer to:

== Businesses and organizations ==
- Sandia National Laboratories, an American research and development laboratory
- Scots National League, a 1920s political organization in Scotland
- Società Navigazione del Lago di Lugano, a Swiss boat transport company
- SNL Financial, a financial data company, now part of S&P Global

== Sport ==
- Scottish National League (ice hockey), an ice hockey league
- Slovenian First Football League (Slovene: Prva Slovenska Nogometna Liga) (1. SNL)
  - Slovenian Second Football League (Slovene: 2. Slovenska Nogometna Liga) (2. SNL
- Samoa National League, top division association football league in Samoa
- Sportvereniging Nationaal Leger, a Surinamese football team

== Other ==
- Shawnee Regional Airport (IATA code SNL), an airport in Oklahoma, US
- SnL, Shanell Lynn Woodgett (born 1980), American singer and songwriter
- Standard Nomenclature List, a U.S. Army logistical coding system
- Store norske leksikon, a Norwegian encyclopedia
- Sunday Noontime Live!, a Philippine music variety show

== See also ==
- S&L (disambiguation)
- Saturday Night Live (disambiguation)
