= Sanma Akashiya =

Japanese comedian

- 明石家 さんま
- Born: Takafumi Sugimoto (杉本 髙文); July 1, 1955 (age 71); Koza, Wakayama, Japan
- Employer: Yoshimoto Kogyo
- Spouse: Shinobu Otake (m. 1988; div. 1992)
- Children: Imalu

Comedy career
- Years active: 1974–present
- Medium: Television
- Genre: Owarai
- Hometown: Nara, Nara Prefecture

Signature
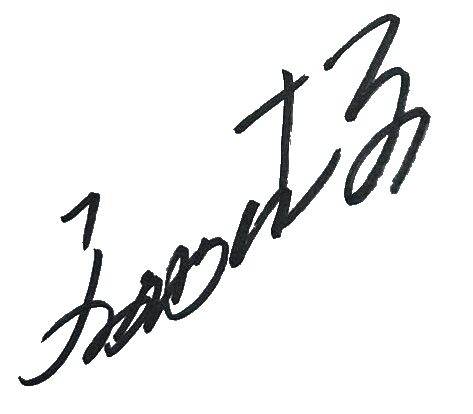

Notes
- Same year/generation as: Shinsuke Shimada; Tsutomu Sekine; All Hanshin-Kyojin

Sanma Akashiya (明石家 さんま, Akashiya Sanma; born July 1, 1955) is a Japanese comedian, TV presenter, radio personality and actor most commonly known as Sanma-san. His real name is Takafumi Sugimoto (杉本 髙文, Sugimoto Takafumi). His talent agency is Yoshimoto Kogyo and his shishô (master) back when he studied rakugo is Shōfukutei Matsunosuke.

Together with Beat Takeshi and Tamori, Sanma is said to be one of the "Big Three" television comedians of Japan. He is known for his ability to endlessly carry a conversation. His protruding front teeth are often ridiculed, even by himself.

Akashiya married actress Shinobu Otake in September 1988. They met on the set of the drama series Danjo Shichinin Natsumonogatari. At the time, Otake had one son from her previous marriage with her husband who had died. The marriage lasted 4 years as they divorced in September 1992. The two remained friends after and are sometimes seen on variety television programs together. They have one daughter, Imalu Otake, born in 1989. Imalu went on to become a tarento in 2009 under the name IMALU.

== Current TV programs ==
=== Present ===
- Odoru! Sanma Goten!! (踊る!さんま御殿!!) (Nippon TV) (1997–Present)
- Tūkai! Akashiya TV (痛快!明石家電視台) (MBS TV) (1990–Present)
- Honmadekka!? TV (ホンマでっか!?TV) (Fuji TV) (2009–Present)
- Sanma Improvement Committee (さんまのお笑い向上委員会) (Fuji TV) (2015–Present)

=== Specials ===
- Shin jijitsu! Orinpikku-mei bamen saikyō-kin medal award (as guest) (NTV, July 22, 2024)

== Past TV programs ==
=== MC/Regular ===
==== Nippon TV ====
- Yasukiyo no Odedameshi Undameshi (やすきよの腕だめし運だめし)) (Yomiuri TV) (1981 - 1982)
- Me-kata de Dōn! (目方でドーン!)) (1982 - 1983)
- Sanma-Kazuki no Itchokami de Yansu (さんま・一機のイッチョカミでやんす)) (1989 - 1990)
- Koi no Karasawagi (恋のから騒ぎ, (Much Ado About Love)) (1994 - 2011)
- Akashiya Shuppan (明石家出版)) (1997)

==== TBS TV ====
- Young Oh! Oh! (ヤングおー!おー!) (MBS TV) (1980-1982)
- Nessen! Kayō Derby (熱戦!歌謡ダービー) (1981)
- Asobi Sugi Janaino!? (遊びすぎじゃないの!?) (1985)
- Akashiya Takokusekigun (明石家多国籍軍) (MBS TV) (1994)
- Okashiya? Sanma! (おかしや?さんま!) (2003)
- Akashiya-san Channel (明石家さんちゃんねる) (2006-2008)
- Sanma-no Karakuri TV (さんまのからくりTV) (1992 - 1996)
- Sanma-no Super Karakuri TV (さんまのSUPERからくりTV) (1996 - 2014)

==== TV Asahi ====
- Do-Up Kayo TV (Do-Up歌謡テレビ) (1984 - 1985)
- Sanma no Hit Match (さんまのヒットマッチ) (1985)
- Sanma no Chūzai-san (さんまの駐在さん) (ABC TV) (1985 - 1986)
- Sanma no Gomenne Wagamamade (さんまのゴメンねわがままで) (1986)
- Sanma no Nandemo Derby (さんまのナンでもダービー) (1993 - 1995)
- Akashiya Cream Land (明石家くりぃむランド) (ABC TV) (2006)

==== TV Tokyo ====
- Saturday Night Show (サタデーナイトショー) (1981 - 1984)
- Omoshiro Purenūn (おもしろプレヌーン) (1984)

==== Fuji TV ====
- Dare ga Kabayanen Rock and Roll Show (誰がカバやねんロックンロールショー) (Kansai TV) (1979 - 1980)
- Waratteru Baai Desuyo! (笑ってる場合ですよ!) (1980 - 1982)
- Quiz Manzai Grand Prix (クイズ漫才グランプリ) (1981)
- Oretachi Hyoukinzoku (オレたちひょうきん族) (1981 - 1989)
- Shinryū-Sanma no Scoop Itchokusen (紳竜・さんまのスクープ一直線) (Kansai TV) (1983)
- Quiz! Okane ga Daisuki (クイズ!お金が大好き) (1984)
- Waratte Iitomo! (森田一義アワー 笑っていいとも!, (It's Okay to Laugh!)) (1984 - 1995, as Friday regular member)
- TV-kun, Domo! (テレビくん、どうも!) (1985 - 1988, with real name, Takafumi Sugimoto)
- Sanma no Manma (さんまのまんま) (Kansai TV) (1985 - 2016)
- "Appare Sanma" Series (「あっぱれさんま」シリーズ) (1988 - 2009)
  - Appare Sanma Daisensei (あっぱれさんま大先生)
  - Yappari Sanma Daisensei (やっぱりさんま大先生)
  - Sanma Daisensei ga iku! (さんま大先生が行く!)
  - Appare!! Sanma Daikyōju (あっぱれ!!さんま大教授)
  - Appare!! Sanma Shinkyōju (あっぱれ!!さんま新教授)
- Fujisankei Group Kokoku Taishou (フジサンケイグループ広告大賞) (1991 - 2011)
- Professional Baseball News (プロ野球ニュース) (1992 - 1993)
- Akashiya Sanma no Sports Suruzo! Daihōsō (明石家さんまのスポーツするぞ!大放送) (1993 - 1997)
- Sanma no Hiro Bar (さんまnoひろバァー) (1995)
- Nama Sanma Minna de Iikimochi (生さんま みんなでイイ気持ち!) (1995)
- Takeshi-Sanma no Yūmeijin no Atsumarumise (たけし・さんまの有名人の集まる店) (1997 - 1999)
- Akashiya Mansion Monogatari (明石家マンション物語) (1999 - 2001)
- Sanma no Tengoku to Jigoku (さんまの天国と地獄) (2000 - 2002)
- Akashiya Ukennen Monogatari (明石家ウケんねん物語) (2001 - 2002)
- Odaiba Akashijō (お台場明石城) (2004 - 2006)
- Saturday Night Live Japan (サタデー・ナイト・ライブ JPN) (2011, 2012 (Satellite TV))

== TV series ==
- Seven Men and Women, Summer Story (男女7人夏物語) (TBS, 1986)
- Seven Men and Women, Autumn Story (男女7人秋物語) (TBS, 1987)
- Furuhata Ninzaburō (Fuji TV, 1996), Oshimizu
- Hatachi no Koibito (ハタチの恋人) (TBS, 2007)
- Jimmy: The True Story of a True Idiot (Netflix, 2018), himself

== Film ==
- Tokyo Taxi (2025), Sada (voice)

== Radio ==
- MBS Young Town Doyōbi (MBSヤングタウン 土曜日) (MBS Radio, with Haruna Iikubo and Haruka Kudo)
