= Mr. Bill's Real Life Adventures =

- Directed by: Jim Drake
- Written by: Mel Sherer; Steve Granat
- Based on: Mr. Bill by Walter Williams
- Produced by: Fred Fuchs
- Starring: Peter Scolari; Valerie Mahaffey; Lenore Kasdorf; Michael McManus
- Distributed by: Showtime Networks
- Release date: September 11, 1986
- Running time: 43 minutes
- Country: United States
- Language: English

Mr. Bill's Real Life Adventures is a short 1986 comedy television film written by Mel Sherer and Steve Granat, directed by Jim Drake, and based on characters created by Walter Williams (whose Super-8 films were the inspiration for the Mr. Bill sketches from the television show Saturday Night Live). Mr. Bill's Real Life Adventures premiered on the Showtime cable television network in the United States on September 11, 1986.

== Plot ==
The Mr. Bill claymation shorts from Saturday Night Live are reimagined in a live-action format, featuring Mr. Bill, his wife Mrs. Bill, and their son Billy, as well as his next-door neighbor, Sluggo, his wife Mrs. Sluggo, and their daughter Junior. Although ostensibly human and not clay in the reimagining, the Bill family is shown to be a family of smaller-sized people.

Many of the film's jokes involve the characters' small size, the challenges they have living in a large human world, and various scenarios where Mr. Bill is subjected to abusive situations, (although Sluggo's abusiveness was toned-down from the original Saturday Night Live character's, for this somewhat more family-friendly foray).

== Cast ==
- Peter Scolari as Mr. Bill
- Valerie Mahaffey as Mrs. Bill
- Lenore Kasdorf as Mrs. Sluggo
- Christopher Burton as Billy
- Hope Tibbetts as Junior
- Michael McManus as Sluggo
- Shelley Duvall as Herself
