= Mr. Bill =

Fictional Saturday Night Live character created by Walter Williams

Mr. Bill is a clay figurine star of a parody of children's entertainment created by New Orleans native Walter Williams in 1975. The Mr. Bill showing got its start on Saturday Night Live as a series of Super 8 films sent in response to the show's request for home movies during the first season. Mr. Bill's first appearance occurred on the February 28, 1976 episode. After five submitted films, Williams became a full-time writer for the show in 1978 and wrote more than 20 sketches based on Mr. Bill. Each Mr. Bill episode started innocently but quickly turned dangerous for Mr. Bill and his dog Spot. He would suffer various indignities inflicted by "Mr. Hands", a man seen only as a pair of hands (originally performed by Vance DeGeneres). Sometimes the abuse came from Sluggo, another clay character, which Mr. Hands usually jokingly brands as one of Mr. Bill's "best friends". A running gag in the sketches is whenever Sluggo would make his appearance, Mr. Bill would get worried and say, "He's gonna be mean to me!", to which Mr. Hands often gives him reassurance by responding with, "No!". The violence inevitably escalated, generally ending with Mr. Bill being crushed or dismembered while squealing "Ohhhh noooooooooooooo!" in a falsetto voice.

The concept for Mr. Hands came from Williams' observation that children's cartoons in the 1970s were so static, he expected the artist's hands to enter the screen at any moment and physically start moving the drawings around.

Initial Saturday Night Live sketches featuring Mr. Bill were self-contained episodes with no direct continuity, with the earliest installments featuring higher-pitched character voices. After Walter Williams joined SNL's writing staff in 1978, Mr. Bill formally moved to New York at the start of the season. Later sketches saw Mr. Bill become aware of Mr. Hands and Sluggo's mistreatment, with the 1979–80 season harboring an extended story arc where Mr. Bill lost his home, sought psychiatric help, attempted to get Mr. Hands and Sluggo arrested, and was ultimately thrown into prison.

Williams left Saturday Night Live after that season, but Mr. Bill returned for a Christmas short film in December 1980, as well as the sixth-season finale, where guest Chevy Chase found Mr. Bill in a garbage can. The last Mr. Bill sketch on SNL aired early in the 1981–1982 season, where Mr. Bill moved to Los Angeles. After SNL, Mr. Bill has appeared on numerous other television programs and advertisements, including regular new sketches on the USA Network series Night Flight in the 1980s and the Fox Family Channel series Ohh Nooo! Mr. Bill Presents in the 1990s.

== Characters ==
- Mr. Bill – The star of the show. His catchphrase is "Ooh nooooo!"
- Spot – Mr. Bill's dog, who dies in most episodes.
- Sluggo – The main villain.
- Mr. Hands – A pair of human hands (originally played by Vance DeGeneres), which subject Mr. Bill to abuse, often at Sluggo's prompting. Mr. Hands also serves as the narrator of the show.
- Miss Sally – Mr. Bill's girlfriend, introduced in October 1979.
- Mr. Bill's Mom – Introduced in January 1979, primarily seen in flashbacks.
- Billy – Mr. Bill and Miss Sally's son, who appears in some post-SNL shorts.
- Sluggo clones – duplicates of Sluggo, often seen in crowd shots.

== List of SNL episodes featured ==
1. February 28, 1976 (The Mr. Bill Holiday Special)
2. October 16, 1976 (Mr. Bill Goes To A Party)
3. January 22, 1977 (Mr. Bill Goes To A Magic Show)
4. March 25, 1978 (Mr. Bill Goes To The Circus)
5. April 8, 1978 (Mr. Bill Pays His Taxes)
6. October 14, 1978 (Mr. Bill Goes To New York)
7. October 21, 1978 (Mr. Bill Moves In)
8. November 18, 1978 (Mr. Bill Goes Fishing)
9. December 2, 1978 (Mr. Bill Is Late)
10. January 27, 1979 (Mr. Bill Goes To Court)
11. February 24, 1979 (Mr. Bill Shapes Up)
12. March 17, 1979 (Mr. Bill Is Hiding)
13. May 12, 1979 (Mr. Bill Runs Away)
14. May 19, 1979 (Mr. Bill Goes To The Movies)
15. May 26, 1979 (Mr. Bill Visits Saturday Night Live; cold open)
16. October 13, 1979 (The All-New Mr. Bill Show)
17. November 3, 1979 (Mr. Bill Stays Home)
18. November 17, 1979 (Mr. Bill Builds A House)
19. January 26, 1980 (Mr. Bill Gets Help)
20. April 5, 1980 (Mr. Bill Strikes Back)
21. May 10, 1980 (Mr. Bill Gets 20 Years In Sing Sing)
22. December 20, 1980 (Mr. Bill's Christmas Special)
23. April 11, 1981 (cold open with Chevy Chase)
24. October 17, 1981 (Mr. Bill Goes To L.A.; final appearance)

== Film and physical media ==
Video Tape Network, an early home video label derived from a college entertainment provider founded by John Lollos, released a 27 minute compilation of Mr. Bill shorts on VHS and Beta in 1979. The shorts included in the compilation were "Mr. Bill Goes To The Circus", "Mr. Bill Goes To New York", "Mr. Bill Moves In", "Mr. Bill Visits Saturday Night Live" (minus a John Belushi cameo that had appeared in the broadcast version), "Mr. Bill Goes Fishing", "Mr. Bill Goes To Court", "Mr. Bill Goes To The Movies", "Mr. Bill Shapes Up", “Jack’s Tall Stout and Deformed Men's Wear Shop” (a non-Mr. Bill live-action comedy short by Williams that involved body deformity gags similar to those suffered by Mr. Bill), "Mr. Bill Is Late", "Mr. Bill Is Hiding", and "Mr. Bill Runs Away". It was the label's most successful release.

For the 1979 theatrical release of Michael O'Donoghue's unaired NBC television special Mr. Mike's Mondo Video, Williams created a 20 minute short, “Get Well Soon, Mr. Bill”, combining footage from previous Mr. Bill shorts with new wraparound scenes, to present at the head of the film to pad out the program to feature length.

In 1983, Pacific Arts, a home video label founded by Michael Nesmith, in association with Broadway video, released another compilation, Mr. Bill Looks Back, which packaged shorts made after the ones assembled in the previous Video Tape Network compilation, including "Mr. Bill Stays Home", "Mr. Bill Builds a House", "Mr. Bill Gets Help", "Mr. Bill Goes to the Beach", "Mr. Bill Strikes Back!", "Mr. Bill Goes to Jail", along with newly-created material as "Mr. Bill Goes Tubing."

In 1993, Starmaker Entertainment, in collaboration with NBC and Broadway Video, released a new video collection, The Best of Saturday Night Live: The Mr. Bill Collection, effectively combining almost all the shorts from both the 1979 and 1983 compilations.

The character's popularity spawned the 1986 live-action Showtime television film Mr. Bill's Real Life Adventures, with Peter Scolari as Mr. Bill.

A new Mr. Bill short film entitled Mr. Bill Goes To Washington premiered in theaters in 1993, preceding the movie Ernest Rides Again. The short, which sees Mr. Bill elected as President of the United States, was also featured on the Ernest Rides Again home video release.

Two new Mr. Bill home videos were released in the mid-1990s featuring new content, including 1996's "Ohh Nooo!!! It's Mr. Bill's 20th Anniversary", and 1997 straight-to-video Ho Ho Noooooo!!! It's Mr. Bill's Christmas Special!, the latter featuring a guest appearance by former SNL contributor Don Novello as Father Guido Sarducci.

== See also ==
- The Pizza Head Show
- List of recurring Saturday Night Live characters and sketches
