= Jim Drake (director) =

American film and television director (1944–2022)

- Born: James Richard Drake; December 2, 1944; United States
- Died: January 10, 2022 (aged 77); Freeland, Washington, U.S.
- Other name: James R. Drake
- Occupations: Film director, television director
- Years active: 1974–2012
- Spouse: Brigit Drake
- Children: 2

James Richard Drake (December 2, 1944 – January 10, 2022) was an American film and television director.

== Life and career ==
Drake's career began in 1974, working as an associate director for the Norman Lear-produced sitcoms All in the Family and Good Times; he made his lead directorial debut in the syndicated comedy/soap opera spoof series Mary Hartman, Mary Hartman, which was executive produced by Lear. His other television works include Sanford, Gimme a Break!, We Got It Made, The Facts of Life, Newhart, Night Court, The Golden Girls, Dave's World, The Suite Life of Zack & Cody, its spin-off, The Suite Life on Deck, and other series.

His film credits include Mr. Bill's Real Life Adventures, Police Academy 4: Citizens on Patrol and Speed Zone starring John Candy.

Drake was an alumnus of Columbia University and Stanford University. He died in Freeland, Washington, on January 10, 2022, at the age of 77.
