= S&L =

S&L can refer to:

- Savings and loan association, a kind of financial institution
  - Savings and loan crisis, a financial crisis of Savings and Loan Association failures
- Strength & Loyalty, an album by Bone Thugs-n-Harmony
- Snakes and Ladders

== See also ==
- SNL (disambiguation)
