= Saturday Night Live Japan =

Japanese late-night television program

- Also known as: Saturday Night Live JPN
- Country of origin: Japan
- Original language: Japanese
- No. of seasons: 1
- No. of episodes: 6 (Fuji TV); 3 (Fuji TV Next)

Production
- Production locations: Tokyo, Japan
- Running time: 45 mins.
- Production company: Fuji Television

Original release
- Network: FNS (Fuji TV)
- Release: October 27 – November 17, 2012

Saturday Night Live Japan (サタデー・ナイト・ライブ JPN) was a Japanese late-night live television sketch comedy and variety television program broadcast that aired on Fuji TV and its affiliates and the pay television channel Fuji TV Next. It was an adaptation of Saturday Night Live on NBC that relies more on the konto style of comedy.

== Format ==
The show has two main hosts, Koji Imada and Sanma Akashiya, and is aired monthly every first week rather than weekly. The show still contains the same format of having a guest star appear on the show along with a guest singer or band performing at the end.
