= Le Saturday Night Live =

French late-night live television comedy show

- Country of origin: France
- Original language: French
- No. of seasons: 1
- No. of episodes: 1

Production
- Production locations: Paris, France

Original release
- Network: M6
- Release: January 5, 2017

Le Saturday Night Live is a French late-night live television comedy show, an adaptation of the American show Saturday Night Live. It is produced by the channel M6 and first broadcast on 5 January 2017.

The format mirrors that of Saturday Night Live, featuring an opening monologue, live and recorded sketches, and musical performances. Unlike its American counterpart, Le Saturday Night Live is not broadcast weekly, but is to be limited to three to four shows per year. The pilot episode attracted 3.8 million viewers and was hosted by the comedian and actor Gad Elmaleh; other performers included Jamel Debbouze, Malik Bentalha and Gérard Darmon.

Reviewing the first episode, Le Monde called it a "perfectible success", generating more laughter than any other French comedy show despite performances of varying quality. Le Point, on the other hand, criticized the show as "badly written and not always well acted (...) sometimes pleasing, often annoying", noting that it lacked the professional team working full-time on the American show.
