= Saturday Night Live =

American sketch comedy television series

- Logo used as of September 28, 2024
- Also known as: NBC's Saturday Night (1975–1977); Saturday Night Live '80 (1980)
- Genre: Political satire; Sketch comedy; Stand-up comedy; Variety show
- Created by: Lorne Michaels
- Written by: List of Saturday Night Live writers
- Directed by: Dave Wilson (1975–1986; 1989–1995); Paul Miller (1986–1989); Beth McCarthy-Miller (1995–2006); Don Roy King (2006–2021); Liz Patrick (2021–present)
- Starring: List of Saturday Night Live cast members
- Announcer: Don Pardo; Mel Brandt; Bill Hanrahan; Darrell Hammond
- Theme music composer: Howard Shore (except for season 6)
- Country of origin: United States
- Original language: English
- No. of seasons: 52
- No. of episodes: 1,014 (list of episodes)

Production
- Executive producers: Lorne Michaels (1975–1980; 1985–present); Jean Doumanian (1980–1981); Dick Ebersol (1981–1985)
- Production locations: Studio 8H, NBC Studios, New York City
- Running time: 60–70 minutes (without commercials)
- Production company: Broadway Video (1981–present); SNL Studios (1999–present); Other studios: NBC (1975–1982); NBC Productions (1982–1996); NBC Studios (1996–2004); NBC Universal Television Studio (2004–2007); Universal Media Studios (2007–2011); Universal Television (2011–present)

Original release
- Network: NBC (1975–present); Peacock (2021–present)
- Release: October 11, 1975 – present

Related
- TV Funhouse; Saturday Night Live Weekend Update Thursday; Saturday Night Live UK; Saturday Night Live Korea

Saturday Night Live (SNL) is an American late-night live sketch comedy variety show created by Lorne Michaels and developed by Michaels and Dick Ebersol that airs on NBC and streams next day (along with a full catalogue) on Peacock. The show's premiere was hosted by George Carlin on NBC on October 11, 1975, under the original title NBC's Saturday Night. The show's comedy sketches are performed by a large and varying cast of repertory and newer “featured” cast members. Each episode is hosted by a celebrity guest, has a musical guest, and is broadcast live with a studio audience.

The host usually delivers a comedic monologue toward the start of the show and then performs in sketches with the cast, and introduces featured performances by a musical guest. An episode normally begins with a cold open sketch that is usually based on current political or pop cultural events and ends with someone breaking character and proclaiming, "Live from New York, it's Saturday Night!", before moving to credits and introduction of the guest host.

In 1980, Michaels left the show to explore other opportunities. He was replaced by Jean Doumanian, who was then replaced by Ebersol after a season of poor reviews. Ebersol ran the show until 1985, when Michaels returned. Since then, Michaels has served as showrunner. Many SNL cast members have found national stardom while appearing on the show, and achieved success in film and television, both in front of and behind the camera. Others associated with the show, such as writers, have gone on to successful careers creating, writing, and starring in television and film.

SNL is broadcast from Studio 8H at NBC's headquarters in 30 Rockefeller Plaza in New York. SNL has aired 1,014 episodes since its debut, making it one of the longest-running network television programs in the United States. The show format has been developed and recreated in several countries, meeting with different levels of success. Successful sketches have seen life outside the show as feature films, including The Blues Brothers (1980), Wayne's World (1992) and A Night at the Roxbury (1998). The show has been marketed in other ways, including home media releases of "best of" and whole seasons, and books and documentaries about behind-the-scenes activities of running and developing the show.

Throughout five decades on air, Saturday Night Live has received a vast number of awards, including 84 Primetime Emmy Awards, 6 Writers Guild of America Awards, and 3 Peabody Awards. In 2000, it was inducted into the National Association of Broadcasters Hall of Fame. It was ranked tenth in TV Guide's "50 Greatest TV Shows of All Time" list, and in 2007 it was listed as one of Time's "100 Best TV Shows of All-TIME". As of 2022, the show had received more than 305 Primetime Emmy Award nominations, the most received by any television program.

== History ==
=== Development: 1974–1975 ===
Beginning in 1965, NBC network affiliates broadcast reruns of The Tonight Show Starring Johnny Carson on Saturday or Sunday nights. In 1974, Johnny Carson petitioned to NBC executives for the weekend shows to be pulled and saved so they could be aired during weeknights, allowing him to take time off. In response, NBC president Herbert Schlosser approached the vice president of late-night programming, Dick Ebersol, and asked him to create a show to fill the Saturday night time slot. Schlosser and Ebersol then approached Lorne Michaels. Over the next three weeks, Ebersol and Michaels developed the latter's idea for a variety show featuring high-concept comedy sketches, political satire, and music performances that would attract 18- to 34-year-old viewers. NBC decided to base the new show at their studios in 30 Rockefeller Center. Michaels was given Studio 8H, a converted radio studio that was home to NBC's election and Apollo moon landing coverage. It was revamped for the premiere at a cost of $250,000 ($1,649,350.91 in 2025).

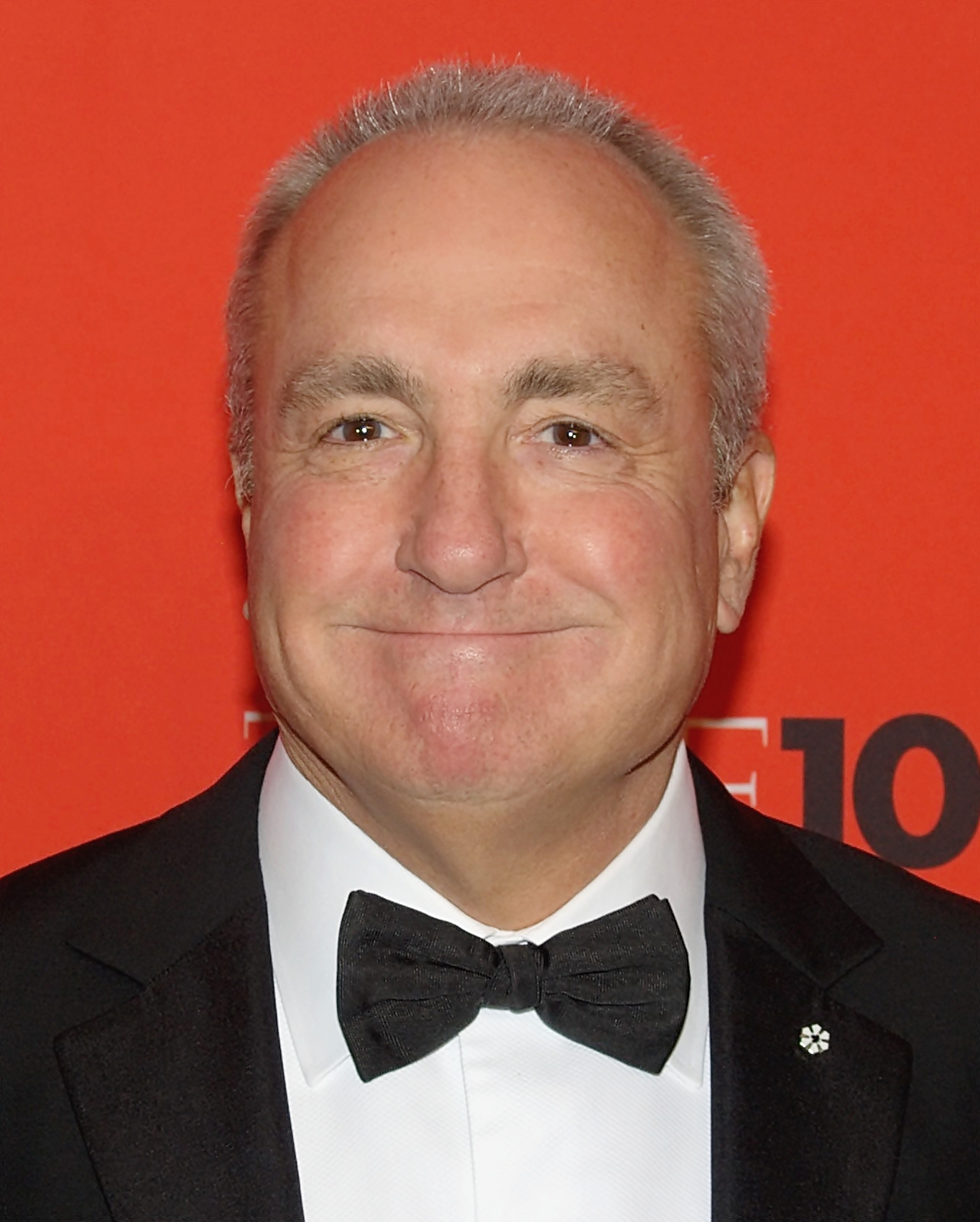
Showrunner Lorne Michaels in 2010

By 1975, Michaels had assembled the show's initial cast, including Dan Aykroyd, John Belushi, Chevy Chase, Jane Curtin, Garrett Morris, Laraine Newman, Gilda Radner, and George Coe. The cast was nicknamed the "Not Ready for Prime-Time Players", a term coined by show writer Herb Sargent. Much of the talent pool involved in the inaugural season was recruited from The National Lampoon Radio Hour, including the original head writer, Michael O'Donoghue.

=== 1970s ===
NBC's Saturday Night debuted on October 11, 1975, with an episode featuring George Carlin as host. The original title was used because the Saturday Night Live title was in use by Saturday Night Live with Howard Cosell on rival network ABC. After the cancellation of Cosell's show in 1976, NBC purchased the rights to the name and officially changed the show's title to Saturday Night Live at the start of the 1977–1978 season, its third. The cast was initially paid $750 per episode, and essentially lived at the offices, according to Michaels. The show found its footing by the fourth episode, hosted by Candice Bergen, which had featured the cast in most segments. The show developed a cult following, and its humor was seen as refreshing and daring, in comparison to previous sketch and variety shows that would rarely deal with controversial topics and issues. Iconic characters during the show's first five seasons included Belushi's samurai, the Coneheads (Aykroyd, Curtin, Newman), and Radner's Roseanne Roseannadanna. Chase, the show's first breakout star, left in the middle of its second season to pursue a movie career — the first of many cast members to do so — and was replaced by Bill Murray.

Drugs were a major problem during the show's first five years, which exacerbated existing tensions. Cocaine had become an "integral part of the working process" on SNL by the 1978–1979 season, according to Doug Hill and Jeff Weingrad. Aykroyd and Belushi left the show after the 1978–1979 season to make The Blues Brothers, and as the fifth season ended in 1980, Michaels asked executives to place the show on hiatus for a year in order to allow him time to pursue other projects. Michaels suggested writers Al Franken, Tom Davis, and Jim Downey as his replacements; NBC president Fred Silverman disliked Franken and was infuriated by his Update routine in May 1980, called "A Limo for a Lame-O", that had critiqued Silverman's job performance. Unable to secure the deal that he wanted, Michaels chose to leave NBC, and Jean Doumanian was given his position. Almost every writer and cast member, including Michaels, left the show after the May 24, 1980, season finale.

=== 1980s ===
Doumanian's rapidly-assembled new cast faced immediate comparisons to the previous cast, and was not received favorably by critics or audiences. In a February 1981 episode, cast member Charles Rocket used the profanity "fuck" during a sketch. Rocket later said he was trying to kill time before the show's close and had not meant to utter the word. Following this episode, Doumanian was dismissed after only ten months on the job.

Although some executives suggested SNL be cancelled, the show received a reprieve, and Dick Ebersol was hired as producer. He worked quickly to revamp the show, eventually removing all of the new cast members aside from Eddie Murphy and Joe Piscopo. Ebersol's sketches leaned towards more accessible, broad comedy, which alienated some long-time fans, writers, and cast members. His distaste for political humor led the show to largely avoid jokes about President Ronald Reagan during his time as showrunner. Under Ebersol's leadership, Murphy, who had been underused during Doumanian's tenure, rose to prominence with popular characters such as Mister Robinson's Neighborhood and Gumby. His success was a major factor in the show's resurgence, though it created tensions within the cast. (Note: Nolte was booked to host the show, but had cancelled just four days before showtime. Ebersol offered Murphy the chance to host, a move that Piscopo would perceive as a major slight. Piscopo would later claim that Ebersol used Murphy's success to divide the two erstwhile friends and play them against one another. Murphy's star had exploded, and he left SNL to concentrate on his film career in early 1984.)

In a break with tradition, producers hired established comedians such as Billy Crystal and Martin Short for the 1984–1985 season. Though this season was considered one of the series' funniest, it diverged significantly from Michaels' innovative approach. Like Michaels before him, Ebersol informed NBC that he would only return if the show took a hiatus to recast and rebuild, and diverge significantly from the established live format. NBC rejected these requests and instead decided to approach Michaels to return as producer.

Michaels returned for the 1985–1986 season; the show was again recast, with Michaels borrowing Ebersol's idea to seek out established actors. Writers struggled with the cast, and Michaels cleaned house again for the 1986–1987 season, seeking unknown talent such as Dana Carvey and Phil Hartman instead of known names. This new cast was successful at reviving the show's popularity in the eyes of critics and audiences.

=== 1990s ===
In the early 1990s, much of this core cast began to leave the show, and younger performers such as Chris Farley and Adam Sandler began to be promoted to repertory status. Some of these cast members, such as Sandler, Farley, Rob Schneider, David Spade and Chris Rock, would come to be known as the "Bad Boys of SNL" for their outrageous comedy style. Afraid of cast members leaving for film careers, Michaels had overcrowded the cast, causing a divide between the veteran members and the new, younger talent. This led to increased competition for the show's limited screen time, and an increasing reliance on "younger", less subtle humor.

The show lost Carvey and Hartman, two of its biggest stars, between 1992 and 1994. Wanting to increase SNL's ratings and profitability, NBC West Coast president Don Ohlmeyer and other executives began to actively interfere in the show, recommending that new stars such as Chris Farley and Adam Sandler be fired and critiquing the costly nature of performing the show live. Criticism of the show's writing increased during this period, which reached its peak by the 1994–1995 season, which is considered one of the series' worst. A widely publicized profile of the show in New York during this period was highly critical of the show's humor, cast, and backstage dysfunction.

The show's cast was largely overhauled for the 1995–1996 season with names such as Will Ferrell and Cheri Oteri, which was successful at revitalizing the show. The show faced new competition during this period in the form of Fox's sketch comedy show Mad TV, which aired a half hour earlier than SNL and featured a more diverse cast.

=== 2000s ===
The 2000–2001 season was notable for its well-received spoofing of that year's presidential campaign between Al Gore and George W. Bush. The show's New York City cast and crew were highly affected by the September 11 attacks in 2001, and returned on September 29 with an acclaimed appearance by Rudy Giuliani. Political humor was reduced for the following seasons.

Before the start of the 2006–2007 season, the show suffered budget cuts that led to a smaller cast. The following season was also cut short by the 2007–2008 Writers Guild of America strike, which led to several cancelled episodes.

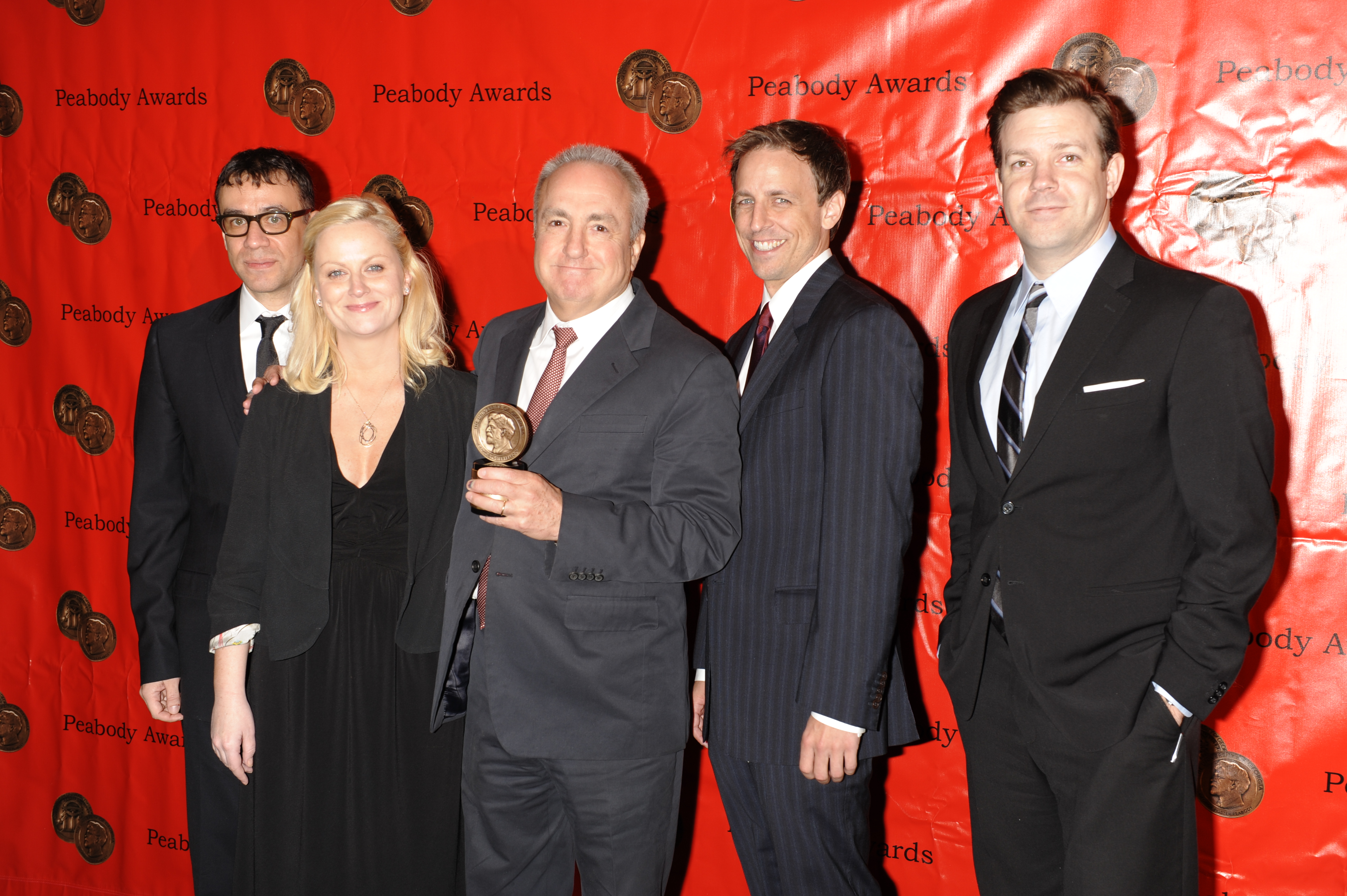
Lorne Michaels and some of the SNL cast at the 68th Annual Peabody Awards for Political Satire in 2008. From left to right: Fred Armisen, Amy Poehler, Michaels, Seth Meyers, and Jason Sudeikis.

Tina Fey, who was a cast member and head writer from 1997 to 2006, later returned to the show during the 2008 presidential election for several critically acclaimed guest appearances as vice presidential candidate Sarah Palin. Writer Robert Smigel later said it was the show's "biggest moment since the 70s", and Michaels observed that it made Fey a "huge star" and that "you could see perception changing completely". Armisen played Barack Obama from 2008 to 2012, following which cast member Jay Pharoah assumed the impression.

The show began to rely more on pre-recorded material and videos more than it ever had before during this period, to the extent that some commentators said it had sometimes outshined live material on the show. Taped material significantly increased in the mid-2000s with SNL Digital Shorts by The Lonely Island, and continued into the following years with videos by Good Neighbor and Please Don't Destroy.

=== 2010s ===
The cast continued to evolve significantly into the 2010s as several longtime cast members such as Bill Hader and Kristen Wiig left the series. The 2013–2014 season saw the hiring of seven new cast members in a significant overhaul, including Beck Bennett, Kyle Mooney, and Sasheer Zamata. Longtime head writer and cast member Seth Meyers also exited midway through that season, and was replaced by fellow writer Colin Jost in the Weekend Update segment.

The show frequently parodied Donald Trump in and around his first presidency; an ongoing impression by actor Alec Baldwin led to a significant increase in ratings and a "shot of relevance" for the show, according to Vanity Fair. Trump disliked Baldwin's impression, tweeting in 2019 that the Federal Election Commission or the Federal Communications Commission (FCC) should look into stopping SNL from "knocking the same person (me), over & over, without so much of a mention of 'the other side.'" In 2021, sources close to the Trump White House told The Daily Beast that in 2019, Trump repeatedly asked his advisers and lawyers to stop negative portrayals of him on SNL and other shows, such as Jimmy Kimmel Live!, through the interference of the FCC or the Department of Justice. In 2021, James Austin Johnson assumed the Trump impression from Baldwin.

=== 2020s ===
Due to the COVID-19 pandemic, SNL's 2019–2020 season was indefinitely halted on March 16, 2020. The season was later resumed in April with three remotely produced episodes labelled Saturday Night Live at Home, and the show returned to Studio 8H in October 2020. After the 2021–2022 season, many longtime cast members left the show in a major cast overhaul, including Aidy Bryant, Kate McKinnon, and Pete Davidson; Michaels said that the pandemic had led to some cast members staying with the show for longer than they may have otherwise.

In January 2024, Variety said that "speculation [had] been rampant for years" that Michaels would retire from the series after its fiftieth season, premiering in 2024. Michaels told Entertainment Tonight that month that former head writer and cast member Tina Fey could "easily" be his successor, were he to step down, but said he had not made a decision yet at that point. Michaels has worked with Fey several times since her SNL tenure ended, including on 30 Rock. Michaels earlier said in 2021 that the show's fiftieth anniversary would be "a really good time to leave". Kenan Thompson, the show's longest-serving cast member, speculated in 2022 that SNL may come to an end altogether after its fiftieth season, saying that it could make financial sense for NBC. However, in an interview with The Hollywood Reporter in September 2024, Michaels denied that he was retiring at the end of the season.

A three-hour prime-time live broadcast to celebrate the series' fiftieth anniversary was aired on February 16, 2025. The writers included prior writers and cast members Tina Fey, Jim Downey, Paula Pell, Seth Meyers, and John Mulaney. The show started with a musical cold open by Paul Simon and Sabrina Carpenter and the SNL Monologue by Steve Martin.

== Cast and crew ==
=== Cast ===
Those selected to join the cast of SNL are normally already accomplished performers, recruited from improvisational comedy groups such as The Groundlings (Newman, Hartman, Will Ferrell, Jon Lovitz, Kristen Wiig) and The Second City (Aykroyd, Farley, Tina Fey, Tim Meadows), or established stand-up comedians (Carvey, Sandler, Macdonald, Chris Rock), who already possess the training or experience necessary for SNL. The cast is divided into two tiers: the more established group of repertory players; and newer, unproven cast members known as featured players, who may eventually be promoted to the repertory stable. Of the many roles available in the show, one of the longest-running and most coveted is being the host of Weekend Update, a segment featuring one or two hosts, who get substantial screen time performing as themselves. Many of the Weekend Update hosts have gone on to find greater success outside the show, including Dennis Miller, Seth Meyers, Norm Macdonald, Colin Quinn, and Jimmy Fallon.

The original 1975 cast, from left to right: Laraine Newman, John Belushi, Jane Curtin, Gilda Radner, Dan Aykroyd, Garrett Morris, and Chevy Chase

As of Season 52, SNL has featured 174 cast members including, besides the above-mentioned players, Rachel Dratch, Amy Poehler, David Spade, Will Forte, Julia Louis-Dreyfus, Tracy Morgan, Chris Parnell, Maya Rudolph, Andy Samberg, Molly Shannon, and many others. Kenan Thompson is the show's longest-serving cast member. For the 2026–2027 season, the cast consists of 17 members, with 10 repertory players and 7 featured players:

2026–27 season cast
Repertory players	Featured players
Michael Che (joined 2014)^{‡}; Mikey Day (joined 2016); Andrew Dismukes (joined 2020); Marcello Hernández (joined 2022); James Austin Johnson (joined 2021); Colin Jost (joined 2014)^{‡}; Ashley Padilla (joined 2024); Sarah Sherman (joined 2021); Kenan Thompson (joined 2003); Jane Wickline (joined 2024)	Saidah Belo-Osagie (joined 2026); Tommy Brennan (joined 2025); Jeremy Culhane (joined 2025); Ben Marshall (joined 2025); Kam Patterson (joined 2025); Grace Reiter (joined 2026); Veronika Slowikowska (joined 2025)
^{‡} denotes Weekend Update anchor

=== Contracts and salaries ===
The cast were often contracted from anywhere between five and six years to the show, but starting with the 1999–2000 season, new hires were tied to a rewritten contract that allowed NBC to take a cast member in at least their second year and put them in an NBC sitcom. Cast members are given the option of rejecting the first two sitcom offers but must accept the third offer, with the sitcom contract length dictated by NBC and potentially lasting up to six years. The move drew criticism from talent agents and managers who believed a cast member could be locked into a contract with NBC for twelve years—six on SNL and then six on a sitcom. The contract also optioned the cast member for three feature films produced by SNL Films, a company owned by NBC, Paramount Pictures, and Michaels. The new contracts were reportedly developed after many previously unknown cast members, such as Mike Myers and Adam Sandler, gained fame on SNL only to leave and make money for other studios. In a 2010 interview, Wiig was reported to be contracted to SNL for a total of seven years. The contracts also contain a network option that allows NBC to remove a cast member at any time. In the first season of the show the cast was paid $750 per episode, rising to $2,000 by season two, and $4,000 by season four. By the late 1990s, new cast members received a salary between $5,000 and $5,500 per episode, increasing to $6,000 in the second year and up to $12,500 for a cast member in their fifth year. Performers could earn an additional $1,500 per episode for writing a sketch that made it to air. In 2001, Ferrell became the highest-paid cast member, being paid $350,000 per season (approximately $17,500 per episode). According to cast member Pete Davidson, his starting salary in 2014 was approximately $3,000 per episode.

=== Writers ===
As of the 2022–23 season, Kent Sublette, Alison Gates, and Streeter Seidell are the show's co-head writers.

Seth Meyers became a co-head writer in the 2005–06 season, became the single head writer from 2008 to 2012, and then left in 2014. Current Update anchor Colin Jost has himself been a writer since 2005 and was one of the head writers from 2012 to 2015 before being renamed head writer, from 2017 until 2022. Current Update co-anchor Michael Che has been a writer since 2013. He temporarily left the show in the summer of 2014, but came back that fall to anchor Update and reclaimed his status as a writer, then serving as a co-head writer alongside Jost for five years. The Weekend Update segment has its own dedicated team of writers led by head writer Pete Schultz (who has been writing for the segment since 2011; and has been the segment's head writer since 2014).

The segment's previous head writer was Alex Baze (who wrote for the segment from 2004 to 2014, and was the head writer of the segment starting with the 2011–12 season, until his aforementioned 2014 departure). Scenes on Weekend Update that involve members of the cast acting in-character alongside the host are often written by staff writers outside the dedicated Weekend Update team, who know those characters better.

SNL writers are often also performers or experienced in writing and improvisational comedy. Many are hired from similar backgrounds such as The Groundlings, Second City, Upright Citizens Brigade Theatre, and ImprovOlympic. Comedian Jim Downey was head writer for 10 years, from 1985 to 1995. Downey (who previously joined the show's writing staff in the show's second season in 1977) is not only the show's longest-tenured head writer, but also overall the show's longest-tenured writer in the show's history – he wrote for the show on-and-off for 30 years, formally retiring from the show in 2013.

Experienced writers with backgrounds in television shows are also sometimes brought into the SNL writing room. Like the SNL cast who appear on camera, many of the writers have been able to find their own success outside the show, such as Conan O'Brien, who was brought into SNL from The Groundlings in 1988, went on to write for The Simpsons, and eventually began hosting his own show. Former head writer Adam McKay, along with performer Ferrell, founded the successful comedy website Funny or Die. In 1999, Tina Fey (a year before joining the cast and becoming a Weekend Update anchor) became the first woman SNL head writer and successfully made the transition to starring on the show, as well as writing and starring in feature films, ultimately creating and starring in her own show 30 Rock, which was partly based on her SNL experiences. In 2005 Fey was paid $1.5 million per season for her dual role as head writer and performer. Writer John Mulaney has also found success outside of SNL through well-received stand-up specials, his Broadway act The Oh, Hello Show, and the special John Mulaney & the Sack Lunch Bunch.

=== Directors ===
The show employs a studio director, who directs all of the live sketches, as well as segment directors, who direct the commercial parodies and short films.

The show's studio directors have been:

- Dave Wilson (1975–1986)
- Paul Miller (1986–1989)
- Dave Wilson (1989–1995)
- Beth McCarthy Miller (1995–2006)
- Don Roy King (2006–2021)
- Liz Patrick (2021–present)

The show's current in-house segment directors are:

- Mike Diva (2021–present)
- Tim Wilkime (2022–present)
- Christopher Werner (2023–present)

=== Announcers ===
Don Pardo served as the announcer for the series when it began and continued in the role for all but season seven, between 1981 and 1982, when Michaels had left and Mel Brandt and Bill Hanrahan filled the announcing role. In 2004 Pardo announced that he would step down from his position, but then continued in the role until 2009 when he again announced his retirement, but then continued into the 2009–10 season.

In 2010, the 92-year-old Pardo was reported to be again considering his retirement, but continued to serve as announcer until his death at age 96 on August 18, 2014, following the 39th season. Apart from a brief period in 2006 in which Pardo pre-recorded his announcements at his home in Arizona, he flew to New York City to perform his announcing duties live, until 2010 when he began recording permanently from Arizona. Former cast members Joe Piscopo and Darrell Hammond have also impersonated Pardo and fulfilled his announcing duties during times Pardo was unavailable. Hammond took over as full-time announcer starting with season 40.

=== Hosts and musical guests ===
A typical episode of SNL will feature a single host chosen for their popularity or novelty, or because they have a film, album, or other work being released near the time of their appearance on the show. The host delivers the opening monologue and goodnights, introduces the musical guest, and performs in sketches with the cast. Traditionally, the host of the show ends the opening monologue by mentioning the musical guest for the night and saying, "We got a great show for you tonight, (musical guest) is/are here/I'm here (if the host is also the musical guest). So stick around, we'll be right back."

Comedian George Carlin was the first to host SNL in the debut October 1975 episode; three episodes later, Candice Bergen became the first woman to host and subsequently the first host to return. Guests who have hosted five or more times are sometimes referred to as belonging to the Five-Timers Club, a term that originated on a sketch performed on Tom Hanks's fifth episode. As of February 11, 2017, actor Alec Baldwin holds the record for most times hosting, having performed the duty on seventeen different occasions since 1990; Baldwin took the record from actor Steve Martin who has hosted fifteen times since 1976. Occasionally, former SNL cast members and writers also host.

According to previous hosts Justin Timberlake and Shane Gillis, hosts were paid $5,000 between 2009 and 2024.

Each episode also features a musical guest, a solo act, or a band, who performs two or three musical numbers. Occasionally, the musical guest simultaneously serves as the host, and may also appear in comedy sketches. As of October 11, 2020, Dave Grohl is the most frequent musical guest, performing on fourteen shows since 1992.

Michaels does not allow musical guests to perform using lip-synching tracks, believing it diminishes the live aspect of the show. Exceptions are made only when the musical act is focused on intense dance routines instead of vocals, in acknowledgment of the difficulty in being both heavily physically active and singing. A 1975 performance by pop group ABBA was the first and only act to feature lip-synching, until the controversial 2004 performance of Ashlee Simpson.

The December 18, 2021, episode (hosted by Paul Rudd) became the first episode to not feature any musical performances since the first episode of season 12, as well as the third episode in the show's duration to not have a musical guest, due to the rise of the Omicron variant in New York City during the COVID-19 pandemic. Charli XCX was planned as the musical guest, but her performance was cancelled due to the new restrictions as the show had a "limited cast and crew" and no audience.

==== Miskel Spillman ====
Miskel Spillman (September 8, 1897 – March 30, 1992) was the winner of the only "Anyone Can Host" contest on Saturday Night Live, and hosted the December 17, 1977, broadcast. An 80-year-old German immigrant and grandmother from New Orleans, Spillman held the record as the oldest host in SNL's history (two weeks older than Ruth Gordon when she hosted on January 22, 1977) for thirty-two years, until it was broken on May 8, 2010, by 88-year-old Betty White. Spillman remains the only non-celebrity to host the program. Entrants to Saturday Night Live's "Anyone Can Host" contest were asked to write, in 25 words or less, why they should be selected to host the program. Spillman's winning entry read: "I'm 80 years old. I need one more cheap thrill, since my doctor told me I only have another 25 years left." After hosting, Spillman remained a fan of the program and stayed up to watch it in her later years, proclaiming herself to particularly enjoy Dana Carvey and especially his character, The Church Lady.

=== The Band ===
The Saturday Night Live Band (also known as "The Live Band") is the house band for SNL. Academy Award-winning composer Howard Shore served as the first musical director, from 1975 to 1980, appearing in many musical sketches, including Howard Shore and His All-Nurse Band and (backing a U.S. Coast Guard chorus) Howard Shore and the Shore Patrol. Over the years, the band has featured several New York studio musicians including Paul Shaffer (1975–1980), Lou Marini (1975–1983), Buddy Williams (1975–1985), Marcus Miller (1979–1981), David Sanborn (1975), Michael Brecker (the early 1980s), Ray Chew (1980–1983), Alan Rubin (1975–1983), Georg Wadenius (1979–1985), Steve Ferrone (1985), David Johansen (performing as Buster Poindexter), Tom Malone (who took over as musical director from 1981 to 1985), and G. E. Smith (musical director from 1985 to 1995). As of 2017, the band is under the leadership of Tower of Power alumnus Lenny Pickett, keyboardist Leon Pendarvis, and Eli Brueggemann, who does not play in the band on the live show. The band plays instrumentals leading in and out of station breaks; affiliates who run no advertising during these interludes hear the band play complete songs behind a Saturday Night Live bumper graphic until the program resumes. The band plays "Closing Theme (Waltz in A)", written by Shore, at the end of the show.

== Production ==
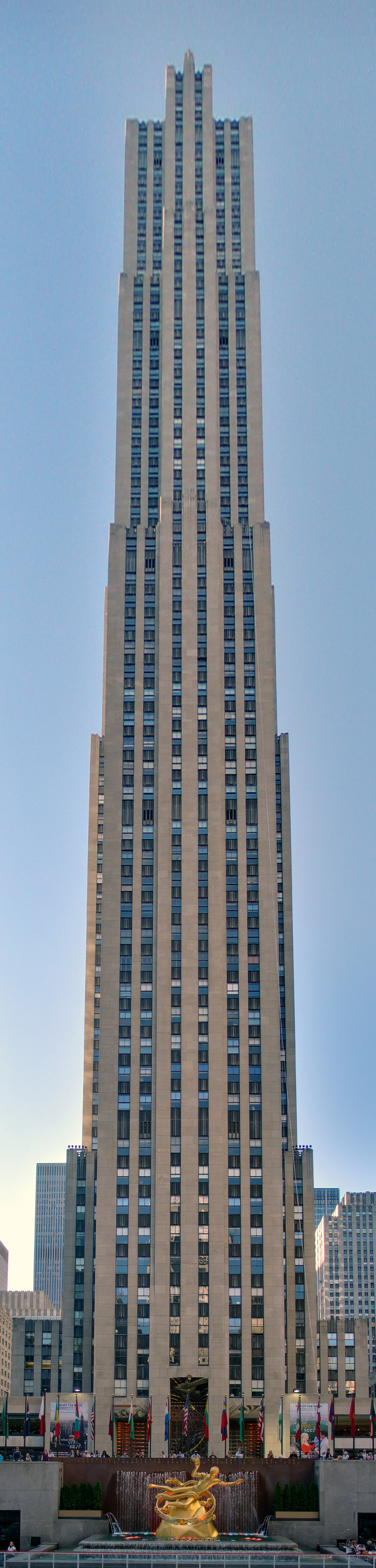
Comcast Building (30 Rockefeller Plaza, or "30 Rock") from which the show is broadcast

=== The studio ===
Since the show's inception, SNL has aired from Studio 8H, located on floors eight and nine of the Comcast Building (formerly the RCA Building and GE Building, now 30 Rockefeller Plaza or "30 Rock"). Three of the shows of the 1976–77 season were shot at the former NBC Studios in Brooklyn, due to NBC News using Studio 8H for presidential election coverage.

During the summer 2005 shooting hiatus, crews began renovations on Studio 8H. With its thirty-first-season premiere in October 2005, the show began broadcasting in high-definition television, appearing letterboxed on conventional television screens. The offices of SNL writers, producers, and other staff can be found on the 17th floor of "30 Rock".

=== Creating an episode ===
Production on an SNL episode will normally start on a Monday with a free-form pitch meeting between the cast, writers, producers, including Michaels and the guest host in Michaels's office over two hours. The host is invited to pitch ideas during this meeting. Although some sketchwriting may occur on the day, the bulk of the work revolves around pitching ideas. Tuesday is the only day dedicated purely to writing the scripts, a process that usually extends through the night into the following morning. Writing may not begin until 8:00 p.m. on Tuesday. At 5:00 p.m. on Wednesday, the sketches are read by the cast during a round-table meeting in the writers' room, attended by the writers and producers present during the pitch meeting, technical experts such as make-up artists, who may be required to realize certain sketch ideas such as those using prosthetics, and other producers, resulting in attendance of approximately fifty people. At this point, there may be at least forty sketch ideas that are read-through in turn, lasting upwards of three hours.

After completion of the read-through, Michaels, the head writer, the guest host, and some of the show producers will move to Michaels' office to decide the layout of the show and decide which of the sketches will be developed for air. Once complete, the writers and cast are allowed into Michaels's office to view the show breakdown and learn whether or not their sketch has survived. Sketches may be rewritten starting the same day, but will certainly commence on Thursday. Work focuses on developing and rewriting the remaining sketches and possibly rehearsals. If a sketch is still scheduled beyond Thursday, it is rehearsed on Friday or Saturday before moving to a rehearsal before a live audience at 8:00 p.m., again on Saturday, before the live show. After the rehearsal, Michaels will review the show lineup to ensure it meets a 90-minute length, and sketches that have made it as far as the live rehearsal may be removed. This often results in less than two days of rehearsal for the eight to twelve sketches that have made it to the stage that then may appear on the live broadcast. The opening monologue, spoken by the guest host, is given low priority and can be written as late as Saturday afternoon.

According to an interview with Tina Fey in 2004, the three- to four-member dedicated Weekend Update writing team will write jokes throughout the week. The host(s) of Weekend Update will normally not work with or read the scripts from the team until Thursday evening after the main show sketches have been finalized. The host(s) will then work on contributing to the script where necessary.

=== Post-production ===
With onsite facilities housed on floors eight and seventeen of Rockefeller Plaza, post-production duties on live broadcasts of Saturday Night Live include the mixing of audio and video elements by the Senior Audio Mixer, coupled with additional audio feeds consisting of music, sound effects, music scoring, and pre-recorded voiceovers. All sources are stored digitally, with shows captured and segregated into individual elements to reorganize for future repeats and syndication. The production tracking system was migrated from primarily analog to digital in 1998, with live shows typically requiring 1.5 terabytes of storage, consisting of audio elements and five cameras' worth of visual elements. Elements of Saturday Night Live that are pre-recorded, such as certain commercial parodies, SNL Digital Shorts, and show graphics are processed off-site in the post-production facilities of Broadway Video.

=== Filming and photography ===
Studio 8H production facilities are maintained by NBC Production Services. As of 2018, the show uses five Sony HDC-1500 cameras, primarily mounted on Vinten pedestals, although one is mounted on a Chapman-Leonard Electra crane.

As of 2014, a Grass Valley GVG 4000-3 digital component production switcher and GVG 7000 digital component routing switcher are used to route visual feeds to the control room, with multiple digital and analog video recorders used to store footage. Graphics are provided by a Chyron Lyric Pro character generator and an Avid Deko character generator. Audio facilities consist of a Calrec T Series digitally controlled analog mixing console, and a Yamaha digital mixing console used for tape playback support and utility audio work. While exact budgets for other seasons are not known, the 39th season (2013–14) had a budget of over $70 million, for which it received a subsidy from New York State in the amount of $12.3 million.

Edie Baskin was the original SNL photographer. She was hired after Michaels saw her photographs of Las Vegas and other work. Baskin helped create the opening title sequence for the show by taking photos of New York City at night. The first episode used publicity photos of host George Carlin as transitional bumpers between the show and commercial breaks, the second episode used photos Baskin had already taken of host Paul Simon. It was then that Michaels suggested that Baskin photograph the hosts for the bumpers instead of using publicity photos, beginning a tradition that continues today. For the first five seasons, Baskin's bumper photos, which were always in black and white, had a hand drawn feel to them, with her drawing directly on the photos with neon or pastel colors over that week's host or on the background.

Since 1999, Mary Ellen Matthews has been the official photographer of SNL, responsible for devising distinctive photo layouts and aesthetics for still imagery used on the show. Matthews creates photo portraits of the hosts and musical guests of each episode which are used as commercial bumpers. The limited time frame between the host's involvement in the production process and the Live show requires Matthews to create makeshift photo studios on-site at 30 Rock, with Matthews attempting to shoot the host on Tuesday and the musical guest on Thursday, although the availability of either can mean the photoshoot for both occurs as late as Thursday. Matthews employs flattering portrait lighting with hard lights to achieve a Hollywood style. On the lighting, Matthews commented: "I think it just helps the image pop off the screen ... If you use soft or flat lighting, it becomes not as dimensional ... The [classic Hollywood lighting] gives a little more contrast, and if I use edge lights and then light the background, it goes farther and farther back. I try to achieve that depth as much as I can." Matthews is also responsible for taking cast photos, behind-the-scenes images, documenting rehearsals, and promotional photos. As of 2010, she has also been involved in directing videos, including the show title sequence.

== Broadcast ==
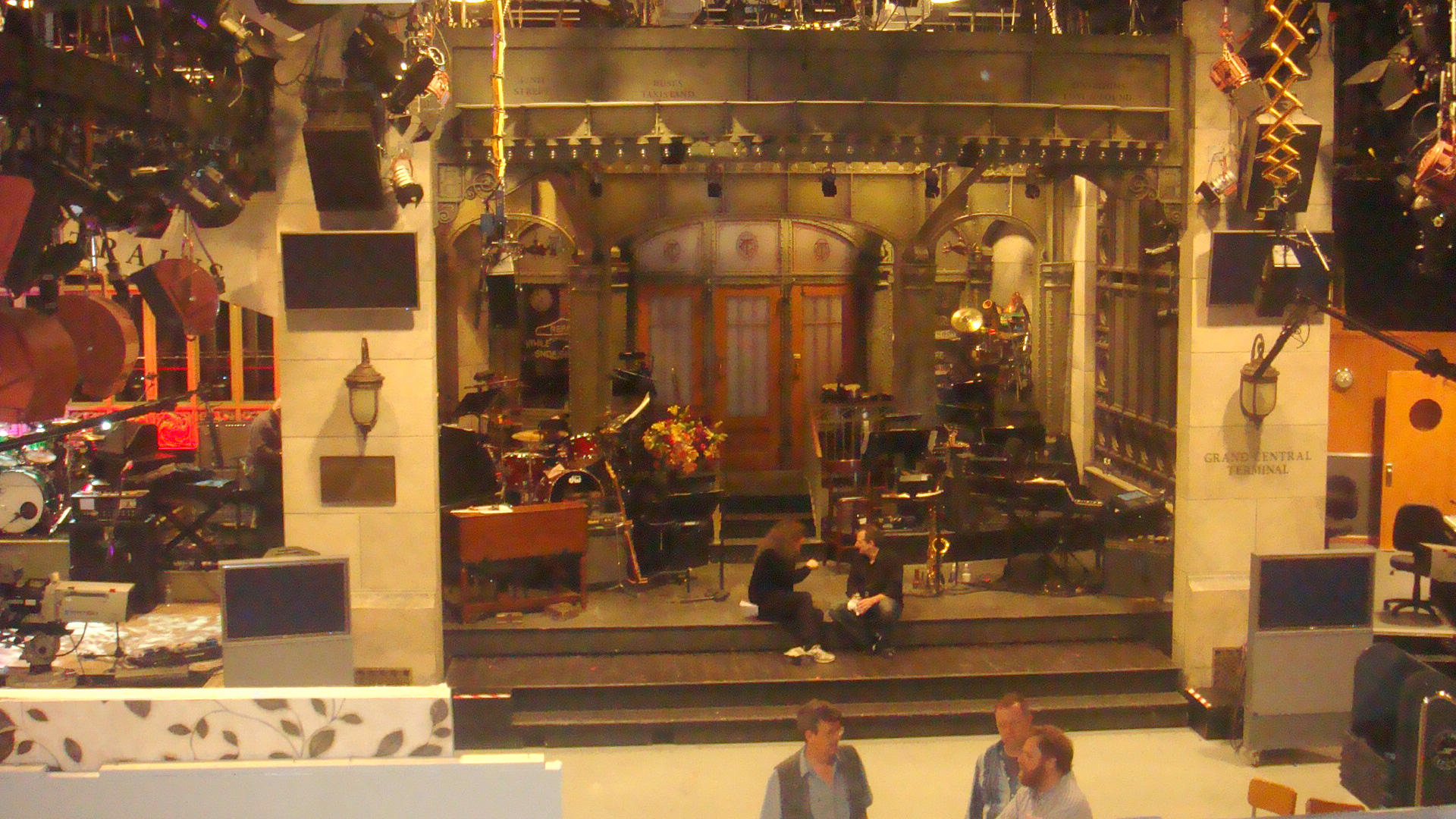
SNL's main stage during rehearsal, 2008

The show begins at 11:29:30 p.m. Eastern Time, and is scheduled for a 93-minute timeslot ending at 1:02 a.m.

For most of SNL's history, it aired live only to NBC stations in the Eastern and Central Time Zones, with all others receiving a recorded broadcast at the normal start time of late-night network programming (11:30 p.m. Pacific and 10:30 p.m. in other time zones). Since 2017, the show is broadcast live across the contiguous United States. Because the show airs outside of the safe harbor outside of Eastern and Central Time, a brief broadcast delay is installed to meet Federal Communications Commission regulations of primetime programming.

Outside of the contiguous United States, the show also airs live on the three NBC stations in Alaska at 7:30 p.m. local. Two NBC stations still broadcast SNL on tape delay: KHNL in Honolulu delays it one hour (two hours during Eastern daylight-saving time) to 7:30 p.m. local, and KUAM-TV in Guam, where the live broadcast is fourteen hours ahead at 1:30 p.m. on Sunday afternoon, delays it to 11:00 p.m. that night.

Since the first opening in 1975 with Michael O'Donoghue, Chevy Chase, and John Belushi, the show has normally begun with a cold open sketch which ends with one or more cast members breaking character and proclaiming "Live from New York, it's Saturday Night!", followed by the opening credits.

In February 2013, NBC began airing shortened hour-long repeats on select Saturday evenings at 10:00 p.m. Eastern Time during the regular season (these may be preempted due to the live airing happening in primetime on the West Coast); the episodes scheduled were sometimes rebroadcasts of the previous week's episode if it was a first-run broadcast. Beginning with the 2014–15 season, the show's 40th anniversary, the prime time rebroadcasts were a selection of episodes from throughout the show's run under the title SNL Vintage (a title used only within television listings, never appearing on-air). The network dropped the vintage titling and changed to very recent rebroadcasts beginning in the 2023–2024 season.

NBC and Broadway Video both hold the underlying rights to the show, while the copyright to every episode lies either with NBC or Universal Television. From 1990 until 2004, and again since 2015, Comedy Central and its predecessor Ha! aired reruns of the series, after which E! signed a deal to carry reruns. Abbreviated thirty- and sixty-minute versions of the first five seasons aired as The Best of Saturday Night Live in syndication (from Orion Television; at the time, the FCC's fin-syn rules prevented NBC from directly distributing reruns of the show) beginning in the 1980s, and later on Nick at Nite in 1988. In September 2010, reruns of most episodes made from 1998 onward began airing on VH1. Starting in February 2016, VH1 and Comedy Central's sister channel Logo began airing reruns of 2006-onward episodes on Sunday nights, launching its broadcast as counterprogramming for Super Bowl 50 and branding it the "Live From New York, It's Satur-Gay Night!" marathon. Though the show would slowly phase out the cable syndication in favor of streaming through NBC.com, the now-defunct namesake show app, and NBC app, select seasons on Netflix until the mid-2010s, then the NBC-associated streaming services Seeso and Hulu at various points in the late 2010s, Yahoo! Screen in a one-year deal exclusively for clips only, then the Peacock streaming service upon its launch in 2020, a majority of the show's "best of" specials would still run on the E! network in that span. The show would return to broadcast syndication in September 2024, as free-to-air multicast network TBD (rebranded as Roar on April 28, 2025, coinciding with a refocusing of the network around unscripted, sketch and improv comedy programming) acquired the rights to the show, airing hour-long edits of all recent and past seasons.

On March 16, 2017, NBC announced it would air the final four episodes of the 42nd season live in all mainland U.S. time zones for the first time, creating a communal experience across the states. NBC executive Robert Greenblatt explained the show's significant viewership had made it part of the "national conversation", and thus, they felt it would be appropriate for the entire country to be "in on the joke at the same time". NBC announced on September 19, 2017, that all subsequent episodes would air live coast-to-coast in the U.S.

Beginning in the 2021–2022 season, the show has been simultaneously broadcast live on Peacock, initially with a limited run of episodes before going with every episode. The show has also experimented with live broadcasts on YouTube, beginning with a 2021 Elon Musk-hosted episode. It currently offers the monologue live through YouTube.

=== Delays ===
The episode scheduled for October 25, 1986, hosted by Rosanna Arquette, was not aired until November 8 due to NBC broadcasting game 6 of the 1986 World Series between the New York Mets and Boston Red Sox; the game entered extra innings and ended at 12:32 a.m. Eastern, causing that night's broadcast of SNL to be canceled. The show was recorded for the studio audience starting at 1:30 a.m. and broadcast two weeks later, with Mets pitcher Ron Darling delivering a jocular "apology" as the cold open.

The episode scheduled for February 10, 2001, hosted by Jennifer Lopez, aired 45 minutes late due to an XFL game. Lopez and the cast were not told they were airing on a delay. Michaels was so upset by the delay the episode was rerun a mere three weeks later. The fledgling football league ended up changing their rules in order to speed up play, and a deal was reached where the feed to future games would be cut off when SNL started, so that no such incident would happen again.

The November 7, 2020, episode, hosted by Dave Chappelle, began at 12:10 a.m. Eastern after a Clemson-Notre Dame college football game went into double overtime.

The October 12, 2024, episode, hosted by Ariana Grande, began at 11:35 p.m. Eastern due to a primetime college football overrun. It was the first overrun under a new rights deal with the Big Ten Conference in which games air regularly in the Saturday prime time slot on NBC.

The October 18, 2025, episode, hosted by Sabrina Carpenter, began at 11:42 p.m. Eastern after a USC-Notre Dame college football game ran long.

The September 26, 2026, episode, hosted by Jalen Brunson, aired 16 minutes late on some NBC affiliates due to an Oregon-USC football game overrun, but did air live on other markets (including New York affiliate WNBC) and Peacock.

The October 3, 2026, episode, hosted by Dakota Johnson, aired 11 minutes late in some markets due to a Washington-USC football game overrun, but did air live on the NBC O&O affiliates and Peacock.

The October 31, 2026, episode, hosted by Inde Navarrette, aired 8 minutes late in some markets due to an Ohio State-USC football game overrun, but did air live on the NBC O&O affiliates and Peacock.

The November 7, 2026, episode, hosted by Druski, aired 10 minutes late in some markets due to a Notre Dame-Miami game overrun, but did air live on the NBC O&O affiliates and Peacock.

== International versions ==
Because SNL has been a huge success in the United States, channels in other countries have created their own versions of the show, including Brazil, Germany, Spain, South Korea, Japan, Russia, Canada, Finland, France, Italy, and Poland.

In the mid-late 1980s Channel 4, in association with London Weekend Television, created a show for British audiences called Saturday Live and Friday Night Live, the repeat version was entitled "Saturday Almost Live". It was based on the SNL format but had no direct connection to the American program.

A German version of SNL named RTL Samstag Nacht aired between 1993 and 1998 on RTL Television. Most episodes were hosted by German celebrities, however, some shows were hosted by American personalities who never hosted the American version, including Mel Brooks and Michael Winslow. Due to language barriers, they appeared only in opening monologues and in a limited number of sketches.

SNL in its original American version has aired in Israel since the early 2000s and is broadcast by satellite provider yes. An SNL inspired Israeli show, Eretz Nehederet (A Wonderful Country), debuted in 2003 and continues to garner high ratings.

SNL also airs in the Middle East and North Africa, OSN First HD every Saturday night, one week after it airs in the U.S.

In India and Sri Lanka, Saturday Night Live! airs an hour-long version on Comedy Central one week after the U.S. broadcast.

Spain's version of the show was short-lived, lasting a few episodes which aired on Thursdays and not Saturdays as the title suggested. This version copied heavily from the American version, as they did their own versions of sketches already done on the original series.

Italy's Saturday Night Live From Milan aired for four seasons and used original material.

On December 3, 2011, South Korea's SNL Korea premiered on cable channel tvN. As of November 11, 2017, has completed nine seasons with 205 episodes. On September 4, 2021, it was rebooted and broadcast through Coupang Play, a South Korean OTT service. Only the broadcasting stations are different, but the members are similar or reinforced.

The Japanese version Saturday Night Live Japan, which ran for six months in 2011, was created in part with sponsor Coca-Cola and Lorne Michaels's production company, Broadway Video, and broadcast on Fuji TV networks. The show followed the same format with a few minor differences, being only 45 minutes long and hosted by a permanent host. The cast was made up of seasoned comedians who take center stage and newcomers who play the background roles. It was broadcast once a month, and ended after six episodes, as planned from the start.

In 2013, the Russian channel NTV aired the SNL adaptation entitled Суббота. Вечер. Шоу (Saturday. Evening. Show) and produced by Endemol's Weit Media. Unlike other international versions, it was not broadcast live. Due to low ratings and negative reviews, the third episode was pulled from the schedule. The remaining six episodes eventually aired in January 2014, but without any announcements and under a different title: Сегодня. Вечер. Шоу (Today. Evening. Show). Reruns of the adaptation were aired at night on NTV throughout the first half of 2015.

In 2014, two ninety-minute specials were broadcast in French on Télé-Québec in the Canadian province of Quebec under the title SNL Québec; the specials were broadcast on February 8 and March 22, 2014. Hosted by Louis-José Houde and Stéphane Rousseau, it is the same format and length as the original SNL series. Certain sketches from the original program, such as Debbie Downer and Schweddy Balls, were adapted into French, while other sketches were original material written directly for the Quebec series. On May 13, 2014, SNL Quebec was renewed for another eight episodes to be broadcast monthly over the 2014–15 season ending with a "Best of" compilation. Télé-Québec announced in May 2015 the series would not be renewed due to funding cutbacks, and Ici Radio-Canada Télé subsequently signed the show's production team and cast to produce a new series, Le nouveau show, for that network.

The French channel M6 launched the pilot episode of its SNL adaptation, Le Saturday Night Live, in January 2017.

The Polish division of Showmax video-on-demand streaming service launched the first season of its SNL adaptation, SNL Polska on December 2, 2017. The show received mixed reviews, however improving by the end of the series. Following the first series, a stand-alone "Weekend Update" was introduced in autumn 2018. In December 2018, Showmax announced the closure of its Polish branch, effectively cancelling the show.

On December 10, 2021, Deadline reported that Sky One was working on a British version of Saturday Night Live. In 2025, it was announced that the UK version had been ordered to series for a 2026 release, with Lorne Michaels producing. It premiered on the relaunched Sky One channel and the streaming service NOW on March 21, 2026.

Country	Name	Station	Broadcast	Language
Brazil	Saturday Night Live	RedeTV!	May 27, 2012 – October 20, 2012	Portuguese
Canada	SNL Québec	Télé-Québec	February 8, 2014 – March 21, 2015	French
China	周六夜现场 (Zhōuliù Yè Xiànchǎng)	Youku	June 23, 2018 – September 8, 2018	Mandarin
Egypt	ساترداي نايت لايف بالعربي; Saturday Night Live Arabic	OSN; ONtv	February 16, 2016 – January 6, 2018	Arabic
France	Le Saturday Night Live	M6	January 5, 2017 (single episode)	French
Germany	RTL Samstag Nacht	RTL Television	November 6, 1993 – May 23, 1998	German
Italy	Saturday Night Live from Milano; Saturday Night Live	Italia 1 TV8	2006 – 2011; April 7, 2018 – May 12, 2018	Italian
Japan	サタデーナイトライブ JPN; Saturday Night Live JPN	Fuji TV	October 27, 2012 – November 17, 2012	Japanese
Poland	SNL Polska	Showmax	December 2, 2017 – March 17, 2018	Polish
Russia	Суббота. Вечер. Шоу; Сегодня. Вечер. Шоу	NTV	September 13, 2013 – January 11, 2014	Russian
South Korea	SNL 코리아; Saturday Night Live Korea	tvN	December 3, 2011 – November 18, 2017	Korean
South Korea	SNL 코리아; Saturday Night Live Korea	Coupang Play	September 4, 2021 – present	Korean
Spain	Saturday Night Live	Cuatro	February 5, 2009 – May 13, 2009	Spanish
Finland	Saturday Night Live Suomi	MTV3	February 6, 2016 – April 23, 2016	Finnish
United Kingdom	Saturday Live; Friday Night Live	Channel 4 BBC1; ITV	January 12, 1985 – April 29, 1988; March 12, 1993; June 1 – July 20, 1996; December 1, 2007; October 21, 2022	English
United Kingdom	Saturday Night Live UK	Sky One; Now	March 21, 2026 – present	English

== U.S. television ratings ==
The show's ratings increased steadily for several years after its debut, reaching their highest point in the fifth season. Ratings entered into a period of decline after that, never again reaching those heights, but had rebounded enough by the early 1990s to make the 1992–93 season the fifth-highest rated in the show's history. Since then, ratings have trended steadily lower. As of 2018, thirteen of the show's lowest-rated seasons occurred in the 2000s. The show's ratings have often experienced temporary spikes during U.S. presidential election years.

Season	Years	Episodes	Start date	End date	Viewers (Mil.)	Overall rating	18–49 rating
1	1975–76	24	October 11, 1975	July 31, 1976	N/A	6.4	N/A
2	1976–77	22	September 18, 1976	May 21, 1977	N/A	7.9	N/A
3	1977–78	20	September 24, 1977	May 20, 1978	N/A	9.8	N/A
4	1978–79	20	October 7, 1978	May 26, 1979	N/A	13.1	N/A
5	1979–80	20	October 13, 1979	May 24, 1980	N/A	13.5	N/A
6	1980–81	13	November 15, 1980	April 11, 1981	N/A	9.5	N/A
7	1981–82	20	October 3, 1981	May 22, 1982	N/A	8.0	N/A
8	1982–83	20	September 25, 1982	May 14, 1983	N/A	7.4	N/A
9	1983–84	19	October 8, 1983	May 12, 1984	N/A	7.4	N/A
10	1984–85	17	October 6, 1984	April 13, 1985	N/A	7.5	N/A
11	1985–86	18	November 9, 1985	May 24, 1986	N/A	7.1	N/A
12	1986–87	20	October 11, 1986	May 23, 1987	N/A	7.6	N/A
13	1987–88	13	October 17, 1987	February 27, 1988	11.77	8.4	6.4
14	1988–89	20	October 8, 1988	May 20, 1989	10.73	7.9	5.5
15	1989–90	20	September 30, 1989	May 19, 1990	11.09	8.1	5.8
16	1990–91	20	September 29, 1990	May 18, 1991	10.55	7.5	5.7
17	1991–92	20	September 28, 1991	May 16, 1992	12.37	8.8	6.8
18	1992–93	20	September 26, 1992	May 15, 1993	12.67	9.2	7.1
19	1993–94	20	September 25, 1993	May 14, 1994	11.32	8.2	6.3
20	1994–95	20	September 24, 1994	May 13, 1995	9.87	7.2	5.4
21	1995–96	20	September 30, 1995	May 18, 1996	7.40	5.6	3.8
22	1996–97	20	September 28, 1996	May 17, 1997	9.08	6.7	4.8
23	1997–98	20	September 27, 1997	May 9, 1998	9.18	6.6	5.0
24	1998–99	19	September 26, 1998	May 15, 1999	8.44	6.1	4.5
25	1999–00	20	October 2, 1999	May 20, 2000	8.32	6.0	4.4
26	2000–01	20	October 7, 2000	May 19, 2001	8.88	6.2	4.6
27	2001–02	20	September 29, 2001	May 18, 2002	8.78	5.8	4.4
28	2002–03	20	October 5, 2002	May 17, 2003	8.34	5.5	4.1
29	2003–04	20	October 4, 2003	May 15, 2004	8.09	5.5	3.8
30	2004–05	20	October 2, 2004	May 21, 2005	7.47	5.1	3.6
31	2005–06	19	October 1, 2005	May 20, 2006	6.96	4.7	3.2
32	2006–07	20	September 30, 2006	May 19, 2007	6.90	4.6	3.0
33	2007–08	12	September 29, 2007	May 17, 2008	6.87	4.5	3.0
34	2008–09	22	September 13, 2008	May 16, 2009	9.17	5.8	3.9
35	2009–10	22	September 26, 2009	May 15, 2010	8.41	5.2	3.5
36	2010–11	22	September 25, 2010	May 21, 2011	8.46	5.2	3.4
37	2011–12	22	September 24, 2011	May 19, 2012	8.38	5.4	3.3
38	2012–13	21	September 15, 2012	May 18, 2013	8.31	5.4	3.4
39	2013–14	21	September 28, 2013	May 17, 2014	8.37	5.2	3.3
40	2014–15	21	September 27, 2014	May 16, 2015	7.42	4.6	2.7
41	2015–16	21	October 3, 2015	May 21, 2016	8.70	4.9	2.9
42	2016–17	21	October 1, 2016	May 20, 2017	11.00	5.6	3.5
43	2017–18	21	September 29, 2017	May 19, 2018	7.55	N/A	N/A
44	2018–19	21	September 29, 2018	May 18, 2019	N/A	N/A	N/A
45	2019–20	18	September 28, 2019	May 9, 2020	N/A	N/A	1.5
46	2020–21	20	October 3, 2020	May 22, 2021			
47	2021–22	21	October 2, 2021	May 21, 2022			
48	2022–23	18	October 1, 2022	April 15, 2023			
49	2023–24	20	October 14, 2023	May 18, 2024			
50	2024–25	20	September 28, 2024	May 17, 2025			
51	2025–26	20	October 4, 2025	May 16, 2026			

== Reception ==
In 2002 SNL was ranked tenth on TV Guide's 50 Greatest TV Shows of All Time, while in 2007 it was honored with inclusion on Time magazine's list of "100 Best TV Shows of All-TIME".

In June 2013 the show was placed at number 25 on the list of the 101 best written shows of all time by the Writers Guild of America, assessing series from the previous seventy years. In December 2013, TV Guide ranked it #18 on their list of the 60 Greatest Shows of All Time. A 2015 The Hollywood Reporter survey of 2,800 actors, producers, directors, and other industry people named SNL as their #7 favorite show. It is currently the longest running sketch comedy show on television.

In 2016 a New York Times study of the fifty television shows with the most Facebook likes found that SNL "is very much an urban show. It is most popular in cities throughout the country, and college towns. Amherst, Mass.; Madison, Wis.; and Ithaca, N.Y. are all among the top 10."

Some critics have cautioned that the show is too dependent upon visiting guest actors and former SNL cast members – particularly for its impersonations of prominent politicians in the 2020 U.S. Presidential Election races – and is beginning to have difficulty producing relevant, truly funny content.

In 2023, Variety ranked Saturday Night Live #15 on its list of the 100 greatest TV shows of all time.

=== Accolades ===
Saturday Night Live has won numerous awards since its debut, including 113 Primetime Emmy Awards, six Writers Guild of America Awards, and three Peabody Awards. In 2009 it received a total of thirteen Emmy nominations for a lifetime total of 126, breaking the record for the most award-nominated show in Primetime Emmy Award history, previously set with 124 by hospital drama ER. As of September 2022, it has received a record total of 305 Primetime Emmy Award nominations. In 2025, the show broke its own record by winning 11 Creative Arts Emmy Awards, bringing the total number of Emmy Awards to 113.

Twenty-five cast members have received individual Primetime Emmy Award nominations in the show's history. These nominations were mostly in the category of Individual Performance in a Variety or Music Program before that award was discontinued; since then, nominations have been in the Supporting Actor and Supporting Actress categories for comedy series. Of the 54 total nominations for these twenty-five performers, four have won: Chevy Chase (1976), Gilda Radner (1978), Dana Carvey (1993), and Kate McKinnon (2016, 2017). In addition, Alec Baldwin received two Emmy nominations, winning once in 2017, for his recurring guest role as Donald Trump.

=== Electoral effect ===
SNL has affected American elections, most commonly presidential elections. Voters have reported that political sketches shown on the program influenced them in the voting booth. The so-called "SNL Effect" was observed during the 2008 presidential campaign, according to Mike Dabadie. Two-thirds of voters who responded to a poll said they had seen a broadcast of politically charged content on SNL, with ten percent saying it had made a difference in their decision. Barack Obama was the beneficiary of the political content, with 59 percent saying they did in fact cast a vote for the Democratic then-nominee. Chevy Chase's bumbling impression of then-president Gerald Ford during the 1976 presidential election was cited as an influence on the election, and a quote commonly attributed to 2008 vice-presidential candidate Sarah Palin stating "I can see Russia from my house" was actually spoken by SNL cast member Tina Fey while portraying Palin. The political content was abandoned briefly following the September 11, 2001, terrorist attack in New York, with Amy Poehler saying the writers did not want to produce politicized material.

Several politicians have appeared on SNL, including President Gerald Ford (in 1976, during the show's first season), then-Senator Barack Obama (2007), Senator John McCain (2002 and 2008), Secretary Hillary Clinton (2008 and 2015), and Governor Sarah Palin (2008), who appeared alongside Fey's Palin impression, resulting in the show's largest audience in fourteen years with fourteen million viewers. Senator Obama's appearance occurred in part because Hillary Clinton abandoned her scheduled appearance. Donald Trump hosted the show in 2015, which was met with controversy. Kamala Harris, the Democratic Party's nominee for the 2024 United States presidential election, made a guest appearance on November 2, 2024.

Notable Portrayals of U.S. Presidents
President	SNL Cast Member
Gerald Ford	Chevy Chase
Jimmy Carter	Dan Aykroyd
Ronald Reagan	Phil Hartman
George H.W. Bush	Dana Carvey
Bill Clinton	Darrell Hammond
George W. Bush	Will Ferrell
Barack Obama	Jay Pharoah
Donald Trump	Alec Baldwin
Joe Biden	Mikey Day
Donald Trump	James Austin Johnson

== Controversies & incidents ==
Sinéad O'Connor tears apart a picture of Pope John Paul II during a live SNL performance.

Due to its live broadcast, the show has been the subject of numerous controversies and incidents since its inception, involving controversial performers, content, technical problems, profanities (both intentional and accidental), and accusations of joke plagiarism.

One incident that garnered widespread media coverage was a 1992 appearance by singer Sinéad O'Connor, in which she ripped up a photo of Pope John Paul II during her performance in an effort to protest the Catholic Church. This led to hundreds of complaints from viewers and widespread criticism at the time, although retrospective opinion of her action has been more positive since the Church's cover-up of abuse became public many years later.

An ongoing controversy includes the inclusion (or exclusion) of minority representation in the cast. For example, only 9 Black women have ever been cast members on SNL. Critics of this lack of representation point to not only the importance of inclusion, but also the value of varied perspectives on creativity, story-telling, and human experience.

Technical issues have also led to major controversies, such as in a widely publicized incident involving singer Ashlee Simpson in 2004 where she appeared to lip sync during her second performance, appearing flustered when the wrong song was played. Simpson was the only musical performer in the show's history to unexpectedly leave the stage mid-performance, later apologizing for the incident and explaining that she had lost her voice earlier in the week.

=== Representations of minorities ===
Over the years, SNL has been criticized for stereotypical and sparse representation of racial and gender groups. A 2016 study of SNL episodes from 1975 to 2016 (826 total) revealed over 90% of episodes had white hosts, while 6.8% were black, 1.2% were Hispanic, and 1.1% were of another racial minority.

Chris Rock indicated he grew frustrated with being limited to sketches where he played stereotypical roles such as a rapper or Black political activist, and left the show to perform on In Living Color, which featured a mostly Black cast and would offer Rock more creative freedom. He would later host the show 4 times in 1996, 2014, 2020 and 2024. When longtime cast member Kenan Thompson suggested in 2013 that female African-American representation was low because producers were not finding such comedians who were "ready", media outlets countered it was SNL that was not ready, and the racial disparity "is symptomatic of problems deeply rooted in comedy and the entertainment industry at large". Thompson also refused to play any more black women on the show and demanded SNL hire black women instead. Since its inception, SNL has included only nine Black female cast members: Yvonne Hudson (1980), Danitra Vance (1985), Ellen Cleghorne (1991–1995), Maya Rudolph (2000–2007), Sasheer Zamata (2014–2017), Leslie Jones (2014–2019), Ego Nwodim (2018–2025), Punkie Johnson (2020–2024), and Saidah Belo-Osagie. As of the 2025–2026 season, over half of SNL's seasons have not included Black female cast members.

SNL has had "little representation from Asian actors, as cast members or hosts", in its run. Until Bowen Yang's 2019 promotion from writer to on-air performer, there had been only three people of Asian descent in the cast: Fred Armisen (2002–2013) had a Korean grandfather; Rob Schneider (1988–1994) had a Filipina grandmother; and Nasim Pedrad (2009–2014) was born in Tehran, Iran. In the first forty-seven seasons, the show had seven hosts who were of Asian descent.

Denny Dillon was the first gay cast member in the 1980–81 season, but was in the closet at the time. So was Danitra Vance, who was the first Black lesbian cast member in the 11th season. Terry Sweeney was SNL's first openly gay male cast member, appearing in the 1985–1986 season. Sweeney was also the first openly gay series regular on network television. Bowen Yang is the sixth LGBTQ cast member, hired in 2019. Numerous news outlets noted the disconnect of Michaels hiring Yang, an out gay Chinese-American cast member, at the same time as Shane Gillis, who was found to have aired what was perceived as homophobic and anti-Asian jokes and slurs on his podcast. Within days, a spokesperson for Michaels announced Gillis was fired due to the controversy. (Michaels later said that it was NBC's decision, not his, to fire Gillis, and that NBC faced potential loss of ad revenue if Gillis remained.) Still, Gillis went on to host SNL three more times during its 49th, 50th, and most recently, 52nd season in 2026. Punkie Johnson became the first openly queer Black woman on the SNL cast (2020–2024). Molly Kearney became the first openly non-binary cast member in 2022.

Melissa Villaseñor joined as a featured player on the October 1, 2016, episode of SNL. Villaseñor was the second Latina cast member after Noël Wells, who is a quarter Mexican, and the first Latina to be promoted to repertory status.

== In other media ==
=== Home media ===
Universal Studios Home Entertainment and Lions Gate Entertainment hold video rights to the series. Universal has issued complete season DVD sets of the first few seasons, while Lionsgate's share of the rights is a result of prior contracts with NBC signed before the NBC Universal merger. A majority of Lionsgate's SNL DVDs are "Best Of ..." compilations.

=== Books ===
Saturday Night Live, the first authorized book about the series, was published by Avon Books in 1977 and edited by Anne Beatts and John Head, with photography by Edie Baskin; all three worked for SNL at the time the book was published. The oversized illustrated paperback included the scripts for several sketches by the 1975–80 cast. In 1986 Doug Hill and Jeff Weingrad authored Saturday Night: A Backstage History of Saturday Night Live, a behind-the-scenes look at the first ten seasons. Saturday Night Live: The First Twenty Years, by Michael Cader, was released in 1994 and presented information about the cast, characters, and other memorable moments seen on the show from 1975 to 1994.

Live From New York: An Uncensored History of Saturday Night Live, as Told By Its Stars, Writers and Guests was released in 2002. The book, written by Tom Shales and James Andrew Miller, consists of interviews with people who have worked on the show. The interviews reveal personal experiences from what happened backstage and the difficulty of getting the show on air each week. In 2004 former cast member Jay Mohr released his memoir Gasping for Airtime: Two Years in the Trenches of Saturday Night Live about his struggles during his two seasons on the show between 1993 and 1995, dealing with getting sketches on-air and the intense work schedule. Former cast member Bobby Moynihan described the book as "a handbook on what NOT to do at SNL".

=== Films ===
SNL has made several efforts to develop some of the more popular sketches into feature-length films, with varying degrees of commercial and critical success. The first foray into film came with the successful Aykroyd and Belushi vehicle, The Blues Brothers (1980), which earned over $115 million on a $27 million budget.

In 1990 Michaels oversaw the writing of a sketch anthology feature film titled The Saturday Night Live Movie with many of the show's then-current writing staff, including Al Franken, Tom Davis, Greg Daniels, Jim Downey, Conan O'Brien, Robert Smigel, and George Meyer, contributing. The screenplay only got as far as a Revised First Draft dated July 26, 1990, before being abandoned.

The success of Wayne's World (1992) encouraged Michaels to produce more film spin-offs, based on several popular sketch characters. Michaels revived 1970s characters for Coneheads (1993), followed by It's Pat (1994); Stuart Saves His Family (1995); A Night at the Roxbury (1998), Superstar (1999), and The Ladies Man (2000). Some did moderately well, though others did not – notably, It's Pat, which did so badly at the box office that the studio that made the film, Touchstone Pictures (owned by the Walt Disney Company, which also owns NBC's rival ABC), pulled it only one week after releasing it, and Stuart Saves His Family, which lost $14 million. Many of these films were produced by Paramount Pictures. The films based on The Blues Brothers were produced by Universal Studios, which merged with NBC in 2004 to form NBC Universal (Universal also has a joint venture with Paramount for international distribution of the two studios' films).

Film	Release date (United States)	Budget (estimated)	Box office revenue		
Film	Release date (United States)	Budget (estimated)	United States	Elsewhere	Worldwide
The Blues Brothers	June 20, 1980	$27 million	$57,229,890	$58,000,000	$115,229,890
Wayne's World	February 14, 1992	$20 million	$121,697,323	$61,400,000	$183,097,323
Coneheads	July 23, 1993	$33 million	$21,274,717	—N/a	$21,274,717
Wayne's World 2	December 10, 1993	$40 million	$48,197,805	—N/a	$48,197,805
It's Pat	August 26, 1994	$8 million	$60,822	—N/a	$60,822
Stuart Saves His Family	April 14, 1995	$15 million	$912,082		$912,082
Blues Brothers 2000	February 6, 1998	$28 million	$14,051,384	—N/a	$14,051,384
A Night at the Roxbury	October 2, 1998	$17 million	$30,331,165	—N/a	$30,331,165
Superstar	October 8, 1999	$14 million	$30,636,478	—N/a	$30,636,478
The Ladies Man	October 13, 2000	$24 million	$13,616,610	$126,602	$13,743,212
MacGruber	May 21, 2010	$10 million	$8,525,600	$797,295	$9,259,314

The character Bob Roberts from the Tim Robbins film of the same title (1992) first appeared on SNL in a short film about the conservative folk singer.

In addition, the 1999 comedy film Office Space originated from a series of animated short films by Mike Judge that aired on SNL in 1993.

The fictitious American folk music trio The Folksmen first appeared on SNL, performing the song "Old Joe's Place" before later appearing in the film A Mighty Wind (2002). The three members of the Folksmen were the same three comedians: Harry Shearer, Michael McKean, and Christopher Guest, who also appeared on the same episode as the rock group Spinal Tap. At the time of the appearance (the 1984–85 season), Shearer and Guest were cast members.

Mr. Bill's Real Life Adventures is based on the Mr. Bill sketches from early seasons of SNL.

In 2024, the film Saturday Night was released, about the production of the first SNL episode to air on October 11, 1975, with Gabriel LaBelle as Michaels.

=== Commercials ===
Over the years, popular characters from the show have appeared in ad campaigns for an assortment of products.

Sketch referenced	Product	Returning actors	Release date	Additional notes
Bill Swerski's Superfans	State Farm	Robert Smigel, George Wendt	September 2013	
Coneheads	State Farm	Dan Aykroyd, Jane Curtin	May 2015	Two separate Coneheads commercials in this campaign
Coneheads	Subway	N/A	1993	
I Wish It Was Christmas Today	Acura	N/A	November 2014	Cover by Julian Casablancas
Land Shark	BMW	N/A	2003	
MacGruber	Pepsi	Will Forte, Kristen Wiig	February 1, 2009	Premiered during Super Bowl XLIII, three commercials total
Mango	T by Alexander Wang	Chris Kattan	June 2014	
Mr. Bill	Subway	Walter Williams		
Mr. Bill	MasterCard	Walter Williams	June 2008	
Mr. Bill	Ramada Inn	Walter Williams	2001	
Mr. Bill	Anti-Drug PSA	Walter Williams	1980's	
Mr. Bill	Burger King	Walter Williams	1985	
Mr. Bill	America's Wetland campaign	Walter Williams	2004–2005	Pulled over Williams's concern that Shell Oil Co. exploited them for positive PR
Pumping Up with Hans & Franz	State Farm	Dana Carvey, Kevin Nealon	September 4, 2014	
The Richmeister	State Farm	Rob Schneider	September 2014	Pulled in response to Schneider's statements on vaccines
The Roxbury Guys	Diet Pepsi Max	Chris Kattan	February 2, 2008	Ran during Super Bowl XLII
Wayne's World	Uber Eats	Dana Carvey, Mike Myers	February 2021	Campaign debuted in lead-up to Super Bowl LV and ran again during the big game
Delicious Dish	Capital One	Ana Gasteyer, Molly Shannon	November 27, 2024	Also featuring Samuel L. Jackson. Branded within commercial as "Official partner of SNL 50"
The Californians	Volkswagen	Fred Armisen, Bill Hader, Kristen Wiig	February 13, 2025	Co-branded with SNL 50 and VW logos with text reading "Official Partner of SNL 50"
Weekend Update	Draft Kings	Michael Che, Colin Jost	February 8, 2026	Ran during Super Bowl LX

=== Music ===
A cast album was released in 1976 on the Arista label including the song "Chevy's Girls" and comedy bits from the show (Weekend Update, "Emily Litella", "Gun Control"); it was later re-issued on CD and MP3 download.

In 2005, the comedy troupe The Lonely Island—consisting of SNL members Andy Samberg, Akiva Schaffer, and Jorma Taccone—gained national exposure after joining the show and debuting their comedic music video "Lazy Sunday", written with fellow cast member Chris Parnell. The song became a surprise hit. It was posted on YouTube without permission from NBC; "Lazy Sunday" popularized the website, which had launched five months earlier. Schaffer said that for years after the video was released, "You couldn't kind of write a story about YouTube without mentioning us."

Further successes with songs including "Like a Boss", "Jizz in My Pants", "I'm on a Boat", "We Like Sportz", "Boombox", and "Dick in a Box" – the latter of which won the Primetime Emmy Award for Outstanding Original Music and Lyrics in 2007 – saw The Lonely Island go on to release two albums, Incredibad (2009) and Turtleneck & Chain (2011), containing SNL-developed songs and original works. The albums were released by Universal Republic Records, which was provided with a license to the SNL songs by NBC and Broadway Video.

=== Documentaries ===
On January 16, 2025, the four episode documentary series SNL50: Beyond Saturday Night, featuring rare footage and interviews with more than 60 contributors—including cast members, writers, and execs—became available to stream on Peacock. A sequel, feature-length documentary Ladies & Gentlemen... 50 Years of SNL Music, which discusses SNL's music performances and musical-comedy sketches, will then be available to stream on Peacock on January 27, 2025.

=== Other ===
Several programs have documented the behind-the-scenes events of the show. A 60 Minutes report taped in October 2004 depicted the intense writing frenzy that goes on during the week leading up to a show, with crowded meetings and long hours. The report particularly noted the involvement of the guest host(s) in developing and selecting the sketches in which they will appear. Similarly, there has been an A&E episode of Biography which covered the production process, as well as an episode of TV Tales in 2002 on E!. In 2010, Saturday Night, a 94-minute documentary by actor James Franco in his directorial debut, was released; it follows the production process of the December 6, 2008, episode hosted by John Malkovich, from the concept stage to the episode actually airing live. Although it originated as a five-minute short film for Franco's New York University film class, Michaels granted Franco access to the process, allowing the project to be expanded. On February 15, 2015, NBC aired a 3 1/2-hour special on Saturday Night Live's 40th anniversary. The program included a mix of clips, new performances of classic characters from previous cast members, and special guest appearances from previous hosts.

In September 2011 ice cream company Ben & Jerry's released a limited-edition ice cream called "Schweddy Balls", inspired by a 1998 sketch of the same name starring Alec Baldwin, Ana Gasteyer, and Molly Shannon. According to the company, the ice cream became their fastest-selling limited-edition flavor. The ice cream was also subject to criticism and boycotts by One Million Moms, a project of the American Family Association, over the "vulgar" name. Some retail chains chose not to sell the flavor, but declined to say if the decision was at their own discretion or based on the One Million Moms boycotts. In June 2014 two new flavors inspired by SNL sketches were introduced: Lazy Sunday, based on a sketch of the same name featuring Andy Samberg and Chris Parnell, and Gilly's Catastrophic Crunch based on the recurring Gilly sketches featuring Kristen Wiig. Two Wild and Crazy Pies, based on the catchphrase of the recurring Festrunk Brothers, was introduced in September 2014, followed by Wayne'Swirled, which was inspired by the eponymous Wayne's World in February 2015.

== See also ==
- Saturday Live/Friday Night Live (a British television comedy show with a similar format)
