= List of awards and nominations received by Bill Nye the Science Guy =

Awards and nominations received by Bill Nye the Science Guy
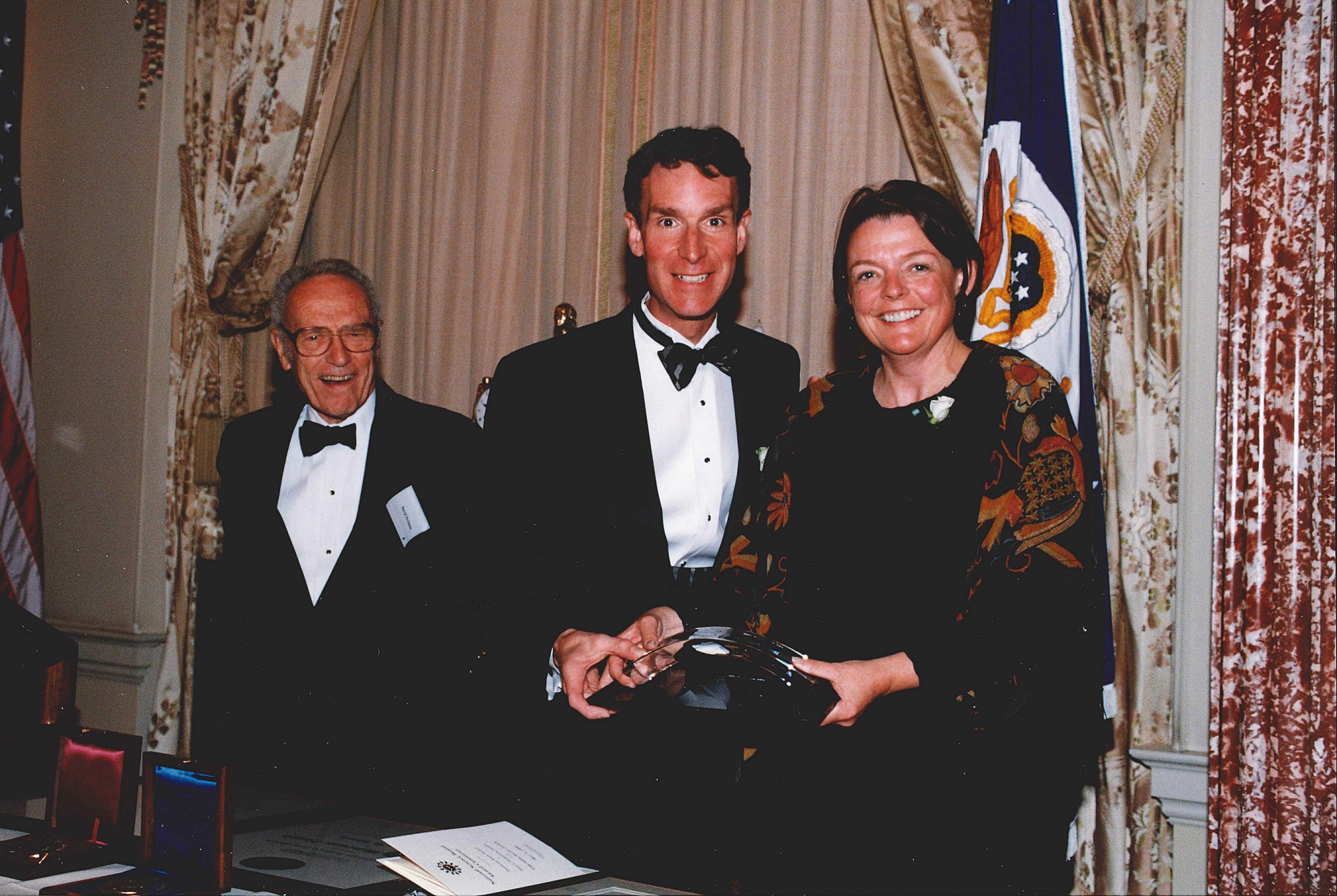
- 1999 Public Service Award from National Science Board presented to Bill Nye the Science Guy
Awards and nominations
Award	Wins	Nominations
APPC Awards	1	1
Daytime Emmy Awards	19	36
Environmental Media Awards	4	4
National Science Board Public Service Awards	1	1
Parents' Choice Awards	3	3
TCA Awards	1	2
Young Artist Awards	1	3

Totals (Note: Certain award groups do not simply award one winner. They acknowledge several different recipients, have runners-up, and have third place. Since this is a specific recognition and is different from losing an award, runner-up mentions are considered wins in this award tally. For simplification and to avoid errors, each award in this list has been presumed to have had a prior nomination.)
- Wins: 30
- Nominations: 50

Bill Nye the Science Guy is an American live action educational comedy television program that originally aired for five seasons from 1993 to 1998 on PBS Kids and was syndicated to local stations. Hosted by science educator Bill Nye, the show was produced by Buena Vista Television and KCTS-TV of Seattle. Funding support came from the Corporation for Public Broadcasting and the National Science Foundation. The 1990 Children's Television Act helped propel production on the series; this legislation required television stations to have educational programming for children. Each of the 100 half-hour episodes aims to teach a specific natural science topic to a preteen audience.

Throughout the five-year-span of production on Bill Nye the Science Guy, the program was honored with 28 Daytime Emmy Awards. In 1999 the series received recognition from the Annenberg Public Policy Center as a show which ably instructed and taught its young viewers.

== APPC Awards ==
The Annenberg Public Policy Center gives out the APPC Awards to recognize excellence in educational instruction. Bill Nye the Science Guy has won once.

Year	Category	Nominee(s)	Result	Ref(s)
1999	Outstanding Educational Program on a Commercial Broadcast Station	Series production staff; award was shared with The Magic School Bus and Nick News with Linda Ellerbee.	Won	

== Daytime Emmy Awards ==
The Daytime Emmy Awards is an American accolade bestowed by the New York–based National Academy of Television Arts and Sciences in recognition of excellence in American daytime television programming. Bill Nye the Science Guy has been nominated thirty-six times, winning nineteen.

Year	Category	Nominee(s)	Result	Ref(s)
1995	Outstanding Children's Series	James McKenna, Hamilton McCulloch, Erren Gottlieb, and Elizabeth Brock	Nominated	
1995	Outstanding Achievement in Single Camera Editing	Greg Day, Michael Gross, Darrell Suto	Nominated	
1996	Outstanding Children's Series	James McKenna, Hamilton McCulloch, Erren Gottlieb, and Elizabeth Brock	Nominated	
1996	Outstanding Achievement in Single Camera Editing	Greg Day, Michael Gross, Darrell Suto	Nominated	
1996	Outstanding Writing in a Children's Series	Erren Gottlieb, Bill Nye, James McKenna, Scott Schaefer, Adam Gross, Seth Gross	Won	
1996	Outstanding Sound Editing	Jim Wilson, Thomas McGurk, Michael McAuliffe, Dave Howe, Ella Brackett	Won	
1997	Outstanding Children's Series	Elizabeth Brock, James McKenna, Erren Gottlieb, Hamilton McCulloch, Bill Nye	Nominated	
1997	Outstanding Performer in a Children's Series	Bill Nye	Nominated	
1997	Outstanding Single Camera Photography	Michael Boydstun, Jennifer Moran, Peter Rummel, Arlo Smith, Tom Speer	Nominated	
1997	Outstanding Sound Mixing	Thomas McGurk, Michael McAuliffe, Dave Howe, Myron Partman, Resti Bagca	Nominated	
1997	Outstanding Directing in a Children's Series	Darrell Suto, Michael Gross, Erren Gottlieb, James McKenna	Won	
1997	Outstanding Writing in a Children's Series	Kit Boss, Erren Gottlieb, Michael Gross, James McKenna, Bill Nye, Ian G. Saunders, Scott Schaefer, Darrell Suto	Won	
1997	Outstanding Single Camera Editing	Darrell Suto, Michael Gross, Felicity Oram, John Reul	Won	
1997	Outstanding Sound Editing	Thomas McGurk, Michael McAuliffe, Dave Howe	Won	
1998	Outstanding Children's Series	James McKenna, Elizabeth Brock, Jamie Hammond, Hamilton McCulloch, Bill Nye	Nominated	
1998	Outstanding Directing in a Children's Series	Michael Gross, Darrell Suto, Erren Gottlieb, James McKenna	Nominated	
1998	Outstanding Performer in a Children's Series	Bill Nye	Won	
1998	Outstanding Achievement in Single Camera Editing	Darrell Suto, Michael Gross, Felicity Oram, John Reul	Won	
1998	Outstanding Sound Mixing	Dave Howe, Thomas McGurk, Michael McAuliffe, Bob O'Hern, Resti Bagcal, Marion Smith	Won	
1998	Outstanding Sound Editing	Dave Howe, Thomas McGurk, Michael McAuliffe	Won	
1998	Outstanding Writing in a Children's Series	Simon Griffith, Scott Schaefer, James McKenna, Darrell Suto, Michael Gross, Bill Nye, Lynn Brunelle, Ian G. Saunders, Erren Gottlieb, Kit Boss, Michael Palleschi	Won	
1999	Outstanding Performer in a Children's Series	Bill Nye	Nominated	
1999	Outstanding Lighting Direction	Donald E. Lange	Nominated	
1999	Outstanding Sound Mixing	Dave Howe, Thomas McGurk, Michael McAuliffe, Myron Partman, Resti Bagcal, Todd Schmidt, Marion Smith	Nominated	
1999	Outstanding Writing in a Children's Series	Bill Nye, James McKenna, Erren Gottlieb, Michael Gross, Darrell Suto, Ian G. Saunders, Michael Palleschi, Lynn Brunelle	Nominated	
1999	Outstanding Children's Series	Erren Gottlieb, James McKenna, Elizabeth Brock, Jamie Hammond, Hamilton McCulloch, Bill Nye	Won	
1999	Outstanding Directing in a Children's Series	Michael Gross, Darrell Suto	Won	
1999	Outstanding Single Camera Editing	Felicity Oram, John Reul, Michael Gross, Darrell Suto	Won	
1999	Outstanding Sound Editing	Dave Howe, Thomas McGurk, Michael McAuliffe	Won	
2000	Outstanding Directing in a Children's Series	Michael Gross, Darrell Suto, Mitchell Kriegman	Nominated	
2000	Outstanding Achievement in Single Camera Editing	Michael Gross, Darrell Suto, Felicity Oram, John Reul	Nominated	
2000	Outstanding Performer in a Children's Series	Bill Nye	Nominated	
2000	Outstanding Children's Series	James McKenna, Erren Gottlieb, Elizabeth Brock, Jamie Hammond, Bill Nye	Won	
2000	Outstanding Sound Editing	Dave Howe, Michael McAuliffe, Thomas McGurk	Won	
2000	Outstanding Sound Mixing	Dave Howe, Michael McAuliffe, Thomas McGurk, Myron Partman, Resti Bagcal	Won	
2000	Outstanding Writing in a Children's Series	Bill Nye, Michael Gross, Darrell Suto, Ian G. Saunders, Michael Palleschi, Lynn Brunelle, Mike Greene	Won	

== Environmental Media Awards ==
The Environmental Media Awards have been awarded by the Environmental Media Association since 1991 to the best television episode or film with an environmental message. Bill Nye the Science Guy has received four awards.

Year	Category	Nominee(s)	Result	Ref(s)
1994	Children's Television Program - Live Action	Series production staff; for episode: "Biodiversity"	Won	
1996	Children's Television Program - Live Action	Series production staff; for episode: "Wetlands"	Won	
1997	Children's Television Program - Live Action	Series production staff; for episode: "Pollution Solutions"	Won	
1998	Children's Television Program - Live Action	Series production staff; for episode: "Lakes & Ponds"	Won	

== National Science Board Public Service Awards ==
The National Science Board presents the Public Service Awards to recognize "outstanding science and engineering accomplishments". Bill Nye the Science Guy has won once.

Year	Category	Nominee(s)	Result	Ref(s)
1999	Awarded: "For its masterful presentations of the sciences to the younger generation, thus encouraging and fostering an awareness and appreciation of science and technology."	Elizabeth Brock, Erren Gottlieb, James McKenna and Bill Nye	Won	

== Parents' Choice Awards ==
Parents' Choice Awards is an award presented by the non-profit Parents' Choice Foundation to recognize "the very best products for children of different ages and backgrounds, and of varied skill and interest levels." It is considered a "prestigious" award among children's products, and has been described as the industry equivalent of an Academy Award. Bill Nye the Science Guy has received three awards.

Year	Category	Nominee(s)	Result	Ref(s)
2009	Parents' Choice Silver Honor	Disney Educational Productions; for DVD: Safety Smart Science With Bill Nye the Science Guy: Electricity	Won	
2012	Parents' Choice Gold Award	Disney Educational Productions; for DVD: Safety Smart Science: Germs and Your Health	Won	
2013	Parents' Choice Gold Award	Disney Educational Productions;	Won	

== TCA Awards ==
The TCA Awards are awards presented by the Television Critics Association in recognition of excellence in television, specifically those programs which are innovative and devoid of outside influence. Bill Nye the Science Guy has won one award out of two nominations.

Year	Category	Nominee(s)	Result	Ref(s)
1994	Outstanding Achievement in Children's Programming	Bill Nye the Science Guy production staff	Nominated	
1997	Outstanding Achievement in Children's Programming	Series production staff; award was shared with Wishbone.	Won	

== Young Artist Awards ==
The Young Artist Awards is an accolade bestowed by the Young Artist Association, a non-profit organization founded in 1978 to honor excellence of youth performers. Bill Nye the Science Guy has received three nominations, with one win.

Year	Category	Nominee(s)	Result	Ref(s)
1995	Best Performance by a Youth Actress - TV Guest Star	Ivyann Schwan	Nominated	
1998	Best Educational TV Show	Series production staff	Nominated	
2004	Social Relations of Knowledge Institute Award	Series production staff	Won	

== See also ==
- The Eyes of Nye
- Stuff Happens
- Universe of Energy – an attraction at Walt Disney World's Epcot starring Bill Nye.
