= 25th Daytime Emmy Awards =

- Date: May 15, 1998
- Location: Radio City Music Hall, New York City
- Presented by: National Academy of Television Arts and Sciences
- Hosted by: Leeza Gibbons; Peter Reckell; Joe Barbara; Jason George

Highlights
- Outstanding Drama Series: All My Children
- Outstanding Game Show: Jeopardy!

Television/radio coverage
- Network: NBC

The 25th Daytime Emmy Awards were held in 1998 to commemorate excellence in daytime programming from the previous year (1997).

Winners in each category are in bold. Just like the previous year, the 25th Daytime Emmy Awards were held at Radio City Music Hall in New York City.

== Outstanding Drama Series ==
- **All My Children**
- Days of Our Lives
- General Hospital
- The Young and the Restless

== Outstanding Lead Actor ==
- Peter Bergman (Jack Abbott, The Young and the Restless)
- **Eric Braeden** (**Victor Newman**, The Young and the Restless)
- David Canary (Adam Chandler/Stuart Chandler, All My Children)
- Anthony Geary (Luke Spencer, General Hospital)
- Kin Shriner (Scott Baldwin, Port Charles)

== Outstanding Lead Actress ==
- Eileen Davidson (Kristen Blake, Days of Our Lives)
- Susan Lucci (Erica Kane, All My Children)
- **Cynthia Watros** (Annie Dutton, Guiding Light)
- Jacklyn Zeman (Bobbie Spencer, General Hospital)
- Kim Zimmer (Reva Shayne, Guiding Light)

== Outstanding Supporting Actor ==
- Grant Aleksander (Phillip Spaulding, Guiding Light)
- Ian Buchanan (James Warwick, The Bold and the Beautiful)
- **Steve Burton** (Jason Morgan, General Hospital)
- Michael E. Knight (Tad Martin, All My Children)
- Scott Reeves (Ryan McNeil, The Young and the Restless)

== Outstanding Supporting Actress ==
- **Julia Barr** (Brooke English, All My Children)
- Amy Carlson (Josie Watts, Another World)
- Amy Ecklund (Abigail Blume, Guiding Light)
- Vanessa Marcil (Brenda Barrett, General Hospital)
- Victoria Rowell (Drucilla Winters, The Young and the Restless)

== Outstanding Younger Actor ==
- Jensen Ackles (Eric Brady, Days of Our Lives)
- Tyler Christopher (Nikolas Cassadine, General Hospital)
- **Jonathan Jackson** (Lucky Spencer, General Hospital)
- Bryant Jones (Nate Hastings, The Young and the Restless)
- Kevin Mambo (Marcus Williams, Guiding Light)
- Joshua Morrow (Nicholas Newman, The Young and the Restless)

== Outstanding Younger Actress ==
- **Sarah Brown** (Carly Benson, General Hospital)
- Christie Clark (Carrie Brady, Days of Our Lives)
- Camryn Grimes (Cassie Newman, The Young and the Restless)
- Rhonda Ross Kendrick (Toni Burrell, Another World)
- Heather Tom (Victoria Newman, The Young and the Restless)

== Outstanding Drama Series Writing Team ==
- **All My Children**
- Days of Our Lives
- General Hospital
- The Young and the Restless

== Outstanding Drama Series Directing Team ==
- All My Children
- Days of Our Lives
- General Hospital
- **The Young and the Restless**

== Outstanding Talk Show ==
- Leeza: Leeza Gibbons, Donna Harrison, Rudy Guido, Jill Mullikin-Bates, Kathy Giaconia, Shantel Klinger, Julie Laughlin, Tracy Mazuer, Julie Ross, Marilyn Zielinski
- Live with Regis & Kathie Lee: Michael Gelman, Delores Spruell-Jackson, Joanne Saltzman, Barbara Fight, Cindy MacDonald, David Mullen, Dana Dodge, Mariann Sabol-Nieves
- The Oprah Winfrey Show: Dianne Atkinson Hudson, Oprah Winfrey, David Boul, Alice McGee, Dana Newton, Ellen Rakieten, Mollie Allen, Kandi Amelon, Amy Craig, Katy Murphy Davis, Angie Kraus, Laura Grant Sillars, Jill Van Lokeren
- **The Rosie O'Donnell Show**: Rosie O'Donnell, Hilary Estey McLoughlin, Bernie Young, Andy Lassner, Mimi Pizzi, David Perler, Dierdre Dod, Lisa Rechsteiner, Corin Nelson, Judy Gold, Joy Trapani, Janette Barber, Krysia Plonka
- The View: Bill Geddie, Barbara Walters, Jessica Stedman Guff, Roni Selig, Rebecca Biderman, Allison Kluger, Sue Podbielski, Alexandra Cohen, Donald Berman, Sue Solomon, Erin Saxton, Mindy Moore, William Kearney, Ann Marie Williams Gray, Jakki Taylor

== Outstanding Game Show ==
- **Jeopardy!**
- Pictionary
- Win Ben Stein's Money
- Wheel of Fortune
- The Price is Right

== Outstanding Game Show Host ==
- **Pat Sajak** (Wheel of Fortune)
- Bob Barker (The Price is Right)
- Alex Trebek (Jeopardy!)

== Outstanding Service Show ==
- **The Pet Department — Rickie Gaffney, executive producer; Teresa Pawlowski, producer (FX).**
- Martha Stewart Living — Martha Stewart, executive producer; Carolyn Kelly, senior producer; Brook Altman, producer (syn).
- The New Yankee Workshop — Russell Morash, executive producer (PBS).
- Newton’s Apple — Richard Hudson, Lee Carey, executive producers; Kristian Berg, Lisa Blackstone, Jeff Nielsen, Erin Rasmussen, Kevin Williams, producers (PBS).
- This Old House — Russell Morash, executive producer; Bruce Irving, producer (PBS).

== Outstanding Children's Special ==
- **Louis Gossett Jr., Hillard Elkins, Dan Redler and Patrick Whitley (In His Father's Shoes)**
- Helen Holt and Jeanine Isabel Butler (Assignment Discovery: The Science of HIV)
- Sheila Nevins, Susan Hannah Hadary and William A. Whiteford (Bong & Donnell)
- Carlyle Kyzer (Letters from Africa)
- Paula Connelly Skorka, Howard Meltzer, Frank Doelger and Jonathan Stern (The Royale)

== Outstanding Performer in a Children's Special ==
- **Robert Ri'chard (Clay Crosby, In His Father's Shoes)**

== Outstanding Performer In An Animated Program ==
- **Louie Anderson (Louis Anderson and Andy Anderson, Life with Louie)**
- Robin Williams (Genie, Great Minds Think for Themselves)
- Lily Tomlin (Valerie Felicity Frizzle, The Magic School Bus)
- Maurice LaMarche (Brain, Pinky and the Brain)
- Rob Paulsen (Pinky, Pinky and the Brain)

== Outstanding Music Direction and Composition ==
- **Richard Stone, Steven Bernstein, Julie Bernstein, and Gordon Goodwin (Animaniacs)**
- Charles Fernandez Ron Grant, Harvey Cohen and Bruce Babcock (The Spooktacular New Adventures of Casper)
- Julie Bernstein, Steven Bernstein, Richard Stone, Tim Kelly, Carl Johnson (Pinky and the Brain)
- John McDaniel (The Rosie O'Donnell Show)
- Shirley Walker (The Batman Superman Movie: World's Finest)

== Outstanding Children's Animated Program ==
- **Micheline Charest, Carol Greenwald, Ronald A. Weinberg, Cassandra Schafhausen, Lesley Taylor, Ken Scarborough, Joe Fallon, Peter K. Hirsch and Greg Bailey (Arthur)**
- Liz Holzman, Wendell Morris, Jed Spingarn, Nelson Recinos, Kirk Tingblad, Charles Visser, Andrea Romano, Steven Spielberg, Russell Calabrese, Earl Kress, Mike Milo, Tom Ruegger, Charles M. Howell IV, Rusty Mills, Tom Sheppard (Pinky and the Brain)
- David Campbell, Tony Craig, Roberts Gannaway, Cydne Clark, Steve Granat, Carin Greenberg Baker, Martha Ripp, Ken Boyer, Victor Cook, Skip Jones, Rick Schneider, Peter Ferk, Don Gillies, Ken Koonce, Michael Merton and Bruce Shelly (101 Dalmatians: The Series)
- Steven Spielberg, Tom Ruegger, Rusty Mills, Liz Holzman, Andrea Romano, Mike Milo, Jon McClenahan, Charles M. Howell IV, Randy Rogel, Kevin Hopps, Gordon Bressack, Nick Dubois and Tom Minton (Animaniacs)
- Kristin Laskas Martin, Karen Stevens, Jocelyn Stevenson, George Arthur Bloom, Vince Commisso, Larry Jacobs and Susan Blu (The Magic School Bus)

== Outstanding Special Class Animated Program ==
- **Jean MacCurdy, Alan Burnett, Paul Dini, Bruce W. Timm, Hilary Bader, Stan Berkowitz, Rich Fogel, Steve Gerber, Bob Goodman, Hiroyuki Aoyama, Curt Geda, Kenji Hachizaki, Butch Lukic, Toshihiko Masuda, Dan Riba, Andrea Romano and Yuichiro Yano (The New Batman/Superman Adventures)**
- Gary Katona, Ed Wexler, Lance Khazei, Mark McCorkle, Robert Schooley, Michael Karnow, and Gary Sperling (Great Minds Think for Themselves)
- Jean MacCurdy, Tom Minton, James T. Walker, Tim Cahill, Julie McNally Cahill, Karl Toerge, Andrea Romano, and Al Zegler (The Sylvester & Tweety Mysteries)
- Andy Heyward, Michael Maliani, Robby London, Christopher Hallowell, Eddie Fitzgerald, Mike Fontanelli, Janice Sonski, Daniël Shwall, Christian Choquet, Marsha Goodman, Paul F. Quinn, Lisa Schaffer, Jeffrey Scott, Henry Gilroy, and Jymn Magon (The Wacky World of Tex Avery)

== Outstanding Writing in a Children's Series ==
- **Erren Gottlieb, James McKenna, Bill Nye, Michael Gross, Darrell Suto, Scott Schaefer, Kit Boss, Lynn Brunelle, Michael Palleschi, Ian G. Saunders, and Simon Griffith (Bill Nye the Science Guy)**
- **Molly Boylan, Lou Berger, Sara Compton, Annie Evans, Christine Ferraro, Judy Freudberg, Tony Geiss, Ian Ellis James, Emily Perl Kingsley, David Korr, Sonia Manzano, Joey Mazzarino, Jeff Moss, Cathi Turow, Adam Rudman, Nancy Sans, Luis Santeiro, Josh Selig, Belinda Ward, John Weidman, and Mo Willems (Sesame Street)**
- Fred Rogers (Mister Rogers' Neighborhood)
- Linda Ellerbee, and Walt McGraw (Nick News with Linda Ellerbee)
- Ronnie Krauss, Jill Gluckson, Billy Aronson, and McPaul Smith (Reading Rainbow)

== Outstanding Performer in a Children's Series ==
- **Bill Nye (Bill Nye the Science Guy)**
- Fred Rogers (Mister Rogers' Neighborhood)
- LeVar Burton (Reading Rainbow)
- Caroll Spinney (Sesame Street)
- Lynne Thigpen (Where in Time is Carmen Sandiego?)

== Outstanding Sound Editing ==
- **Dave Howe, Thomas McGurk, Michael McAuliffe (Bill Nye the Science Guy)**
- Anna MacKenzie, Rick Hinson, Ray Spiess, William H. Angarola, Mark Cleary, Mike Marchain, Cindy Rabideau and Robert Guastini (Crayola Kids Adventures)
- Denise Brady, Anna MacKenzie, Mike Marchain, William H. Angarola, Raymond E. Spiess III, Cindy Rabideau, Ray Spiess and Robert Guastini (Flipper)
- Kurt Wagner (A Magical Walt Disney World Christmas)

== Outstanding Sound Editing - Special Class ==
- **Thomas Syslo, Timothy Borquez, Eric Freeman, Rick Hammel, Les Wolf and Marc Mailand (The Angry Beavers)**
- Dick Maitland, Bob Schott and David Browning (Sesame Street)
- Eric Freeman, Timothy Borquez and Rick Hinson (Life with Louie)
- Diane Griffen, John Hegedes, George Brooks, Kelly Ann Foley, Gregory Beaumont, Mark Keatts and Robert Hargreaves (The New Batman Adventures)
- Eric Hertsguaard, Melissa Ellis, Brian F. Mars, Kenneth Young, David Lynch, Marc S. Perlman, Robert Duran, William Griggs, Robert Poole II, Charles Rychwalski, Kris Daly, Dominick Certo, Jorge Riesenfeld, Bill Kean and Jennifer Mertens (101 Dalmatians: The Series)

== Outstanding Sound Mixing ==
- **Dave Howe, Thomas McGurk, Michael McAuliffe, Bob O'Hern, Resti Bagcal, Marion Smith (Bill Nye the Science Guy)**
- Gary Gossett, Todd Orr, Jon Taylor and Kevin Patrick Burns (Crayola Kids Adventures)
- Ron Balentine, Gary French and David M. Boothe (Barney & Friends)
- Todd Orr, Kevin Patrick Burns and Jon Taylor (Flipper)
- John Badenhop and Robert L. Manahan (Beakman's World)

== Outstanding Sound Mixing - Special Class ==
- **Dick Maitland and Blake Norton (Sesame Street)**
- Benoît Coaillier, Pierre L'Abbé, Julian Fischer, Pierre Bourcier, John Nestorowich and Alain Roy (Arthur)
- Michael Beiriger, Ray Leonard and Deb Adair (Recess)
- Melissa Ellis, Michael Beiriger, Fil Brown, Ray Leonard, Michael Jiron, Allen L. Stone and Deb Adair (101 Dalmatians: The Series)
- Timothy Borquez, Timothy J. Garrity and Brad Brock (Life with Louie)
- Timothy Borquez and Timothy J. Garrity (The Angry Beavers)
- Timothy Borquez, Timothy J. Garrity and Deb Adair (Bobby's World)

== Outstanding Single Camera Editing ==
- **Darrell Suto, Michael Gross, Felicity Oram, John Reul (Bill Nye the Science Guy)**
- Richard A. Fernandes (Reading Rainbow)
- Tim Warner, Michael Coleman and Julia Dunn (Wishbone)
- Bill Howe (This Old House)
- Barry Rubinow, Randy Littlejohn and Mark Walters (Beakman's World)

== Outstanding Children's Series ==
- **Reading Rainbow**
- Beakman's World
- Bill Nye the Science Guy
- Nick News with Linda Ellerbee
- Where in Time Is Carmen Sandiego?

== Lifetime achievement award ==
- **Oprah Winfrey**
