= 26th Daytime Emmy Awards =

- Date: May 21, 1999 (Ceremony); May 15 (Creative Arts Awards)
- Location: The Theater, Madison Square Garden, New York City
- Presented by: National Academy of Television Arts and Sciences
- Hosted by: Oprah Winfrey

Highlights
- Outstanding Drama Series: General Hospital
- Outstanding Game Show: Win Ben Stein's Money

Television/radio coverage
- Network: CBS

The 26th Daytime Emmy Awards were held in 1999 to commemorate excellence in daytime television programming from the previous year (1998). The main ceremonies were held May 21, 1999, at The Theater in Madison Square Garden in New York City and were televised live by CBS. Memorable moments that occurred at the ceremonies included the ABC soap opera General Hospital winning a record number of Daytime Emmys with a total of eight, and Susan Lucci's first-ever win in the Outstanding Lead Actress category after losing a total of 18 times. Winners in each category are in bold.

== Outstanding Drama Series ==
- All My Children: Jean Dadario Burke
- Days of Our Lives: Ken Corday
- **General Hospital**: Wendy Riche
- The Young and the Restless: William J. Bell & Edward Scott

== Outstanding Lead Actor ==
- Peter Bergman (Jack Abbott, The Young and the Restless)
- Eric Braeden (Victor Newman, The Young and the Restless)
- David Canary (Adam Chandler/Stuart Chandler, All My Children)
- **Anthony Geary** (Luke Spencer, General Hospital)
- Robert S. Woods (Bo Buchanan, One Life to Live)

== Outstanding Lead Actress ==
- Jeanne Cooper (Katherine Chancellor, The Young and the Restless)
- Elizabeth Hubbard (Lucinda Walsh, As the World Turns)
- **Susan Lucci** (Erica Kane, All My Children)
- Melody Thomas Scott (Nikki Newman, The Young and the Restless)
- Kim Zimmer (Reva Shayne, Guiding Light)

== Outstanding Supporting Actor ==
- **Stuart Damon** (Alan Quartermaine, General Hospital)
- Michael E. Knight (Tad Martin, All My Children)
- Christian LeBlanc (Michael Baldwin, The Young and the Restless)
- Kristoff St. John (Neil Winters, The Young and the Restless)
- Jerry verDorn (Ross Marler, Guiding Light)

== Outstanding Supporting Actress ==
- Jennifer Bassey (Marian Colby, All My Children)
- **Sharon Case** (Sharon Newman, The Young and the Restless)
- Beth Ehlers (Harley Cooper, Guiding Light)
- Kathleen Noone (Bette Katzenkazrahi, Sunset Beach)
- Kelly Ripa (Hayley Vaughan, All My Children)

== Outstanding Younger Actor ==
- Jensen Ackles (Eric Brady, Days of Our Lives)
- Jason Winston George (Michael Bourne, Sunset Beach)
- **Jonathan Jackson** (Lucky Spencer, General Hospital)
- Bryant Jones (Nate Hastings, The Young and the Restless)
- Joshua Morrow (Nicholas Newman, The Young and the Restless)
- Jacob Young (Rick Forrester, The Bold and the Beautiful)

== Outstanding Younger Actress ==
- Sarah Brown (Carly Benson, General Hospital)
- Camryn Grimes (Cassie Newman, The Young and the Restless)
- Rebecca Herbst (Elizabeth Webber, General Hospital)
- Ashley Jones (Megan Dennison, The Young and the Restless)
- Sherri Saum (Vanessa Hart, Sunset Beach)
- **Heather Tom** (Victoria Newman, The Young and the Restless)

== Outstanding Drama Series Writing Team ==
- All My Children
- Days of Our Lives
- **General Hospital**
- Guiding Light
- The Young and the Restless

== Outstanding Drama Series Directing Team ==
- All My Children
- Days of Our Lives
- General Hospital
- **The Young and the Restless**

== Outstanding Music Direction and Composition ==
- **Richard Stone, Steven Bernstein, Tim Kelly, Julie Bernstein and Gordon Goodwin (Animaniacs)**
- Bruce Babcock, Harvey Cohen, Charles Fernandez, Ron Grant and Thom Sharp (The Spooktacular New Adventures of Casper)
- Mark Watters (The Lionhearts)
- Shirley Walker (The New Batman Adventures – "Legend of the Dark Night")
- Lolita Ritmanis (The New Batman Adventures – "Little Girl Lost: Part 1")
- Michael McCuistion (The New Batman Adventures – "Judgement Day")
- Robby Merkin, Danny Epstein, Dave Conner, Christopher Cerf, Sarah Durkee, Tony Geiss, Gail Sky King, Stephen J. Lawrence, Jeff Moss and Paul Jacobs (Sesame Street)
- Julie Bernstein, Steven Bernstein, Tim Kelly and Gordon Goodwin (Pinky and the Brain)

== Outstanding Sound Mixing – Special Class ==
- **Tom Maydeck, Robert Hargreaves, Pat Rodman and John Hegedes (The New Batman/Superman Adventures)**
- Benoît Coaillier and Jean Christophe Verbert (Arthur)
- Dick Maitland and Blake Norton (Sesame Street)
- Tom Maydeck and Pat Rodman (Pinky, Elmyra & the Brain)

== Outstanding Sound Editing ==
- **Dave Howe, Thomas McGurk and Michael McAuliffe (Bill Nye, the Science Guy)**
- Christopher Harvengt, Kim Naves, James A. Williams, Jason W. Jennings and Tiffany S. Griffith (Honey, I Shrunk the Kids: The TV Show)
- Neil Cedar (The Wubbulous World of Dr. Seuss)
- Tim Isle and George Haddad (Young Hercules)
- David Appleby, Tim O'Connell, Todd Beckett and Tony Van den Akker (Galileo: On the Shoulders of Giants)
- Yuri Reese, George Haddad and Dick Hansen (Young Hercules)

== Outstanding Single-Camera Editing ==
- **Felicity Oram, John Reul, Michael Gross and Darrell Suto (Bill Nye, the Science Guy)**
- Jeff Warren, Mike Lee and Rik Morden (Edison: The Wizard of Light)
- Gary Stephenson (The New Yankee Workshop)
- Dena Mermelstein, Juantxo Royo, Douglas Schuetz and Steve Pequignot (Reading Rainbow)
- Bill Howe (This Old House)

== Outstanding Game Show ==
- Hollywood Squares
- Jeopardy!
- Wheel of Fortune
- The Price is Right
- **Win Ben Stein's Money**

== Outstanding Game Show Host ==
- **Ben Stein & Jimmy Kimmel** (Win Ben Stein's Money)
- Bob Barker (The Price is Right)
- Tom Bergeron (Hollywood Squares)
- Pat Sajak (Wheel of Fortune)
- Alex Trebek (Jeopardy!)

== Outstanding Children's Series ==
- **Erren Gottlieb, James McKenna, Elizabeth Brock, Jamie Hammond, Hamilton McCulloch and Bill Nye (Bill Nye, the Science Guy)**
- Brian Henson, Jocelyn Stevenson and Joan O'Connor (Jim Henson's Animal Show)
- Linda Ellerbee, Rolfe Tessem, Wally Berger and Mark Lyons (Nick News with Linda Ellerbee)
- Twila Liggett, LeVar Burton, Tony Buttino, Cecily Truett, Larry Lancit, Orly Wiseman, Stacey Raider and Ed Wiseman (Reading Rainbow)

== Outstanding Directing for a Children's Series ==
- **Michael Gross and Darrell Suto (Bill Nye, the Science Guy)**
- Steve Feldman, Fred Holmes and Jim Rowley (Barney & Friends)
- Alan Zdinak and Paul Zehrer (Blue's Clues)
- Ed Wiseman, Larry Lancit and Mark Mannucci (Reading Rainbow)
- Lisa Simon, Emily Squires, Ted May, Steve Feldman, Reggie Life and Victor DiNapoli (Sesame Street)

== Outstanding Children's Animated Program ==
- **Arthur**
- 101 Dalmatians: The Series
- Doug
- Animaniacs
- Pinky, Elmyra, and the Brain

== Outstanding Special Class Animated Program ==
- **Steven Spielberg, Tom Ruegger, Rusty Mills, Liz Holzman, Charles M. Howell, Gordon Bressack, Jed Spingarn, Wendell Morris, Tom Sheppard, Earl Kress, Andrea Romano, Russell Calabrese, Kirk Tingblad, Mike Milo, Nelson Recinos and Charles Visser (Pinky and the Brain)**
- Peter Hastings, Prudence Fenton, Matthew Knox, John A. Smith, Bryan Evans and Scott M. Gimple (One Saturday Morning – How Things Werk)
- William Joyce, Michael Hirsh, Patrick Loubert, Clive A. Smith, Fabrice Giger, Corinne Kouper, Pamela Slavin, D. Scott Dyer, Guillaume Hellouin, Stephen Hodgins, Patricia R. Burns, Mike Fallows, Peter Sauder and Ben Joseph (Rolie Polie Olie)
- Louie Anderson, Ahmos Hassan, Thomas L. Wilhite, Willard Carroll, Matthew O'Callaghan, Russell P. Marleau, John Lanza and Bert Ring (Life with Louie)
- Jean MacCurdy, Alan Burnett, Paul Dini, Glen Murakami, Bruce Timm, Hilary Bader, Stan Berkowitz, Rich Fogel, Bob Goodman, Hiroyuki Aoyama, Curt Geda, Kenji Hachizaki, Butch Lukic, Toshihiko Masuda, Dan Riba, Andrea Romano and Yuichiro Yano (The New Batman/Superman Adventures)
- Jean MacCurdy, Tom Minton, James T. Walker, John Behnke, Rob Humphrey, Jim Peterson, Karl Toerge, Andrea Romano, Charles Visser and Al Zegler (The Sylvester & Tweety Mysteries)

== Outstanding Performer in an Animated Program ==
- **Rob Paulsen (Pinky, Pinky and the Brain)**
- Dom DeLuise (Itchy Itchiford, All Dogs Go to Heaven: The Series)
- Ernest Borgnine (Carface Caruthers, All Dogs Go to Heaven: The Series)
- Louie Anderson (Louie Anderson and Andy Anderson, Life with Louie)
- Jeffrey Tambor (Hank, The Lionhearts)

== Outstanding Makeup ==
- **Anna Lujan, Chanty La Grana and Keith Crary (Leeza)**
- Richard Penna and Gina Riggi (Sally Jessy Raphael Show)

== Lifetime achievement award ==
- **Bob Barker**
