= Daytime Emmy Award for Outstanding Children's Animated Program =

Former television voice acting award

- Awarded for: Outstanding Children's Animated Program
- Country: United States
- Presented by: Academy of Television Arts & Sciences
- First award: 1985
- Final award: 2021

Highlights
- Most awards: Arthur (4); Muppet Babies (4)
- Most nominations: Arthur (12)
- Website: theemmys.tv

The Daytime Emmy Award for Outstanding Children's Animated Program had been awarded annually between 1985 and 2021. Until 1993, the award was just known as the Daytime Emmy Award for Outstanding Animated Program. Arthur held the record for most nominations (12) and Arthur and Muppet Babies tied for most wins (4). Nickelodeon had the most awards of any television network (9).

Typically five nominees were announced. An exception was the 2006 ceremony, where six nominees were announced. At the 2010 ceremony, four nominees were announced. The last time this had occurred was two decades prior in 1990 and 1985, the first time the award was handed out. TV specials had been known to appear on the list, as well as shows appearing at multiple years, despite having lasted only one season.

In November 2021, it was announced that all Daytime Emmy categories honoring children's programming would be retired in favor of a separate Children's and Family Emmy Awards ceremony that was held starting in 2022.

== 1980s ==
| Year | Program | Network | Ref |
|---|---|---|---|
1985 (12th)
| 1985 (12th) | Muppet Babies | CBS | |
| 1985 (12th) | Alvin and the Chipmunks | NBC | |
| 1985 (12th) | Fat Albert and the Cosby Kids | Syndicated | |
| 1985 (12th) | The Smurfs | NBC | |
1986 (13th)
| 1986 (13th) | Muppet Babies | CBS | |
| 1986 (13th) | CBS Storybreak | CBS | |
| 1986 (13th) | The Charlie Brown and Snoopy Show | CBS | |
| 1986 (13th) | Fat Albert and the Cosby Kids | Syndicated | |
| 1986 (13th) | The Smurfs | NBC | |
1987 (14th)
| 1987 (14th) | Muppet Babies | CBS | |
| 1987 (14th) | Alvin and the Chipmunks | NBC | |
| 1987 (14th) | Disney's Adventures of the Gummi Bears | NBC | |
| 1987 (14th) | It's Punky Brewster | NBC | |
| 1987 (14th) | The Smurfs | NBC | |
1988 (15th)
| 1988 (15th) | Muppet Babies | CBS | |
| 1988 (15th) | Alvin and the Chipmunks | NBC | |
| 1988 (15th) | CBS Storybreak | CBS | |
| 1988 (15th) | DuckTales | Syndicated | |
| 1988 (15th) | The Smurfs | NBC | |
1989 (16th)
| 1989 (16th) | The New Adventures of Winnie the Pooh | ABC | |
| 1989 (16th) | A Pup Named Scooby-Doo | ABC | |
| 1989 (16th) | DuckTales | Syndicated | |
| 1989 (16th) | Muppet Babies | CBS | |
| 1989 (16th) | The Smurfs | NBC | |

== 1990s ==
| Year | Program | Network | Ref |
|---|---|---|---|
1990 (17th)
| 1990 (17th) | Beetlejuice (tie) | ABC | |
| 1990 (17th) | The New Adventures of Winnie the Pooh (tie) | ABC | |
| 1990 (17th) | A Pup Named Scooby-Doo | ABC | |
| 1990 (17th) | Chip 'n Dale Rescue Rangers | Syndicated | |
1991 (18th)
| 1991 (18th) | Tiny Toon Adventures | Syndicated | |
| 1991 (18th) | Bobby's World | Fox | |
| 1991 (18th) | Captain Planet and the Planeteers | TBS | |
| 1991 (18th) | Garfield and Friends | CBS | |
| 1991 (18th) | The Real Ghostbusters | Syndicated, ABC | |
1992 (19th)
| 1992 (19th) | Rugrats | Nickelodeon | |
| 1992 (19th) | Darkwing Duck | Syndication, ABC | |
| 1992 (19th) | Doug | Nickelodeon | |
| 1992 (19th) | The New Adventures of Winnie the Pooh | ABC | |
| 1992 (19th) | Tiny Toon Adventures | Syndicated | |
1993 (20th)
| 1993 (20th) | Tiny Toon Adventures | Fox | |
| 1993 (20th) | Batman: The Animated Series | Fox | |
| 1993 (20th) | Darkwing Duck | ABC | |
| 1993 (20th) | Doug | Nickelodeon | |
| 1993 (20th) | Rugrats | Nickelodeon | |
1994 (21st)
| 1994 (21st) | Rugrats | Nickelodeon | |
| 1994 (21st) | Animaniacs | Fox | |
| 1994 (21st) | Batman: The Animated Series | Fox | |
| 1994 (21st) | The Halloween Tree | Syndication | |
| 1994 (21st) | Where on Earth Is Carmen Sandiego?: The Stolen Smile | Fox | |
1995 (22nd)
| 1995 (22nd) | Where on Earth Is Carmen Sandiego? | Fox | |
| 1995 (22nd) | Animaniacs | Fox | |
| 1995 (22nd) | Aladdin | Syndication, CBS | |
| 1995 (22nd) | The Little Mermaid | CBS | |
| 1995 (22nd) | Rugrats | Nickelodeon | |
1996 (23rd)
| 1996 (23rd) | Animaniacs | Kids' WB | |
| 1996 (23rd) | The Magic School Bus | PBS | |
| 1996 (23rd) | The New Adventures of Madeline | ABC | |
| 1996 (23rd) | Schoolhouse Rock! | ABC | |
| 1996 (23rd) | Where on Earth Is Carmen Sandiego? | Fox | |
1997 (24th)
| 1997 (24th) | Animaniacs | Kids' WB | |
| 1997 (24th) | The Magic School Bus | PBS | |
| 1997 (24th) | Pinky and the Brain | Kids' WB | |
| 1997 (24th) | Schoolhouse Rock! | ABC | |
| 1997 (24th) | Where on Earth Is Carmen Sandiego? | Kids' WB | |
1998 (25th)
| 1998 (25th) | Arthur | PBS | |
| 1998 (25th) | 101 Dalmatians: The Series | Syndication, ABC | |
| 1998 (25th) | Animaniacs | Kids' WB | |
| 1998 (25th) | The Magic School Bus | PBS | |
| 1998 (25th) | Pinky and the Brain | Kids' WB | |
1999 (26th)
| 1999 (26th) | Arthur | PBS | |
| 1999 (26th) | 101 Dalmatians: The Series | Syndication, ABC | |
| 1999 (26th) | Animaniacs | Kids' WB | |
| 1999 (26th) | Doug | ABC | |
| 1999 (26th) | Pinky, Elmyra & the Brain | Kids' WB | |

== 2000s ==
| Year | Program | Network | Ref |
|---|---|---|---|
2000 (27th)
| 2000 (27th) | Pinky, Elmyra & the Brain | Kids' WB | |
| 2000 (27th) | Arthur | PBS | |
| 2000 (27th) | Doug | ABC | |
| 2000 (27th) | Little Bear | Nickelodeon | |
| 2000 (27th) | The New Batman/Superman Adventures | Kids' WB | |
2001 (28th)
| 2001 (28th) | Arthur | PBS | |
| 2001 (28th) | Clifford the Big Red Dog | PBS | |
| 2001 (28th) | Dragon Tales | PBS | |
| 2001 (28th) | Madeline | Disney Channel | |
| 2001 (28th) | The Wild Thornberrys | Nickelodeon | |
2002 (29th)
| 2002 (29th) | Madeline | Disney Channel | |
| 2002 (29th) | Arthur | PBS | |
| 2002 (29th) | Clifford the Big Red Dog | PBS | |
| 2002 (29th) | Dora the Explorer | Nick Jr. | |
| 2002 (29th) | Dragon Tales | PBS | |
2003 (30th)
| 2003 (30th) | Rugrats | Nickelodeon | |
| 2003 (30th) | Arthur | PBS | |
| 2003 (30th) | Clifford the Big Red Dog | PBS | |
| 2003 (30th) | Dora the Explorer | Nick Jr. | |
| 2003 (30th) | Dragon Tales | PBS | |
2004 (31st)
| 2004 (31st) | Little Bill | Nick Jr. | |
| 2004 (31st) | Arthur | PBS | |
| 2004 (31st) | Dora the Explorer | Nick Jr. | |
| 2004 (31st) | Kim Possible | Disney Channel | |
| 2004 (31st) | Rugrats | Nickelodeon | |
2005 (32nd)
| 2005 (32nd) | Peep and the Big Wide World | TLC | |
| 2005 (32nd) | Arthur | PBS | |
| 2005 (32nd) | Dora the Explorer | Nick Jr. | |
| 2005 (32nd) | Kim Possible | Disney Channel | |
| 2005 (32nd) | ToddWorld | TLC | |
2006 (33rd)
| 2006 (33rd) | Jakers! The Adventures of Piggley Winks | PBS | |
| 2006 (33rd) | Arthur | PBS | |
| 2006 (33rd) | Baby Looney Tunes | Cartoon Network | |
| 2006 (33rd) | Dora the Explorer | Nickelodeon | |
| 2006 (33rd) | Peep and the Big Wide World | Discovery Kids | |
| 2006 (33rd) | ToddWorld | Discovery Kids | |
2007 (34th)
| 2007 (34th) | Arthur | PBS | |
| 2007 (34th) | Curious George | PBS | |
| 2007 (34th) | Time Warp Trio | NBC | |
| 2007 (34th) | Peep and the Big Wide World | Discovery Kids | |
| 2007 (34th) | ToddWorld | Discovery Kids | |
2008 (35th)
| 2008 (35th) | Curious George | PBS | |
| 2008 (35th) | Arthur | PBS | |
| 2008 (35th) | Charlie and Lola | Disney Channel | |
| 2008 (35th) | Little Einsteins | Disney Channel | |
| 2008 (35th) | Peep and the Big Wide World | Discovery Kids | |
2009 (36th)
| 2009 (36th) | WordWorld | PBS | |
| 2009 (36th) | The Backyardigans | Nick Jr. | |
| 2009 (36th) | Curious George | PBS | |
| 2009 (36th) | Little Einsteins | Disney Channel | |
| 2009 (36th) | Sid the Science Kid | PBS | |

== 2010s ==
| Year | Program | Network | Ref |
|---|---|---|---|
2010 (37th)
| 2010 (37th) | Curious George | PBS | |
| 2010 (37th) | The Backyardigans | Nickelodeon | |
| 2010 (37th) | Sid the Science Kid | PBS | |
| 2010 (37th) | WordGirl | PBS | |
2011 (38th)
| 2011 (38th) | The Penguins of Madagascar | Nickelodeon | |
| 2011 (38th) | The Backyardigans | Nickelodeon | |
| 2011 (38th) | Curious George | PBS | |
| 2011 (38th) | Dinosaur Train | PBS | |
| 2011 (38th) | Sid the Science Kid | PBS | |
2012 (39th)
| 2012 (39th) | The Penguins of Madagascar | Nickelodeon | |
| 2012 (39th) | Curious George | PBS | |
| 2012 (39th) | Kung Fu Panda: Legends of Awesomeness | Nickelodeon | |
| 2012 (39th) | Peep and the Big Wide World | PBS | |
| 2012 (39th) | Sid the Science Kid | PBS | |
| 2012 (39th) | SpongeBob SquarePants | Nickelodeon | |
2013 (40th)
| 2013 (40th) | Kung Fu Panda: Legends of Awesomeness | Nickelodeon | |
| 2013 (40th) | The Penguins of Madagascar | Nickelodeon | |
| 2013 (40th) | Robot and Monster | Nickelodeon | |
| 2013 (40th) | Teenage Mutant Ninja Turtles | Nickelodeon | |
| 2013 (40th) | WordGirl | PBS | |
2014 (41st)
| 2014 (41st) | Kung Fu Panda: Legends of Awesomeness | Nickelodeon | |
| 2014 (41st) | Beware the Batman | Cartoon Network | |
| 2014 (41st) | The Fairly OddParents | Nickelodeon | |
| 2014 (41st) | Monsters vs. Aliens | Nickelodeon | |
| 2014 (41st) | Turbo FAST | Netflix | |
2015 (42nd)
| 2015 (42nd) | All Hail King Julien | Netflix | |
| 2015 (42nd) | Arthur | PBS | |
| 2015 (42nd) | The Fairly OddParents | Nickelodeon | |
| 2015 (42nd) | Sanjay and Craig | Nickelodeon | |
2016 (43rd)
| 2016 (43rd) | Niko and the Sword of Light: From the Desert of Despair Into the Swamp of Sorrow! | Amazon | |
| 2016 (43rd) | All Hail King Julien | Netflix | |
| 2016 (43rd) | Dragons: Race to the Edge | Netflix | |
| 2016 (43rd) | The Mr. Peabody & Sherman Show | Netflix | |
| 2016 (43rd) | WordGirl | PBS | |
2017 (44th)
| 2017 (44th) | Lost in Oz: Extended Adventure | Amazon | |
| 2017 (44th) | Dragons: Race to the Edge | Netflix | |
| 2017 (44th) | Lego Star Wars: The Freemaker Adventures | Disney XD | |
| 2017 (44th) | Milo Murphy's Law | Disney Channel | |
| 2017 (44th) | The Mr. Peabody & Sherman Show | Netflix | |
2018 (45th)
| 2018 (45th) | SpongeBob SquarePants | Nickelodeon | |
| 2018 (45th) | Trollhunters | Netflix | |
| 2018 (45th) | Lost in Oz | Amazon | |
| 2018 (45th) | Milo Murphy's Law | Disney Channel | |
| 2018 (45th) | Wild Kratts | PBS | |
2019 (46th)
| 2019 (46th) | The Loud House | Nickelodeon | |
| 2019 (46th) | Hilda | Netflix | |
| 2019 (46th) | Mickey Mouse | Disney Channel | |
| 2019 (46th) | Rise of the Teenage Mutant Ninja Turtles | Nickelodeon | |
| 2019 (46th) | Welcome to the Wayne | Nickelodeon | |

== 2020s ==
| Year | Program | Network | Ref |
|---|---|---|---|
2020 (47th)
| 2020 (47th) | The Dragon Prince: Seasons 2-3 | Netflix | |
| 2020 (47th) | Arthur | PBS | |
| 2020 (47th) | The Casagrandes | Nickelodeon | |
| 2020 (47th) | Craig of the Creek | Cartoon Network | |
| 2020 (47th) | The Loud House | Nickelodeon | |
| 2020 (47th) | Niko and the Sword of Light | Amazon Prime Video | |
| 2020 (47th) | Trolls: The Beat Goes On!: Seasons 5-8 | Netflix | |
2021 (48th)
| 2021 (48th) | Hilda | Netflix | |
| 2021 (48th) | Amphibia | Disney Channel | |
| 2021 (48th) | Craig of the Creek | Cartoon Network | |
| 2021 (48th) | Kipo and the Age of Wonderbeasts | Netflix | |
| 2021 (48th) | Wizards: Tales of Arcadia | Netflix | |

== Total awards won ==
Total awards won Includes first-place ties
| Wins | Series |
|---|---|
| 4 | Arthur |
| 4 | Muppet Babies |
| 3 | Rugrats |
| 2 | The New Adventures of Winnie the Pooh |
| 2 | Tiny Toon Adventures |
| 2 | Animaniacs |
| 2 | Curious George |
| 2 | Kung Fu Panda: Legends of Awesomeness |
| 2 | The Penguins of Madagascar |
| 1 | All Hail King Julien |
| 1 | Beetlejuice |
| 1 | The Dragon Prince |
| 1 | Jakers! The Adventures of Piggley Winks |
| 1 | Little Bill |
| 1 | Madeline |
| 1 | Peep and the Big Wide World |
| 1 | Pinky, Elmyra & the Brain |
| 1 | Where on Earth Is Carmen Sandiego? |
| 1 | WordWorld |
| 1 | Niko and the Sword of Light |
| 1 | Lost in Oz: Extended Adventure |
| 1 | SpongeBob SquarePants |
| 1 | The Loud House |
| 1 | Hilda |

== Total awards ==
- Nickelodeon - 9
- PBS - 8
- CBS - 4
- ABC - 3
- The WB - 3
- Netflix - 3
- FOX - 2
- Amazon - 2
- Disney Channel - 1
- Nick Jr. - 1
- Syndication - 1
- The Learning Channel - 1

== Multiple Nominations ==
12 nominations

- Arthur

6 nominations

- Animaniacs
- Rugrats

5 nominations

- Curious George
- Dora the Explorer
- Muppet Babies
- The Smurfs

4 nominations

- Doug
- Peep and the Big Wide World
- The Penguins of Madagascar
- Where on Earth Is Carmen Sandiego?
- Sid the Science Kid

3 nominations

- Alvin and the Chipmunks
- The Backyardigans
- Clifford the Big Red Dog
- Dragon Tales
- Kung Fu Panda: Legends of Awesomeness
- The Magic School Bus
- The New Adventures of Winnie the Pooh
- Tiny Toon Adventures
- ToddWorld
- WordGirl

2 nominations

- 101 Dalmatians: The Series
- A Pup Named Scooby-Doo
- All Hail King Julien
- Batman: The Animated Series
- CBS Storybreak
- Craig of the Creek
- Darkwing Duck
- DuckTales
- Fat Albert and the Cosby Kids
- Hilda
- Kim Possible
- Little Einsteins
- Lost in Oz
- Madeline
- Niko and the Sword of Light
- Pinky and the Brain
- Pinky, Elmyra & the Brain
- Schoolhouse Rock!
- SpongeBob SquarePants
- Tales of Arcadia
- The Loud House

== See also ==
- List of animation awards
- Daytime Emmy Award for Outstanding Pre-School Children's Animated Program
