= Daytime Emmy Award for Outstanding Performer in an Animated Program =

Former television voice acting award

- Awarded for: Outstanding Performance in an Animated Program
- Country: United States
- Presented by: National Academy of Television Arts and Sciences
- First award: 1995
- Final award: 2021

Highlights
- Most awards: Eartha Kitt (3)
- Most nominations: Danny Jacobs; John Ritter; Lily Tomlin (4)

This is a list of winners of the Daytime Emmy Award for Outstanding Performer in an Animated Program. The award was presented between 1995 and 2021. It recognized a continuing or single voice-over performance in a series or special. The performance generally originated from a Children's Animated, Special Class Animated Program.

The youngest nominee in this category was Danica Lee, who was first nominated in 2007 at age 10 and again in 2008 at age 11.

In November 2021, it was announced that all Daytime Emmy categories honoring children's programming would be retired. This category in particular was broadened to three separate categories at the Children's & Family Emmy Awards beginning in 2022: Outstanding Voice Performance in a Preschool Animated Program, Outstanding Voice Performance in an Animated Program and Outstanding Younger Voice Performer in an Animated or Preschool Animated Program.

== Award winners ==
=== 1990s ===
- 1995: Lily Tomlin – The Magic School Bus: Season 1 as Valerie Felicity Frizzle
  - Roscoe Lee Browne – Spider-Man as Kingpin
  - Tim Curry – Mighty Max as Skullmaster
  - Ruby Dee – Whitewash as Grandmother
  - Rita Moreno – Where on Earth Is Carmen Sandiego? as Carmen Sandiego
- 1996: Nathan Lane – Timon & Pumbaa: Season 1 as Timon
  - Ed Asner – Spider-Man as J. Jonah Jameson
  - Keith David – Gargoyles as Goliath
  - Rita Moreno – Where on Earth Is Carmen Sandiego? as Carmen Sandiego
  - Ernie Sabella – Timon & Pumbaa: Season 1 as Pumbaa
  - Lily Tomlin – The Magic School Bus: Season 2 as Valerie Felicity Frizzle
- 1997: Louie Anderson – Life with Louie as Louis and Andy Anderson
  - Dennis Franz – Mighty Ducks as Captain Klegghorn
  - Rita Moreno – Where on Earth Is Carmen Sandiego? as Carmen Sandiego
  - Rob Paulsen – Pinky and the Brain as Pinky
  - Lily Tomlin – The Magic School Bus: Season 3 as Valerie Felicity Frizzle
- 1998: Louie Anderson – Life with Louie as Louis and Andy Anderson
  - Maurice LaMarche – Pinky and the Brain as the Brain
  - Rob Paulsen – Pinky and the Brain as Pinky
  - Lily Tomlin – The Magic School Bus: Season 4 as Valerie Felicity Frizzle
  - Robin Williams – Great Minds Think for Themselves as Genie
- 1999: Rob Paulsen – Pinky and the Brain as Pinky
  - Louie Anderson – Life with Louie as Louis and Andy Anderson
  - Ernest Borgnine – All Dogs Go to Heaven: The Series as Carface Caruthers
  - Dom DeLuise – All Dogs Go to Heaven: The Series as Itchy Itchiford
  - Jeffrey Tambor – The Lionhearts as Hank

=== 2000s ===
- 2000: James Woods – Hercules as Hades
  - Pam Grier – Happily Ever After: Fairy Tales for Every Child as The Nightingale
  - Robert Guillaume – Happily Ever After: Fairy Tales for Every Child as The Narrator
  - Nathan Lane – George and Martha as George
  - French Stewart – Hercules as Icarus
- 2001: Nathan Lane – Teacher's Pet as Spot/Scott Leadready II
  - Ruby Dee – Little Bill as Alice the Great
  - Kel Mitchell – Clifford the Big Red Dog as T-Bone
  - John Ritter – Clifford the Big Red Dog as Clifford
  - Cree Summer – Clifford the Big Red Dog as Cleo
- 2002: Charles Shaughnessy – Stanley as Dennis
  - Jackie Chan – Jackie Chan Adventures as himself
  - Kel Mitchell – Clifford the Big Red Dog as T-Bone
  - John Ritter – Clifford the Big Red Dog as Clifford
  - Alicia Silverstone – Braceface as Sharon Spitz
- 2003: Gregory Hines – Little Bill as Big Bill
  - Mindy Cohn – What's New, Scooby-Doo? as Velma Dinkley
  - Walter Cronkite – Liberty's Kids as Benjamin Franklin
  - Ruby Dee – Little Bill as Alice the Great
  - John Ritter – Clifford the Big Red Dog as Clifford
- 2004: Joe Alaskey – Duck Dodgers: Season 1 as Duck Dodgers
  - Nancy Cartwright – Kim Possible as Rufus
  - Walter Cronkite – Liberty's Kids as Benjamin Franklin
  - John Ritter – Clifford the Big Red Dog as Clifford
  - Henry Winkler – Clifford's Puppy Days as Norville
- 2005: Henry Winkler – Clifford's Puppy Days as Norville
  - Mel Brooks – Jakers! The Adventures of Piggley Winks as Wiley
  - Joan Cusack – Peep and the Big Wide World as The Narrator
  - Kevin Michael Richardson – The Batman as The Joker
  - Christy Carlson Romano – Kim Possible as Kim Possible
- 2006: Maile Flanagan – Jakers! The Adventures of Piggley Winks as Piggley Winks
  - Tony Jay – Miss Spider's Sunny Patch Friends as Spiderus
  - Jess Harnell – Pet Alien as Swanky and Gumpers
  - Tara Strong – Jakers! The Adventures of Piggley Winks as Dannan
  - Russi Taylor – Jakers! The Adventures of Piggley Winks as Ferny
- 2007: Eartha Kitt – The Emperor's New School as Yzma
  - Danica Lee – Wonder Pets as Ming Ming Duckling
  - Jim Conroy – Fetch! with Ruff Ruffman as Ruff Ruffman
  - Maile Flanagan – Jakers! The Adventures of Piggley Winks as Piggley Winks
  - Russi Taylor – Jakers! The Adventures of Piggley Winks as Ferny
- 2008: Eartha Kitt – The Emperor's New School as Yzma
  - Danica Lee – Wonder Pets as Ming Ming Duckling
  - Jessica DiCicco – The Emperor's New School as Malina
  - Christopher Lloyd – Cyberchase as The Hacker
  - Kevin Michael Richardson – The Batman as The Joker
- 2009: Jim Ward - Biker Mice from Mars as Eyemore and The Crusher
  - Jim Cummings – My Friends Tigger & Pooh as Tigger
  - Amy Poehler – The Mighty B! as Bessie Higgenbottom
  - Joan Rivers – Arthur as Bubbe
  - Vanessa Williams – Mama Mirabelle's Home Movies as Mama

=== 2010s ===
- 2010: Eartha Kitt – Wonder Pets!: Save the Cool Cat and the Hip Hippo as Cool Cat
  - Ed Asner – WordGirl: Meat My Dad as Kid Potato
  - Philip Seymour Hoffman – Arthur: No Acting Please as Will Toffman
  - Amy Poehler – The Mighty B! as Bessie Higgenbottom
- 2011: Danny Jacobs – The Penguins of Madagascar as King Julien
  - Peter Cullen – Transformers: Prime as Optimus Prime
  - Bill Farmer – Mickey Mouse Clubhouse as Goofy
  - Tom McGrath – The Penguins of Madagascar as Skipper
  - Martin Short – The Cat in the Hat Knows a Lot About That! as The Cat in the Hat
  - Steven Tyler – Wonder Pets! as The Mad Hatter
- 2012: June Foray – The Garfield Show: Which Witch as Mrs. Cauldron
  - Jeff Bennett - The Penguins of Madagascar as Kowalski
  - Rodger Bumpass - SpongeBob SquarePants as Squidward Tentacles
  - James Hong - Kung Fu Panda: Legends of Awesomeness as Mr. Ping
- 2013: David Tennant – Star Wars: The Clone Wars as Huyang
  - Curtis Armstrong – Dan Vs. as Dan
  - Jim Cummings – Star Wars: The Clone Wars as Hondo Ohnaka
  - Jerry Trainor – T.U.F.F. Puppy as Dudley Puppy
  - Sam Witwer – Star Wars: The Clone Wars as Darth Maul
- 2014: Hayley Faith Negrin – Peg + Cat as Peg
  - Sarah Bolt – Peter Rabbit as Jemima Puddleduck
  - Alan Cumming – Arthur: Show Off as Sebastian Winkleplotz
  - Dwayne Hill – Peg + Cat as Cat
  - Ashley Tisdale – Sabrina: Secrets of a Teenage Witch as Sabrina Spellman
- 2015: Danny Jacobs – All Hail King Julien as King Julien
  - Mark Hamill – Star Wars: The Clone Wars: Sacrifice as Darth Bane
  - Christopher Lloyd – Cyberchase: The Cyberchase Movie as The Hacker
  - Megan Mullally – Sofia the First: The Enchanted Feast as Miss Nettle
  - Dick Van Dyke – Mickey Mouse Clubhouse: Mickey's Pirate Adventure as Captain Goof Beard
- 2016: Jeff Bennett – Transformers: Rescue Bots as Mayor Luskey
  - Carlos Alazraqui – The Fairly OddParents as Mr. Crocker
  - Eric Bauza – The Adventures of Puss in Boots: Seasons 1-2 as Puss in Boots and Sino.
  - Danny Jacobs – All Hail King Julien as King Julien
  - Reid Scott – Turbo FAST: Season 2 as Turbo
- 2017: Kelsey Grammer – Trollhunters: Season 1 as Blinky
  - Danny Jacobs – All Hail King Julien as King Julien, Pancho
  - Kate McKinnon – Nature Cat as Squeeks
  - Andy Richter – All Hail King Julien as Mort/Smart Mort/Morticus Khan and Ted
  - Rick Zieff – The Tom and Jerry Show as Spike
- 2018: Tom Kenny – SpongeBob SquarePants as SpongeBob SquarePants
  - Chris Diamantopoulos – Skylanders Academy: Season 2 as Master Eon
  - Tress MacNeille – VeggieTales in the City as Aprilcot, Madame Blueberry, Junior Asparagus, Lisa Asparagus and Night Pony
  - Andy Richter – All Hail King Julien as Mort/Grammy Mort and Smart Mort
  - John Tartaglia – Splash and Bubbles as Splash & Mrs. Tidy
- 2019: Jay Baruchel - Dragons: Race to the Edge: Season 8 as Hiccup
  - Bob Bergen - Wabbit: A Looney Tunes Production as Porky Pig
  - Chris Diamantopoulos – Mickey Mouse as Mickey Mouse
  - Mark Hamill – Kulipari: Dream Walker: Dream Walker as Old Jir and Caz
  - Marieve Herington – Big City Greens as Tilly Green
  - Ruth Negga – Angela's Christmas as Mother

=== 2020s ===
- 2020: Tom Kenny – SpongeBob SquarePants as SpongeBob SquarePants
  - Paget Brewster – DuckTales as Della Duck
  - Marieve Herington – Big City Greens as Tilly Green
  - Chris Houghton – Big City Greens as Cricket Green
  - Parker Simmons – Mao Mao: Heroes of Pure Heart as Mao Mao
- 2021: Parker Simmons - Mao Mao: Heroes of Pure Heart as Mao Mao
  - Eric Bauza - Looney Tunes Cartoons as Bugs Bunny/Daffy Duck
  - Tom Kenny – SpongeBob SquarePants as SpongeBob SquarePants
  - Tress MacNeille - Animaniacs as Dot Warner
  - Jonathan Pryce - Piney: The Lonesome Pine as Grandpa Sid

== Programs with multiple awards ==
2 awards

- Life with Louie
- The Emperor's New School
- SpongeBob SquarePants

== Multiple wins ==
3 wins

- Eartha Kitt

2 wins

- Louie Anderson
- Danny Jacobs
- Nathan Lane
- Tom Kenny

== Total awards ==
- Nickelodeon - 5
- Cartoon Network/PBS - 4
- Disney/Fox/Netflix - 3
- ABC - 2
- CBS/Syndication/The WB/Discovery Family - 1

== Multiple nominations ==
4 nominations

- Danny Jacobs
- John Ritter
- Lily Tomlin

3 nominations

- Louie Anderson
- Ruby Dee
- Eartha Kitt
- Nathan Lane
- Rita Moreno
- Rob Paulsen
- Tom Kenny

2 nominations

- Danica Lee
- Ed Asner
- Eric Bauza
- Jeff Bennett
- Jim Cummings
- Walter Cronkite
- Chris Diamantopoulos
- Maile Flanagan
- Mark Hamill
- Marieve Herington
- Christopher Lloyd
- Tress MacNeille
- Kel Mitchell
- Kevin Michael Richardson
- Amy Poehler
- Andy Richter
- Parker Simmons
- Russi Taylor
- Henry Winkler
