= 23rd Daytime Emmy Awards =

- Date: May 22, 1996 (Ceremony); May 18, 1996 (Creative Arts Awards)
- Presented by: National Academy of Television Arts and Sciences
- Hosted by: Eric Braeden; Melody Thomas Scott

Highlights
- Outstanding Drama Series: General Hospital
- Outstanding Game Show: The Price is Right

Television/radio coverage
- Network: CBS

The 23rd Daytime Emmy Awards were held on May 22, 1996, on CBS to commemorate excellence in daytime programming from the previous year (1995). At this ceremony, Erika Slezak set a then record with five Emmy Awards for Lead Actress. She would beat her own record in 2005. The telecast aired two-hours. The Creative Arts Emmy celebration took place on May 18, 1996.

Winners in each category are in bold.

== Outstanding Drama Series ==
- All My Children
- Days of Our Lives
- **General Hospital**
- The Young and the Restless

== Outstanding Lead Actor in a Drama Series ==
- Maurice Benard (Sonny Corinthos, General Hospital)
- Peter Bergman (Jack Abbott, The Young and the Restless)
- Eric Braeden (Victor Newman, The Young and the Restless)
- David Canary (Adam Chandler/Stuart Chandler, All My Children)
- **Charles Keating (Carl Hutchins, Another World)**

== Outstanding Lead Actress in a Drama Series ==
- Jensen Buchanan (Vicky Hudson, Another World)
- Linda Dano (Felicia Gallant, Another World)
- Susan Lucci (Erica Kane, All My Children)
- **Erika Slezak (Victoria Lord, One Life to Live)**
- Jess Walton (Jill Abbott, The Young and the Restless)

== Outstanding Supporting Actor in a Drama Series ==
- Frank Beaty (Brent Lawrence, Guiding Light)
- Ian Buchanan (James Warwick, The Bold and the Beautiful)
- Stuart Damon (Alan Quartermaine, General Hospital)
- David Forsyth (John Hudson, Another World)
- Michael Sutton (Stone Cates, General Hospital)
- **Jerry verDorn (Ross Marler, Guiding Light)**

== Outstanding Supporting Actress in a Drama Series ==
- Rosalind Cash (Mary Mae Ward, General Hospital)
- **Anna Holbrook (Sharlene Frame Hudson, Another World)**
- Victoria Rowell (Drucilla Winters, The Young and the Restless)
- Michelle Stafford (Phyllis Romalotti, The Young and the Restless)
- Tonya Lee Williams (Olivia Hastings, The Young and the Restless)

== Outstanding Younger Actor in a Drama Series ==
- Nathan Fillion (Joey Buchanan, One Life to Live)
- Jonathan Jackson (Lucky Spencer, General Hospital)
- **Kevin Mambo (Marcus Williams, Guiding Light)**
- Shemar Moore (Malcolm Winters, The Young and the Restless)
- Joshua Morrow (Nicholas Newman, The Young and the Restless)

== Outstanding Younger Actress in a Drama Series ==
- Kimberly J. Brown (Marah Lewis, Guiding Light)
- Martha Byrne (Lily Walsh Grimaldi, As the World Turns)
- Sharon Case (Sharon Collins, The Young and the Restless)
- **Kimberly McCullough (Robin Scorpio, General Hospital)**
- Heather Tom (Victoria Newman, The Young and the Restless)

== Outstanding Drama Series Writing Team ==
- **All My Children**
- Another World
- As the World Turns
- One Life to Live

== Outstanding Drama Series Directing Team ==
- All My Children
- Days of Our Lives
- General Hospital
- **The Young and the Restless**

== Outstanding Graphics and Title Design ==
- **Michael Saz and Andrew Carl Wilk (Really Wild Animals)**
- Linda Paris (CNN Newsroom)
- Ian Dawson, and Marco Bacich, John Ridgway, Jerry Steele and Chris Williamson (Day & Date)
- Paul Newman, and Billy Pittard (One Life to Live)
- Suzanne Kiley and Billy Pittard (Ricki Lake)
- Suzanne Kiley, Thalia Kalodimos, Ed Sullivan and Harriet Seitler (The Oprah Winfrey Show)

== Outstanding Directing in a Children's Series ==
- **David Grossman, Gary Halvorson and Shelley Jensen (Adventures in Wonderland)**
- Mark Mannucci, Ed Wiseman and Larry La (Reading Rainbow)
- Andrew Carl Wilk (Really Wild Animals)
- Gary Shimokawa, Steve Feldman, Emily Squires, Ted May, Lisa Simon and John Ferraro (Sesame Street)
- Tom Trbovich, Ed Wiseman (The Puzzle Place)
- Hugh Martin (Where in the World Is Carmen Sandiego?)

== Outstanding Writing in a Children's Series ==
- **Erren Gottlieb, Bill Nye, James McKenna, Scott Schaefer, Adam Gross and Seth Gross (Bill Nye, the Science Guy)**
- Mark Waxman, Barry Friedman, Casey Keller, Richard Albrecht and Phil Walsh (Beakman's World)
- Mallory Tarcher, Shari Lewis, Aubrey Tadman, Ken Steele, Tibby Rothman, Lan O'Kun and Bernard Rothman (Lamb Chop's Play-Along)
- Fred Rogers (Mister Rogers' Neighborhood)
- Mark Eisman, Andrew Gutelle, Ronnie Krauss, Jill Gluckson, Lee Hunkins, Susan Kim (Reading Rainbow)
- Norman Stiles, John Weidman, Lou Berger, Belinda Ward, Cathi Turow, Ian Ellis James, Adam Rudman, Nancy Sans, Sonia Manzano, Joey Mazzarino, Mo Willems, Emily Perl Kingsley, Christine Ferraro, David Korr, Jeff Moss, Judy Freudberg, Josh Selig, Sara Compton, Molly Boylan, Luis Santeiro, Tony Geiss (Sesame Street)

== Outstanding Music Direction and Composition ==
- **Harvey Cohen and Shirley Walker (Batman: The Animated Series: "A Bullet For Bullock")**
- Steven Bernstein, Carl Johnson and Richard Stone (Animaniacs)
- Carl Johnson (Gargoyles)
- Steven Bernstein and Richard Stone (Pinky and the Brain)
- Jeff Moss, Paul Jacobs, Stephen Lawrence, Tony Geiss, Christopher Cerf, Sarah Durkee, Dave Conner, Gail Sky King, Danny Epstein and Robby Merkin (Sesame Street)

== Outstanding Original Song ==
- **Richard Stone - (Music), and Tom Ruegger - (Lyrics) For the main theme "Freakazoid!" (Freakazoid!)**
- Chuck DeAngelo (Music and lyrics) and Robert Sands (Music and lyrics) (Another World)
- Ron Brawer - (lyrics), Barry Allen Rowe - (Music) (As the World Turns)
- Paul Simon (The Oprah Winfrey Show)

== Outstanding Sound Editing ==
- **Jim Wilson, Thomas McGurk, Michael McAuliffe, Dave Howe and Ella Brackett (Bill Nye, the Science Guy)**
- Steve Bissinger, William H. Angarola, Kathryn Dayak, Mark Cookson, Gary Freedman, Kimberly Lambert and Robert Guastini (Flipper)
- David Browning and Dick Maitland (Sesame Street)

== Outstanding Sound Editing - Special Class ==
- **Robert Hargreaves, Matt Thorne, Russell Brower, Mike Dickeson, Bob Lacivita, Tom Maydeck, Mark Keatts, John Hegedes, Pat Rodman and Kelly Ann Foley (Batman: The Animated Series)**
- Timothy Borquez, Rick Hinson, Rick Hammel, Les Wolf and Thomas Syslo (Life with Louie)
- William Griggs, Cecil Broughton, Kenneth Young, Charles Rychwalski, Jennifer Mertens and Ernesto Mas (Aladdin)
- Marty Stein, David John West, Rick Hinson, Anthony Torretto, Chris Fradkin and Terry Reiff (The Tick)

== Outstanding Sound Mixing - Special Class ==
- **Michael Jiron, Allen L. Stone and Deb Adair (Aladdin)**
- Melissa Ellis, Jim Hodson, Dan Hiland, Joseph D. Citarella, Bill Koepnick, Deb Adair, Michael Jiron and Allen L. Stone (Timon & Pumbaa)
- Dan Hiland and Timothy Borquez (Life with Louie)
- Stuart Calderon, Deb Adair, John Boyd and David John West (The Tick)
- Matt Thorne, Harry Andronis and Tom Maydeck (Batman: The Animated Series)
- Mick Gormaley and Chuck Hammer (Really Wild Animals)
- P.M.C / Adrian Loader, (The Lion King's Timon & Pumbaa)

== Outstanding Sound Mixing ==
- **Christian P. Minkler, Paul Brincat, Jon Taylor and Kevin Patrick Burns (Flipper)**
- Galen Handy and Paul Schremp (ABC Afterschool Specials - "Fast Forward")
- Don Summer and Thomas Orsi (ABC Afterschool Specials - "Crosstown")

== Outstanding Makeup ==
- **Ron Wild and Karen Stephens (Adventures in Wonderland)**
- Janet Flora (Day & Date)
- Judith Silverman and Keith Crary (Reading Rainbow)
- Randy Houston Mercer and Stephanie Cozart Burton (Reading Rainbow)
- Joe Cuervo (Sesame Street)
- Karen Borgo-Santo (Maury)

== Outstanding Children's Animated Program ==
- **Steven Spielberg, Tom Ruegger, Peter Hastings and Rusty Mills (Animaniacs)**
- George Newall, Tom Yohe and Radford Stone (Schoolhouse Rock!)
- Alison Blank, Jane Startz, Kristin Laskas Martin, Karen Stevens, Michael Hirsh, Patrick Loubert, Clive A. Smith, Stephen Hodgins and Patricia R. Burns (The Magic School Bus)
- Saul Cooper, Pancho Kohner, Michael Maliani, Robby London, Andy Heyward, Judy Rothman Rofé and Stan Phillips (The New Adventures of Madeline)
- Robby London, Michael Maliani, Andy Heyward, Michael E. Uslan, Sean Roche, Renee Toporzysek and Joe Barruso (Where on Earth Is Carmen Sandiego?)

== Outstanding in Animation ==
- **Gordon Bressack, Charles M. Howell IV, Peter Hastings, Randy Rogel, Tom Ruegger, Paul Rugg, Liz Holzman, Audu Paden, Andrea Romano, Al Zegler, Joey Banaszkiewicz, Barry Caldwell, Brian Mitchell, John Over, Norma Rivera, Rhoydon Shishido, Marcus Williams and Mark Zoeller (Animaniacs)**
- Mircea Mantta, Gerard Baldwin, Barbara Dourmashkin, Alan Zaslove, Jamie Thomason, Rob LaDuca, Dale Case, Bob Roth, Bill Motz, Mark Seidenberg, Mirith J. Colao, Denise Koyama and Lonnie Lloyd (Aladdin)
- Andrea Romano, Liz Holzman, Al Zegler and Peter Hastings (Pinky and the Brain)
- Andres Nieves, Claude Denis, Phillip Kim, David Manners, Richard Liebmann-Smith, Susan Blu, Larry Latham, Elaine Hultgren, Chuck Harvey, Christopher McCulloch, Hank Tucker and Ben Edlund (The Tick)
- Richard Ziehler-Martin, Jeff Starling, Hector Martinez, Lin Hua Zheng, Ted Blackman, John Wee, Ed Klautky, Felipe Morell, Sung Hwan Choi, Jeremy M. Hopkinson, Ray Shenusay, Teri Shikasho, Tim Deacon, Keith Weesner, Bill Sienkiewicz, Rick Del Carmen, Chuck Puntuvatana, Tom Nesbitt, Dave Simons, Dan Fausett, Francis Barrios, Romeo Francisco, Clint Taylor, Eric Fredrickson, Neil Hunter, Nicholas Filippi, Joseph Dempsey, Ron Harris, Sean Roche and Joe Barruso (Where on Earth Is Carmen Sandiego?)

== Outstanding Performer in an Animated Program ==
- **Nathan Lane (Timon, Timon & Pumbaa)**
- Keith David (Goliath, Gargoyles)
- Edward Asner (J. Jonah Jameson, Spider-Man: The Animated Series)
- Lily Tomlin (Valerie Felicity Frizzle, The Magic School Bus)
- Ernie Sabella (Pumbaa, Timon & Pumbaa)
- Rita Moreno (Carmen Sandiego, Where on Earth Is Carmen Sandiego?)

== Outstanding Game Show ==
- **The Price Is Right**
- Jeopardy!

== Outstanding Game Show Host ==
- **Bob Barker**
- Alex Trebek

== Outstanding Children's Series ==
- **Reading Rainbow**

== Lifetime achievement award ==
- **Phil Donahue**
