= 22nd Daytime Emmy Awards =

- Date: May 19, 1995 (Ceremony); 1995 (Creative Arts Awards)
- Presented by: National Academy of Television Arts and Sciences
- Hosted by: Leeza Gibbons; Deidre Hall

Highlights
- Outstanding Drama Series: General Hospital
- Outstanding Game Show: Jeopardy!

Television/radio coverage
- Network: NBC

The 22nd Daytime Emmy Awards were that were held on May 19, 1995, on NBC to commemorate excellence in daytime programming from the previous year (1994). The nominees were announced on March 29, 1995. Winners are in bold.

== Outstanding Drama Series ==
- All My Children
- Days of Our Lives
- **General Hospital**
- The Young and the Restless

== Outstanding Lead Actor ==
- Peter Bergman (Jack Abbott, The Young and the Restless)
- David Canary (Adam Chandler/Stuart Chandler, All My Children)
- **Justin Deas (Buzz Cooper, Guiding Light)**
- Brad Maule (Tony Jones, General Hospital)
- Michael Zaslow (Roger Thorpe, Guiding Light)

== Outstanding Lead Actress ==
- Leslie Charleson (Monica Quartermaine, General Hospital)
- Marj Dusay (Alexandra Spaulding, Guiding Light)
- Maeve Kinkead (Vanessa Chamberlain, Guiding Light)
- Susan Lucci (Erica Kane, All My Children)
- **Erika Slezak (Victoria Lord, One Life to Live)**

== Outstanding Supporting Actor ==
- Keith Hamilton Cobb (Noah Keefer, All My Children)
- Ian Buchanan (James Warwick, The Bold and the Beautiful)
- Rick Hearst (Alan-Michael Spaulding, Guiding Light)
- Roger Howarth (Todd Manning, One Life to Live)
- **Jerry verDorn (Ross Marler, Guiding Light)**

== Outstanding Supporting Actress ==
- Jean Carol (Nadine Corley, Guiding Light)
- Melina Kanakaredes (Eleni Andros, Guiding Light)
- Sydney Penny (Julia Santos, All My Children)
- **Rena Sofer (Lois Cerullo, General Hospital)**
- Jacklyn Zeman (Bobbie Spencer, General Hospital)

== Outstanding Younger Actor ==
- Jason Biggs (Pete Wendall, As the World Turns)
- Bryan Buffington (Bill Lewis, Guiding Light)
- **Jonathan Jackson (Lucky Spencer, General Hospital)**
- Tommy J. Michaels (Tim Dillon, All My Children)

== Outstanding Younger Actress ==
- **Sarah Michelle Gellar (Kendall Hart, All My Children)**
- Kimberly McCullough (Robin Scorpio, General Hospital)
- Rachel Miner (Michelle Bauer, Guiding Light)
- Heather Tom (Victoria Newman, The Young and the Restless)

== Outstanding Drama Series Writing Team ==
- All My Children
- **General Hospital**
- One Life to Live
- The Young and the Restless

== Outstanding Drama Series Directing Team ==
- **All My Children**
- Another World
- As the World Turns
- One Life to Live
- The Young and the Restless

== Outstanding Game/Audience Participation Show ==
- **Jeopardy!** (Columbia TriStar Television/KingWorld)
- American Gladiators (Four Point Entertainment/Samuel Goldwyn TV)
- Fourth Annual Rock N' Jock B-Ball Jam
- The Price Is Right (Mark Goodson Productions/All American Television/Paramount Television/CBS)
- Wheel of Fortune (Columbia TriStar Television/KingWorld)

== Outstanding Game Show Host ==
- **Bob Barker** (The Price Is Right)
- Alex Trebek (Jeopardy!)

== Outstanding Costume Design ==
- **Lois DeArmond (Adventures in Wonderland)**
- Ann Marie Holdgruen, Laurent Linn, Carlo Yannuzzi, Larry Jameson, Mark Ruffin, Terry Roberson, Stephen Rotondaro, Edward G. Christie, Rollin Krewson, William Kellard, Mark Zeszotek, Connie Peterson, Peter MacKennan, Fred Buchholz, Goran Sparrman, and Tom Newby (Sesame Street)
- Danajean Cicerchi (Where in the World Is Carmen Sandiego?)
- Lois DeArmond, and Betsey Potter (Beakman's World)
- Doug Enderle (Walt Disney World Very Merry Christmas Parade)
- Charles Chiodo, Stephen Chiodo, and Edward Chiodo (ABC Weekend Specials - "Crash the Curiousaurus")

== Outstanding Animated Children's Program ==
- Steven Spielberg, Tom Ruegger, Sherri Stoner and Rich Arons (Animaniacs)
- Tad Stones and Alan Zaslove (Aladdin)
- Jamie Mitchell, Tedd Anasti and Patsy Cameron (The Little Mermaid)
- Vanessa Coffey, Gabor Csupo, Arlene Klasky, Mary Harrington, Charles Swenson, Paul Germain and Geraldine Clarke (Rugrats)
- **Michael E. Uslan, Benjamin Melniker, Andy Heyward, Robby London, Michael Maliani and Sean Roche (Where on Earth Is Carmen Sandiego?)**

== Outstanding Children's Series ==
- **Linda Ellerbee, Rolfe Tessem, Murr LeBay, Bob Brienza, and Mark Lyons (Nick News with Linda Ellerbee)**
- James McKenna, Hamilton McCulloch, Erren Gottlieb, and Elizabeth Brock (Bill Nye, the Science Guy)
- Robert Heath, and Mark Waxman (Beakman's World)
- Ed Wiseman, Cecily Truett, Larry Lancit, Stacey Raider, Orly Berger, Twila Liggett, Tony Buttino, LeVar Burton, and Jill Gluckson (Reading Rainbow)
- Jay Rayvid, Lynn Kestinn-Sessler, Kate Taylor, Howard Lee, Howard J. Blumenthal, and Jonathan G. Meath (Where in the World Is Carmen Sandiego?)

== Outstanding Film Sound Mixing ==
- **Timothy J. Garrity, Timothy Borquez, Jim Hodson, Bill Koepnick, Melissa Ellis and Deb Adair (Aladdin)**
- Thomas Orsi and Don Summer (ABC Afterschool Specials:Boys Will Be Boys)
- Timothy J. Borquez and Timothy J. Garrity (The Little Mermaid)
- David John West, John Boyd and Todd Orr (The Tick)
- John Asman, Walt Martin, David E. Fluhr and Sam Black (Trick of the Eye)
- David John West, Kevin Patrick Burns, Todd Orr and John Boyd (Exosquad)

== Outstanding Film Sound Editing ==
- **Alex Wilkinson, Charles Rychwalski, William Griggs, Kenneth Young, Melissa Ellis, Bill Koepnick, Greg LaPlante, Jennifer Mertens, Ray Leonard, Michael Geisler, John O. Robinson III, Marc S. Perlman Michael Gollom, Jim Hodson, Timothy J. Borquez, Phyllis Ginter, Robert Duran and Tom Jaeger (Aladdin)**
- Brian F. Mars, Charles Rychwalski, Michael Geisler, John O. Robinson III, Jennifer Mertens, Tom Jaeger and Greg LaPlante (The Little Mermaid)
- David John West, Matthew West, Chris Fradkin, Rick Hinson, Mark Cleary and Susan Welsh (Exosquad)
- Mark Cleary, Chris Fradkin, Rick Hinson and David John West (The Tick)
- Matt Thorne, John Hegedes, Tom Maydeck, Robert Hargreaves, Russell Brower, Mark Keatts, J.J. George, Mike Dickeson and Daryl B. Kell (Batman: The Animated Series)

== Outstanding Music Direction and Composition ==
- **Mark Watters, John Given, Harvey Cohen, Carl Johnson and Thomas Richard Sharp (Aladdin)**
- Jeff Moss, Christopher Cerf, Tony Geiss, Gail Sky King, Robby Merkin, Stephen Lawrence, Sarah Durkee, Dave Conner and Paul Jacobs (Sesame Street)
- Don Sebesky (Allegra's Window)
- Shirley Walker (Batman: The Animated Series)
- Steven Bernstein and Richard Stone (Animaniacs)

== Outstanding in Animation ==
- **Peter Gaffney, Jonathan Greenberg, Rachel Lipman, Paul Germain, Steve Socki, Howard E. Baker and Jim Duffy (Rugrats)**
- Robert Renzetti, Todd Frederiksen, Mark Saraceni, Tony Craig and Miles Thompson (2 Stupid Dogs)
- Derdad Aghamalian, Ed Klautky, Craig Wilson, Sung Hwan Choi, Rae McCarson, Ted Blackman, Leonard Robledo, Rick Del Carmen, Richard Ziehler-Martin, Alex Stevens, Fedja Jovanovic, Bill Sienkiewicz, Joseph Dempsey, Kent Butterworth, Lin Zeng, Tom Nesbitt, Ray Shenusay, Sean Roche, Neil Hunter, John Schaeffer, Chuck Puntuvatana, Felipe Morell, Teri Shikasho, Doug Molitor, Eufronio R. Cruz, Keith Weesner, Moe Green, Hector Martinez, Fernando Tenedora and Junn Roca (Where on Earth Is Carmen Sandiego?)
- Chris Battle, Jeff W. Smith, Cathy Malkasian, Igor Kovalyov, John Holmquist, Debbie Baber, Vadim Medzhibovskiy, Rumen Petkov, Zhenia Delioussine, Stephen Lawes, Bradley J. Gake, Alex Dilts, Anita Ziobro, Peter Gaffney, Jim Duffy, Kelly James, Dan Krall, Toni Vian, Sergey Shramkosky, Marcy Rubin, Andrei Svislotski, Ron Campbell, Jerry Richardson, David Litt, David Silverman, Steve Ressel and Craig Simmons (Aaahh!!! Real Monsters)
- Rich Arons, Barry Caldwell, Michael Gerard, Alfred Gimeno, Dave Marshall, Jon McClenahan, Rusty Mills, Audu Paden, Greg Reyna, Lenord Robinson, Andrea Romano, Peter Hastings, Nicholas Hollander, John P. McCann, Tom Minton, Deanna Oliver, Randy Rogel, Paul Rugg, Tom Ruegger and Sherri Stoner (Animaniacs)

== Outstanding Performer In An Animated Program ==
- **Lily Tomlin (Valerie Felicity Frizzle, The Magic School Bus)**
- Tim Curry (Skullmaster, Mighty Max)
- Roscoe Lee Browne (Kingpin, Spider-Man: The Animated Series)
- Rita Moreno (Carmen Sandiego, Where on Earth Is Carmen Sandiego?)
- Ruby Dee (Grandmother, Whitewash)

== Lifetime achievement award ==
- **Ted Corday**
- **Betty Corday**
