= Life with Louie =

American animated sitcom (1995–1998)

- Created by: Louie Anderson; Matthew O'Callaghan
- Voices of: Louie Anderson; Debi Derryberry; Edie McClurg; Miko Hughes; Justin Shenkarow; Mary Wickes; Liz Sheridan; Tommy Hinkley; Meagen Fay
- Country of origin: United States
- No. of seasons: 3
- No. of episodes: 39

Production
- Producers: Louie Anderson; Ahmos Hassan; Matthew O'Callaghan; Martha Carrol; John Lanza
- Running time: 22–24 minutes
- Production companies: Fox Children's Productions; Hyperion Animation; The Anderson/Hassan Company

Original release
- Network: Fox Kids
- Release: September 2, 1995 – March 2, 1998

Life with Louie is an American animated sitcom created by Louie Anderson and Matthew O'Callaghan for the Fox Broadcasting Company. The series was based on the childhood of Anderson, growing up with his family in the fictional town of Cedar Knoll, Wisconsin during the early 1960s, although Anderson himself was actually from Saint Paul, Minnesota, also situated in the Midwestern U.S.

The first two episodes aired in primetime on Fox in late 1994, before moving to Saturday morning on Fox Kids from 1995 to 1998.

Ownership of the series passed to Disney in 2001 when Disney acquired Fox Kids Worldwide.

== Characters ==
- Louis "Louie" Anderson (voiced by Louie Anderson) — Based on Anderson's younger self. Louie is an 8-year-old, living in the fictional town of Cedar Knoll, Wisconsin. He is a very sensitive, humorous, impressionable, and intelligent young boy. He often uses his gifted sense of humor to deal with difficult situations. He always stands up for his rights and principles, but also for those of others. His most notable catchphrase in the series is "All right!"
- Jeannie Harper (voiced by Debi Derryberry) — Louie's best friend. She often defends Louie from local bullies. Louie has a crush on her.
- Michael "Mike" Grunewald (voiced by Justin Shenkarow) — Louie's friend with a sarcastic sense of humor. He has a somewhat relaxed attitude and comes from a rather wealthy family, sometimes much to Louie's jealousy.
- Toddler Tobolinski — Louie's other friend. He is somewhat shorter than the others, about the same height as Louie, and loves activities like recess.
- Scott Jensen — One of Louie's friends. He appears quite often in the first and third seasons, but is rarely seen in Season 2.
- Andrew "Andy" Mortimer Anderson (voiced by Louie Anderson) — Louie's demanding, but caring father. He is a veteran of World War II and likes to tell his family stories about his experience at the front in Europe. Much of the humor regarding Andy involved his comic superiority complex and equally comical unawareness of his limitations. Though he often appeared out of touch with reality, Andy was secretly a very gifted chess player, a skill Louie was briefly shown to have himself, but he exposed his gift during the latter half of his life because of the way he was supposedly mistreated for it in his youth (including during the time he had previously served in the army; even going so far as to disguise himself at chess tournaments so he would not be recognized). He is a proud owner of a Rambler sedan (most probably a 1959 Rambler Six), which appears on the show in various episodes. His catchphrases: "For crying out loud!" and "I heard that." Despite his appearance, he is a very caring and loving, with his family, neighbors (to whom he is seen expressing solidarity in times of trouble), and other characters.
- Ora Anderson (voiced by Edie McClurg) — Louie's kind, loving, and sweet-natured mother. She usually acts as the voice of reason for Louie and Andy and also for Tommy.
- Thomas "Tommy" Anderson (voiced by Miko Hughes) — Louie's youngest brother. Louie teases him a lot in the beginning.
- Glen Glenn (voiced by Justin Shenkarow) — The local bully of Louie's school who teases Louie and the other kids. His mother Jen Glenn has a hot temper and loud voice, which the other citizens of Cedar Knoll do not like.
- Craig Eric, Paul George — Glen Glenn's friends and other bullies.
- The Melvins — A group of chess specialists. One of them is actually named Franklin, but is still called Melvin.
- Henrietta Shermann (voiced by Mary Wickes) — The mother of Ora and maternal grandmother of Louie. When her voice actress Mary Wickes died in Season 2, the producers elected to make an episode where Louie handles the death of his grandmother.
- Pepper — Louie's obese pet goldfish.
- Sid Anderson, John Anderson, Danny Anderson, Peter Anderson — Louie's older brothers.
- Norton Jensen, Earl Grunewald, Gus Williams, Mrs. Stillman — Louie's neighbors.
- Laura Anderson, Carol Anderson, Charlie Anderson, Julie Anderson — Louie's older sisters.

== Episode list ==
=== Specials ===
No.	Title	Written and directed by	Storyboard by	Original release date
0	"A Christmas Surprise for Mrs. Stillman"	Matthew O' Callaghan	Martin Fuller and Dan Root	December 18, 1994
Christmas special/pilot: It's Christmas time. Ora asks Andy to decorate Mrs. Stillman's house with Christmas lights. Andy seeks Louie's help, and both decorate the house with the help of Louie's friends, who arrive at the house for singing.

=== Season 1 (1995–1996) ===
No. overall	No. in season	Title	Directed by	Written by	Storyboard by	Original release date
1	1	"Dad Gets Canned"	Matthew O' Callaghan	Andy Rose; Alex Taub	Bert Ring (director); Carin-Anne Anderson, Dan Fausett and Jim Fletcher	September 2, 1995
Andy gets fired from his job for giving his friend the day off for the birth of his child. Louie gets upset because he wants to spend his vacation relaxing and sitting around, but Andy forces him to work. Ora gets a job selling cosmetics to her neighbors. While Louie accompanies Ora, he learns why Andy lost his job.
2	2	"Raindrops Keep Falling on My Bed"	Matthew O'Callaghan	Alex Taub	Bert Ring (director); Carin-Anne Anderson, Jim Fletcher and Michael Sosnowski	September 9, 1995
The Jensen family moves into the house next to the Andersons. While Andy fights with Mr. Jensen about their property lines, a rainstorm floods the town.
3	3	"Lake Winnibigoshish"	Matthew O'Callaghan	Alex Taub	Bert Ring (director); Martin Fuller and Dan Root	September 16, 1995
The Anderson family goes to Lake Winnibigoshish for their vacation, where Louie meets Kelly Busset (Olivia Hack), who has a crush on him. But Louie does not like her.
4	4	"A Fish Called Pepper"	Matthew O'Callaghan	Alex Taub	Bert Ring (director); Carin-Anne Anderson, Dan Fausett and Jim Fletcher	September 23, 1995
Jeannie moves because her father is given a new job. Afterward, Louie's grandma comes to visit, and because of her, Louie sends a letter to Jeannie telling her he loves her. Meanwhile, the family gets a pet fish because they cannot afford a dog nor a cat. The former “justified” under the “explanation” they shed and their fur would clog all the drains to the point the house would fill with water and the latter because “lick the butter”. In the end, Jeannie returns because her father's new job failed.
5	5	"Behind Every Good Coach"	Matthew O'Callaghan	Alex Taub	Bert Ring (director); Martin Fuller and Dan Root	October 7, 1995
Louie joins the baseball team, but during their first game, the coach (Tommy Lasorda) gets hurt, and Andy becomes the new coach. With the team unable to win, Ora gives them a few pointers, and they win their final game.
6	6	"Alive! Miracle in Cedar Knoll, Wisconsin"	Matthew O'Callaghan	Alex Taub	Dan Fausett and Keith Tucker	November 4, 1995
While Andy and Ora leave to visit Grandma, Louie and Tommy are left alone at the house as a blizzard hits and causes a blackout in Cedar Knoll.
7	7	"Pains, Grains, and Allergy Shots"	Matthew O'Callaghan	Bernie Ancheta	Tom Riggin and Rafael Rosado	November 11, 1995
Louie suddenly develops a food allergy.
8	8	"The Fourth Thursday in November"	Matthew O'Callaghan	Alex Taub	Carin-Anne Anderson, Dan Fausett, Mark Mulgrew, Keith Tucker, Jorge Burge, Steve Lumley, Robert Smit and Deke Wightman	November 18, 1995
All of the Anderson family comes to Louie's house for Thanksgiving dinner, including Ora's brother Uncle Sammy (Barry Corbin), whom Andy dislikes.
9	9	"Tracks of My Deers"	Matthew O'Callaghan	Alex Taub	John Burge, Mark Mulgrew, Rafael Rosado, Melissa Suber, Steve Lumley, Lou Police, Robert Smit and George Sukara	November 25, 1995
While on a deer hunt with Andy and his friends, Louie meets a lonely deer and decides to keep it until the hunt finishes.
10	10	"When Cedar Knoll Freezes Over"	Matthew O'Callaghan	Alex Taub; Bernie Ancheta	Jorge Burge, Steve Lumley, Dan Fausett, Mark Mulgrew and Robert Smit	February 3, 1996
The winter carnival begins in Cedar Knoll, and The Anderson family loses every competition they enter. Meanwhile, Louie develops a crush on Jeannie's sister and tries to learn how to skate to get close to her.
11	11	"A Fair to Remember"	Matthew O'Callaghan	Greg Cope; Sean Dwyer	Tom Riggins and Rafael Rosado	February 10, 1996
The Anderson family goes to the state fair. Ora competes in a cooking contest against Sally Tubbs (Shelley Long), Andy wrestles a greased pig, and Tommy is upset because Louie only takes him on the kiddie rides.
12	12	"Born a Rambler Man"	Matthew O'Callaghan	Alex Taub	Jorge Burge, Steve Lumley, Mark Mulgrew and Robert Smit	February 17, 1996
When Andy's Rambler gets damaged, Ora buys him a new car for his birthday. After Andy complains and returns the car, Louie fixes the Rambler with the help of a repairman named Smitty to use it in one more Veterans Day parade.

=== Season 2 (1996–1997) ===
No. overall	No. in season	Title	Directed by	Written by	Storyboard by	Original release date
13	1	"Caddy on a Hot Tin Roof"	Bert Ring	Alex Taub	Rafael Rosado and Mark Zoeller	September 14, 1996
Louie needs some money and is hired by a golfer (Joe Pantoliano) to caddy a golf game.
14	2	"Summer of My Discontent"	Bert Ring	Alex Taub; Greg Cope; Sean Dwyer	Dan Fausett	September 21, 1996
Louie tries to escape Glen Glenn, so he joins the trip to Chakami camp. The bad news: Glen Glenn and his gang also join. While on a trip, Louie and Glen Glenn get lost inside a forest.
15	3	"Anderson Ski Weekend"	Bert Ring	Alex Taub; Natasha Hayworth; Matthew Negrete	Steve Lumley	September 28, 1996
Earl Grunewald is promoted to be a main worker of the tractor factory. While the Grunewald family goes for a ski trip, Louie pretends to be a ski master, so the Anderson family also joins.
16	4	"Roofless People"	Bert Ring	Mary Gray Rubin; David Silverman	Ken Mundie and Steve Lumley	October 5, 1996
A tornado attacks the Cedar Knoll, which makes Louie afraid of the tornado, so he stays in his room and does not want to leave until the cow, trapped on a tree because of the tornado, confronts him.
17	5	"How to Succeed in Washington Without Really Trying"	Bert Ring	R.P. Halke; Alex Taub	Steve Lumley and Gary Selvaggio	October 19, 1996
Louie's class must give a speech, and if someone wins, the class will go to Washington. Louie buys a speech from Glen Glenn, and he wins. Andy accompanies the trip because he is in a war with the president. After Andy tells Louie he must always tell the truth, Louie tells the truth about the speech.
18	6	"An Anderson Dozen"	Bert Ring	Mary Gray Rubin; David Silverman	Robert Gibbs and Steve Lumley	November 2, 1996
Ora gets a call from the doctor, telling her she will have a baby. Louie thinks that someone will leave the family if the baby is born, and he thinks it might be him. It is revealed in the end that the doctor made a mistake, and she is not pregnant.
19	7	"Buzz Stop"	Bert Ring	Alex Taub; Bernie Ancheta	Steve Lumley	November 9, 1996
Andy wants a bigger recreational vehicle than the Jensens', so he buys bees to make more money and becomes obsessed.
20	8	"The Masked Chess Boy"	Bert Ring	Bernie Ancheta; Alex Taub; Ed Driscoll	Ian Freedman and Steve Lumley	November 23, 1996
Louie learns he's so talented in playing chess that he writes to a chess competition. When Andy confronts him about people laughing at the chess players, Louie disguises himself as the Masked Chess Boy.
21	9	"For Pete's Sake"	Matthew O'Callaghan; Bert Ring	Marcy Gray Rubin (teleplay); David Silverman (teleplay); Alex Taub (teleplay)	Dan Fausett and Eric Fredrickson	December 25, 1996
While out shopping, Louie gets rescued from an accident by a homeless man named Pete (Brian Doyle-Murray), and he decides to keep him in the garage of his house.
22	10	"The Good, the Bad, & the Glenns"	Bert Ring	Natasha Hayworth; Matthew Negrete; Alex Taub	Robert Gibbs and Steve Lumley	December 27, 1996
Glen Glenn's mother, Jen Glenn, scares the entire town of Cedar Knoll with her loud voice. When she suddenly loses her voice and goes to the hospital, Cedar Knoll is happy, and Glen Glenn becomes pals with Louie.
23	11	"Kazoo's Coming to Dinner"	Bert Ring; Matthew O'Callaghan	Alex Taub	Dan Fausett and Eric Fredrickson	February 1, 1997
Louie idolizes a comedian who is Ora's ex-boyfriend, Marty Kazoo (Sid Caesar). Ora, however, is not too happy about the new friendship.
24	12	"Mr. Anderson's Opus"	Bert Ring; Matthew O'Callaghan	Alex Taub	Ken Mundie and Steve Lumley	February 15, 1997
Louie gets jealous because Jeannie has a crush on the new kid at school. Meanwhile, Andy and Ora are arguing about the date of their wedding anniversary.
25	13	"The Thank You Note"	Matthew O'Callaghan; Bert Ring	Alex Taub	Dan Fausett	February 22, 1997
For Louie's birthday, his grandma gives Louie a sweater she made for him. While trying to write the thank you letter, Louie plays with his friends instead. When he finally writes the letter, he finds out his grandma has died.

=== Season 3 (1997–1998) ===
No. overall	No. in season	Title	Directed by	Written by	Storyboard by	Original release date
26	1	"Louie's Gate"	Bert Ring	Alex Taub	Art Mawhinney and Roy Muerin	September 6, 1997
A new movie theater opens, and Louie always goes there, so Andy and Ora become worried. They decide to give him a movie camera, which causes Louie to decide to shoot a movie.
27	2	"The Making of a President"	Bert Ring	Marcy Gray Rubin; David Silverman	Steve Lumley, Marc O'Hare and Chris York	September 13, 1997
Louie and Mike Grunewald try to win a school election by lying about others.
28	3	"Military Reunion"	Matthew O'Callaghan	Robert Rabinowitz	Steve Lumley, Mark O'Hare and Gary Scott	September 20, 1997
Louie does not want to listen anymore to Andy's war stories. While at the Military Reunion, Andy admits to Louie he was called Corporal Keister and that he was a cook, though his friends from the military insist that he did save them.
29	4	"Go Packers!"	Matthew O'Callaghan	Marcy Gray Rubin (teleplay); David Silverman (teleplay)	Steve Lumley and Art Mawhinney	September 27, 1997
Andy takes Louie to the Packers game.
30	5	"The Undergraduate"	Bert Ring	Bruce Clark; Marc Peterson	John Dubiel, Steve Lumley, Gary Scott, Mark Sonntag and Doug McCarthy	October 11, 1997
When Louie's teacher gets ill, Louie gets a crush on the replacement teacher. Louie begins reading Shakespeare, much to Andy's chagrin. Andy tries to order the principal to fire Mrs. Robertson, the replacement teacher. Mrs. Robertson explains that she is from a military family and that Andy got her a job at the military academy.
31	6	"Louie's Harrowing Halloween"	Bert Ring	Alex Taub	Eric Fredrickson	October 25, 1997
While shopping, Louie steals candy and tries to get rid of it during Halloween.
32	7	"Mr. Louie's Wild Ride"	Bert Ring	Shawn Ryan	Eric Fredrickson, Mark O'Hare and Keith Tucker	November 1, 1997
The Anderson family goes to Snifferland for their vacation. After arrival, they learn Snifferland moved to Orlando, Florida.
33	8	"Close Encounters of the Louie Kind"	Bert Ring	Alex Zamm	Craig Berman, Eric Fredrickson and Art Mawhinney	November 8, 1997
Louie and Mike create a spaceship, which causes Andy to be declared ambassador of the Earth.
34	9	"The Kiss Is the Thing"	Matthew O'Callaghan	Mike Gandolfi (teleplay); Matthew O'Callaghan (teleplay)	Steve Lumley	November 15, 1997
Louie must play the prince for the school performance about Sleeping Beauty. Meanwhile, Andy replaces his boss.
35	10	"Family Portrait"	Matthew O'Callaghan	Shawn Ryan (teleplay)	John Dubiel, Eric Fredrickson, Martin Lee Fuller and Jim Kammerud	December 20, 1997
Louie learns one of his friends is an orphan and invites him to his house for Christmas.
36	11	"Blinded by Love"	Matthew O'Callaghan	David Silverman; Marcy Gray Rubin	Eric Fredrickson, Steve Lumley, Art Mawhinney and Mark Sonntag	February 16, 1998
Louie wants to have a dog, much to Andy's chagrin. Louie takes a dog that has been trained to be a guide for people who are blind.
37	12	"Do It or Donut"	Bert Ring	Mike Gandolfi (teleplay); Matthew O'Callaghan (teleplay)	Eric Fredrickson, Steve Lumley and Art Mawhinney	February 23, 1998
Louie feels he is good at basketball, and Andy tries to support him. Ora decides to eat healthy food.
38	13	"Project: Mother's Day"	Bert Ring	Shawn Ryan	John Dubiel, Martin Lee Fuller, Jim Kammerud and Tom Riggin	March 2, 1998
In the series finale, Andy's mother comes to visit for Mother's Day. Meanwhile, Ora gets sick, and Louie does all of her jobs, so he does not have time to buy her gift for Mother's Day.

== Intro and theme song ==
The show's introduction for Seasons 2 and 3 involved the main character running toward a TV set, turning one of the set's dials, and showing a live-action video of Louie Anderson as an adult saying, "Let me tell you about my family." This was followed by clips of the show from Andy Anderson being pulled by sled dogs, Louie sticking chopsticks in his nose, to Louie jumping off a diving board at a swimming pool, nearly wasting all the water and getting most of the other participants wet due to the fact of him being overweight. Then, the show's logo (in pink) appeared on the bottom left-hand corner of the screen, while the main character (wearing sunglasses) ate a dot while sitting on a raft and watching TV on a tire. Season 1 episodes used a live-action intro by Louie Anderson, talking to the audience about his childhood, then dissolving into the show.

== Home media and merchandise ==
Due to the popularity of the show, various merchandise was released including apparel, videos of various episodes, a "Lake Winnibigoshish" CD-ROM, comic book, and a book series for children. The book series was based on the show's various episodes and contained six books. Kids' meal toys were also produced for several fast-food restaurant chains including Taco Bell (1996), Hardee's (1997), Jack in the Box (1997), and Dairy Queen (1999).

For a time, Life with Louie-branded SpaghettiOs, in character shapes, were available.

In early January 2006, TVShowsOnDVD.com posted a news story that Life with Louie was going to be released on DVD in the US. The information came from Louie Anderson, who mentioned this news on a radio program he was a guest on, KQRS-FM. There has been no other news since then, and it is now unknown if this series will be released on DVD in the United States since Anderson's death in 2022. However, three 2-episode sets were released in the United Kingdom in summer 2007 as Life with Louie: Volume 1, 2, and 3. The sets were released through Boulevard Entertainment as part of the Jetix programming brand.

== Awards ==
The series won two Emmy Awards. It also won the Humanitas Prize three times, more than any other animated series.

- Emmy Award for Outstanding Sound Editing - Special Class - Rick Hinson, Rick Hammel, Les Wolf Thomas Syslo and Timothy Borquez - 1996 (nominated)
- Emmy Award for Outstanding Sound Mixing - Special Class - Timothy Borquez and Dan Hiland - 1996 (nominated)
- Emmy Award for Outstanding Performer in an Animated Program - Louie Anderson - 1997
- Emmy Award for Outstanding Performer in an Animated Program - Louie Anderson - 1998
- Emmy Award for Outstanding Sound Mixing - Special Class - Timothy Borquez, Timothy J. Garrity and Brad Brock - 1998 (nominated)
- Emmy Award for Outstanding Outstanding Sound Editing - Special Class - Timothy Borquez, Rick Hinson, and Eric Freeman - 1998 (nominated)
- Emmy Award for Outstanding Performer in an Animated Program - Louie Anderson - 1999 (nominated)
- Emmy Award for Outstanding Special Class Animated Program - 1999 (nominated)
- Genesis Award for ethical treatment of animals - 1997
- Humanitas Prize for Children's Animation - 1996
- Humanitas Prize for Children's Animation - 1997
- Humanitas Prize for Children's Animation - 1998
