= 24th Daytime Emmy Awards =

- Date: May 21, 1997
- Location: Radio City Music Hall, New York City
- Presented by: National Academy of Television Arts and Sciences
- Hosted by: Susan Lucci; Regis Philbin

Highlights
- Outstanding Drama Series: General Hospital
- Outstanding Game Show: The Price is Right

Television/radio coverage
- Network: ABC

The 24th Daytime Emmy Awards were held on May 21, 1997, at Radio City Music Hall, New York City to commemorate excellence in daytime programming from the previous year (1996). The Lifetime Achievement award was presented to Fred Rogers by RuPaul.

Winners in each category are in bold.

== Outstanding Drama Series ==
- All My Children: Francesca James
- Days of Our Lives: Ken Corday
- **General Hospital**: Wendy Riche
- The Young and the Restless: William J. Bell & Edward J. Scott

== Outstanding Lead Actor in a Drama Series ==
- Peter Bergman (Jack Abbott, The Young and the Restless)
- Eric Braeden (Victor Newman, The Young and the Restless)
- David Canary (Adam Chandler/Stuart Chandler, All My Children)
- **Justin Deas (Buzz Cooper, Guiding Light)**
- Anthony Geary (Luke Spencer, General Hospital)

== Outstanding Lead Actress in a Drama Series ==
- Jensen Buchanan (Vicky Hudson, Another World)
- Genie Francis (Laura Spencer, General Hospital)
- Susan Lucci (Erica Kane, All My Children)
- **Jess Walton (Jill Abbott, The Young and the Restless)**

== Outstanding Supporting Actor in a Drama Series ==
- Maurice Benard (Sonny Corinthos, General Hospital)
- **Ian Buchanan (James Warwick, The Bold and the Beautiful)**
- Stuart Damon (Alan Quartermaine, General Hospital)
- Brad Maule (Tony Jones, General Hospital)
- Aaron Lustig (Tim Reid, The Young and the Restless)
- Scott Reeves (Ryan McNeil, The Young and the Restless)

== Outstanding Supporting Actress in a Drama Series ==
- Eva La Rue (Maria Santos, All My Children)
- Vanessa Marcil (Brenda Barrett, General Hospital)
- Victoria Rowell (Drucilla Winters, The Young and the Restless)
- **Michelle Stafford (Phyllis Romalotti, The Young and the Restless)**
- Jacklyn Zeman (Bobbie Spencer, General Hospital)

== Outstanding Younger Actor in a Drama Series ==
- Steve Burton (Jason Morgan, General Hospital)
- Jonathan Jackson (Lucky Spencer, General Hospital)
- **Kevin Mambo (Marcus Williams, Guiding Light)**
- Shemar Moore (Malcolm Winters, The Young and the Restless)
- Joshua Morrow (Nicholas Newman, The Young and the Restless)

== Outstanding Younger Actress in a Drama Series ==
- **Sarah Brown (Carly Roberts, General Hospital)**
- Sharon Case (Sharon Newman, The Young and the Restless)
- Christie Clark (Carrie Brady, Days of Our Lives)
- Kimberly McCullough (Robin Scorpio, General Hospital)
- Heather Tom (Victoria Newman, The Young and the Restless)

== Outstanding Drama Series Writing Team ==
- **All My Children**
- Days of Our Lives
- General Hospital
- **The Young and the Restless**

== Outstanding Drama Series Directing Team ==
- All My Children
- Days of Our Lives
- General Hospital
- **The Young and the Restless**

== Outstanding Talk Show ==
- **The Oprah Winfrey Show**

== Outstanding Talk show Host ==
- **Rosie O'Donnell (The Rosie O'Donnell Show)**
- Oprah Winfrey (The Oprah Winfrey Show)
- Leeza Gibbons (Leeza)
- Regis Philbin and Kathie Lee Gifford (Live with Regis & Kathie Lee)
- Montel Williams (The Montel Williams Show)

== Outstanding Game Show ==
- **The Price is Right**
- Debt
- Wheel of Fortune
- Jeopardy!
- Secrets of the Cryptkeeper's Haunted House

== Outstanding Game Show Host ==
- **Pat Sajak** (Wheel of Fortune)
- Bob Barker (The Price is Right)
- Al Roker (Remember This?)
- Alex Trebek (Jeopardy!)

== Outstanding Performer In An Animated Program ==
- **Louie Anderson (Louis Anderson and Andy Anderson, Life with Louie)**
- Lily Tomlin (Valerie Felicity Frizzle, The Magic School Bus)
- Dennis Franz (Captain Klegghorn, Mighty Ducks)
- Rita Moreno (Carmen Sandiego, Where on Earth Is Carmen Sandiego?)
- Rob Paulsen (Pinky, Pinky and the Brain)

== Outstanding Children's Animated Program ==
- **Steven Spielberg, Liz Holzman, Rusty Mills, Peter Hastings, Tom Ruegger, Charles Visser, Andrea Romano, Audu Paden, Jon McClenahan, Randy Rogel, John P. McCann, Paul Rugg and Nick Dubois (Animaniacs)**
- Steven Spielberg, Tom Ruegger, Peter Hastings, Liz Holzman, Rusty Mills, Andrea Romano, Kirk Tingblad, Charles Visser, Brett Baer, Dave Finkel, Earl Kress, Wendell Morris, Tom Sheppard and Charles M. Howell IV (Pinky and the Brain)
- George Newall, Tom Yohe and Radford Stone (Schoolhouse Rock!)
- Michael Hirsh, Patrick Loubert, Kristin Laskas Martin, Alison Blank, Jane Startz, Clive A. Smith, Karen Stevens, Patricia R. Burns, Stephen Hodgins, Vince Commisso, Charles E. Bastien, George Arthur Bloom, Jocelyn Stevenson and Susan Blu (The Magic School Bus)
- Andy Heyward, Michael Maliani, Robby London, Stacey Gallishaw, Emily Wensel, Margaret M. Dean, Sean Roche, Renee Toporzysek, Stan Phillips and Marsha Goodman (Where on Earth Is Carmen Sandiego?)

== Outstanding Music Direction and Composition ==
- **Richard Stone, Steven Bernstein and Julie Bernstein (Animaniacs)**
- Robby Merkin, Danny Epstein, Michael Abbott, Christopher Cerf, Sarah Durkee, Paul Jacobs, Gail 'Sky' King, Stephen Lawrence, Howard Marren, Steven Nelson, Fernando, Terry Mike Jeffrey, Dave Conner, Jeff Moss and Tony Geiss (Sesame Street)
- Bodie Chandler, Gary Lionelli, Thomas Chase, Steve Rucker, Larry Brown, Guy Moon, Kevin Kiner and Mark Koval (The Real Adventures of Jonny Quest)
- Stephen James Taylor (Timon & Pumbaa)

== Outstanding Special Class Animated Program ==
- **Steven Spielberg, Tom Ruegger, Rich Arons, John P. McCann, Paul Rugg, Mitch Schauer, Ronnie del Carmen, Jack Heiter, Scott Jeralds, Eric Radomski, Dan Riba, Andrea Romano and Peter Shin (Freakazoid!)**
- Bob Goodman, Jean MacCurdy, Alan Burnett, Paul Dini, Bruce W. Timm, Dan Riba, Andrea Romano, Stan Berkowitz and Hilary Bader (Superman: The Animated Series)
- Robby London, Andy Heyward, Michael Maliani, Pancho Kohner, Saul Cooper, Stacey Gallishaw, Judy Rothman Rofé, Stan Phillips and Marsha Goodman (The New Adventures of Madeline)

== Outstanding Individual in Animation ==
- **Barbara Schade (The Magic Pearl)**
- **Kexx Singleton (Timon & Pumbaa - "Beethoven's Whiff")**

== Outstanding Sound Editing ==
- **Thomas McGurk, Michael McAuliffe and Dave Howe (Bill Nye the Science Guy)**
- Jason King, Raymond E. Spiess III, William H. Angarola, Anna MacKenzie, Denise Brady, Cindy Rabideau, Mark Cookson, Andrew I. King, Ray Spiess and Robert Guastini (Flipper)
- Robert L. Manahan, James Perry, Jeff Boydstun, Andrew Somers, Edward Gomez and Dave Burke (Beakman's World)

== Outstanding Sound Editing - Special Class ==
- **Paca Thomas, Nick Carr, Marc S. Perlman, Kris Daly, Melissa Ellis, Phyllis Ginter, Eric Hertsguaard, Paul Holzborn, Jennifer Mertens, William Griggs, Jeff Hutchins, Kenneth Young, Bill Kean, David Lynch and Otis Van Osten (Mighty Ducks)**
- Debra Ruby, Marty Stein, Rick Hinson, Anthony Torretto, Chris Fradkin and Greg Pusateri (The Spooktacular New Adventures of Casper)
- Marty Stein, Anthony Torretto, Chris Fradkin, Rick Hinson and Maciek Malish (The Tick)
- David Browning and Dick Maitland (Sesame Street)
- Bill Kean, Thomas A. Harris, Fil Brown, David Lynch, Robbi Smith, Brian F. Mars, Eric Hertsguaard, Kris Daly, Michael Warner, Phyllis Ginter, William Griggs and Jennifer Mertens (Timon & Pumbaa)

== Outstanding Sound Mixing ==
- **Jon Taylor, Kevin Patrick Burns, Todd Orr and Craig Walmsley (Flipper)**
- Dave Howe, Michael McAuliffe, Resti Bagcal, Myron Partman and Thomas McGurk (Bill Nye the Science Guy)

== Outstanding Sound Mixing - Special Class ==
- **Deb Adair, Jim Hodson, Melissa Ellis, Michael Beiriger, Dan Hiland, Joseph D. Citarella, Allen L. Stone and Michael Jiron (Timon & Pumbaa)**
- Deb Adair, John Boyd, Stuart Calderon and Harry Andronis (The Spooktacular New Adventures of Casper)
- Deb Adair, Rick Hinson, John Boyd and Stuart Calderon (The Tick)
- Jim Hodson, Joseph D. Citarella, Allen L. Stone, Michael Jiron, Melissa Ellis, Dan Hiland and Deb Adair (Mighty Ducks)
- Blake Norton and Dick Maitland (Sesame Street)

== Outstanding Single Camera Editing ==
- **Darrell Suto, Michael Gross, Felicity Oram and John Reul (Bill Nye the Science Guy)**
- Michael Chomet, Richard A. Fernandes and Tony Breuer (Reading Rainbow)
- Barry Rubinow and Mark Walters (Beakman's World)
- Maureen Fahey (Home Again with Bob Vila)
- Bill Howe (This Old House)

== Outstanding Writing in a Children's Series ==
- **Kit Boss, Erren Gottlieb, Michael Gross, James McKenna, Bill Nye, Ian G. Saunders, Scott Schaefer and Darrell Suto (Bill Nye the Science Guy)**
- Richard Albrecht, Casey Keller, Marijane Miller, Barry Friedman and Mark Waxman (Beakman's World)
- Fred Rogers (Mister Rogers' Neighborhood)
- Lee Hunkins, Ronnie Krauss (Reading Rainbow)
- Norman Stiles, Lou Berger, Luis Santeiro, Nancy Sans, Christine Ferraro, John Weidman, Belinda Ward, Adam Rudman, Molly Boylan, Annie Evans, Ian Ellis James, Emily Perl Kingsley, Jeff Moss, Mo Willems, Tony Geiss, David Korr, Sonia Manzano, Judy Freudberg, Cathi Turow, Sara Compton, Josh Selig and Joey Mazzarino (Sesame Street)

== Outstanding Directing in a Children's Series ==
- **Darrell Suto, Michael Gross, Erren Gottlieb and James McKenna (Bill Nye the Science Guy)**
- Jay Dubin (Beakman's World)
- Ed Wiseman, Mark Mannucci and Kevin Lombard (Reading Rainbow)
- Emily Squires, Ted May, and Lisa Simon (Sesame Street)
- David Turner (Where in Time Is Carmen Sandiego?)

== Outstanding Children's Series ==
- **Reading Rainbow**
- Beakman's World
- Bill Nye the Science Guy
- Nick News with Linda Ellerbee
- Where in Time Is Carmen Sandiego?

== Lifetime achievement award ==
- **Fred Rogers**
