= 27th Daytime Emmy Awards =

- Date: May 19, 2000 (Ceremony); May 13 (Creative Arts Awards)
- Location: Radio City Music Hall, New York City
- Presented by: National Academy of Television Arts and Sciences
- Hosted by: Susan Lucci

Highlights
- Outstanding Drama Series: General Hospital
- Outstanding Game Show: Who Wants to Be a Millionaire

Television/radio coverage
- Network: ABC

The 27th Daytime Emmy Awards were held in 2000 to commemorate excellence in daytime programming from the previous year (1999).

Winners in each category are in bold.

== Outstanding Drama Series ==
- All My Children
- **General Hospital**
- One Life to Live
- The Young and the Restless

== Outstanding Lead Actor ==
- Peter Bergman (Jack Abbott, The Young and the Restless)
- Eric Braeden (Victor Newman, The Young and the Restless)
- David Canary (Adam Chandler/Stuart Chandler, All My Children)
- **Anthony Geary** (Luke Spencer, General Hospital)
- Robert S. Woods (Bo Buchanan, One Life to Live)

== Outstanding Lead Actress ==
- Jeanne Cooper (Katherine Chancellor, The Young and the Restless)
- **Susan Flannery** (Stephanie Forrester, The Bold and the Beautiful)
- Finola Hughes (Alex Devane, All My Children)
- Hillary B. Smith (Nora Buchanan, One Life to Live)
- Jess Walton (Jill Abbott, The Young and the Restless)

== Outstanding Supporting Actor ==
- Steve Burton (Jason Morgan, General Hospital)
- Timothy Gibbs (Kevin Buchanan, One Life to Live)
- Christian LeBlanc (Michael Baldwin, The Young and the Restless)
- **Shemar Moore** (Malcolm Winters, The Young and the Restless)
- Kristoff St. John (Neil Winters, The Young and the Restless)

== Outstanding Supporting Actress ==
- **Sarah Brown** (Carly Quartermaine, General Hospital)
- Sharon Case (Sharon Newman, The Young and the Restless)
- Patrika Darbo (Nancy Wesley, Days of Our Lives)
- Nancy Lee Grahn (Alexis Davis, General Hospital)
- Tonya Lee Williams (Olivia Winters, The Young and the Restless)

== Outstanding Younger Actor ==
- Jensen Ackles (Eric Brady, Days of Our Lives)
- Jonathan Jackson (Lucky Spencer, General Hospital)
- Bryant Jones (Nate Hastings, The Young and the Restless)
- David Lago (Raul Guittierez, The Young and the Restless)
- Joshua Morrow (Nicholas Newman, The Young and the Restless)
- **David Tom** (Billy Abbott, The Young and the Restless)

== Outstanding Younger Actress ==
- Adrienne Frantz (Amber Moore, The Bold and the Beautiful)
- **Camryn Grimes** (Cassie Newman, The Young and the Restless)
- Ashley Jones (Megan Dennison, The Young and the Restless)
- Heather Tom (Victoria Newman, The Young and the Restless)
- Erin Torpey (Jessica Buchanan, One Life to Live)

== Outstanding Drama Series Writing Team ==
- As the World Turns
- The Bold and the Beautiful
- General Hospital
- **The Young and the Restless**

== Outstanding Drama Series Directing Team ==
- All My Children
- The Bold and the Beautiful
- **General Hospital**
- Sunset Beach
- The Young and the Restless

== Outstanding Game/Audience Participation Show ==
- Hollywood Squares
- Jeopardy!
- The Price is Right
- **Who Wants to Be a Millionaire**
- Win Ben Stein's Money

== Outstanding Game Show Host ==
- **Bob Barker, The Price is Right**
- **Tom Bergeron, Hollywood Squares**
- Regis Philbin, Who Wants to Be a Millionaire
- Pat Sajak, Wheel of Fortune
- Alex Trebek, Jeopardy!

== Outstanding Talk Show ==
- Donny & Marie
- Live with Regis and Kathie Lee
- The Martin Short Show
- **The Rosie O'Donnell Show**
- The View

== Outstanding Talk Show Host ==
- **Rosie O'Donnell, The Rosie O'Donnell Show**
- Regis Philbin and Kathie Lee Gifford, Live with Regis and Kathie Lee
- Barbara Walters, Meredith Vieira, Star Jones, Joy Behar and Lisa Ling, The View
- Donny Osmond and Marie Osmond, Donny & Marie
- Martin Short, The Martin Short Show

== Outstanding Performer In An Animated Program ==
- **James Woods (Hades, Hercules: The Animated Series)**
- Nathan Lane (George, George and Martha)
- Pam Grier (The Nightingale, Happily Ever After: Fairy Tales for Every Child: The Empress' Nightingale)
- Robert Guillaume (Narrator, Happily Ever After: Fairy Tales for Every Child: The Empress' Nightingale)
- French Stewart (Icarus, Hercules: The Animated Series)

== Outstanding Performer in a Children's Special ==
- **James Earl Jones (Dr. William 'Bill' Blakely, Summer's End)**
- Debbie Reynolds (Shirlee Allison, A Gift of Love: The Daniel Huffman Story)
- Marc Donato (Stephen Locked, Locked in Silence)
- Bonnie Bedelia (Lydia, Locked in Silence)
- Hume Cronyn (Mr. John McRae, Sea People)

== Outstanding Sound Editing ==
- **Dave Howe, Michael McAuliffe, and Thomas McGurk (Bill Nye, the Science Guy)**
- Michael Ruschak, and Philippe Desloovere (30 by 30: Kid Flicks)
- William H. Angarola, Mike Marchain, Anna MacKenzie, Robert Guastini, Cindy Rabideau, Ray Spiess, Rick Hinson, and Warren Smith (The Devil's Arithmetic)
- Jeffrey Boydstun, Jim Perry, and Rita Egleston (The Phantom Eye)

== Outstanding Sound Mixing ==
- **Peter Hefter, and John Alberts (Bear in the Big Blue House)**
- **Dave Howe, Michael McAuliffe, Thomas McGurk, Myron Partman, and Resti Bagcal (Bill Nye, the Science Guy)**
- **Bill Thiederman, Dean Okrand, Mike Brooks, and Clancy Livingston (Honey, I Shrunk the Kids: The TV Show)**
- Robert Montrone, and Bill Baggett (Martha Stewart Living)
- Richard Bock, Dan Lesiw, and Jeff Scornavacca (Zoom)

== Outstanding Sound Mixing - Special Class ==
- **Benoît Coaillier (Arthur)**
- Fil Brown and Melissa Ellis (Men in Black: The Series)
- Tom Maydeck, Robert Hargreaves and John Hegedes (Batman Beyond)
- Dick Maitland and Blake Norton (Sesame Street)

== Outstanding Children's Series ==
- **James McKenna, Erren Gottlieb, Elizabeth Brock, Jamie Hammond, and Bill Nye (Bill Nye, the Science Guy)**
- Carol Tomko Recka, John Stainton, and Judy Bailey (The Crocodile Hunter)
- Linda Ellerbee, Rolfe Tessem, Mark Lyons, and Wally Berger (Nick News with Linda Ellerbee)
- Peter Engel, Bennett Tramer, Tony Soltis, Chris Conte, Paul Dell, and Steven Weiss (Saved by the Bell: The New Class)
- Kate Taylor, Jonathan G. Meath, Marisa Wolsky, Jim Johnston (Zoom)

== Outstanding Writing in a Children's Series ==
- **Bill Nye, Michael Gross, Darrell Suto, Ian G. Saunders, Michael Palleschi, Lynn Brunelle, and Mike Greene (Bill Nye, the Science Guy)**
- Angela Santomero, Adam Peltzman, Michael Smith, Alice Wilder, Jessica Lissy (Blue's Clues)
- Fred Rogers (Mister Rogers' Neighborhood)
- Linda Ellerbee, Walt McGraw (Nick News with Linda Ellerbee)
- Lou Berger, Molly Boylan, Sara Compton, Annie Evans, Chrissy Ferraro, Judy Freudberg, Tony Geiss, Ian Ellis James, Emily Perl Kingsley, David Korr, Sonia Manzano, Joey Mazzarino, Jeff Moss, Cathi Turow, Adam Rudman, Nancy Sans, Luis Santeiro, Josh Selig, Belinda Ward, John Weidman, and Mo Willems (Sesame Street)

== Outstanding Directing in a Children's Series ==
- Nancy Keegan, Alan Zdinak, and Mitchell Kriegman (Blue's Clues)
- **Michael Gross, Darrell Suto, and Mitchell Kriegman (Bill Nye, the Science Guy)**
- Ted May, Emily Squires, Reggie Life, Steve Feldman, Victor DiNapoli, Mitchell Kriegman (Sesame Street)
- Jesse Collins, Mitchell Kriegman (Zoboomafoo)

== Lifetime achievement award ==
- **Barbara Walters**
