= Deb Adair =

American re-recording mixer

Deb Adair (born April 22, 1966, in Manchester, Connecticut) is an American re-recording mixer. She won 3 Emmy Awards for Outstanding Film Sound Mixing and Outstanding Sound Mixing - Special Class for her work on Aladdin in 1995-1996 and Timon & Pumbaa in 1997. On January 24, 2012, she was nominated for an Academy Award for the movie Moneyball.

Adair attended Syracuse University in the TV, Radio, and Film Production program.

== See also ==
- 84th Academy Awards
