= Louie Anderson =

American stand-up comedian (1953–2022)

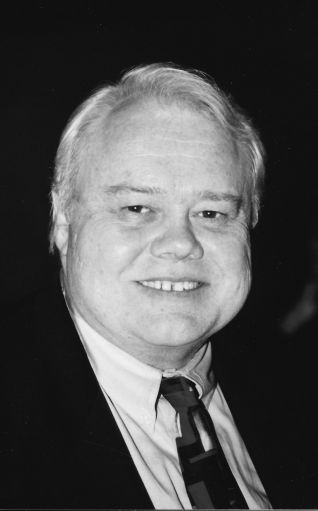
- Anderson in 2001
- Born: Louis Perry Anderson; March 24, 1953; Saint Paul, Minnesota, U.S.
- Died: January 21, 2022 (aged 68); Las Vegas, Nevada, U.S.
- Occupations: Stand-up comedian; actor; author; game show host
- Spouses: Diane Jean Vono (m. 1984; div. 1984) Norma J. Walker (m. 1985; div. 1985)

Comedy career
- Years active: 1983–2022
- Medium: Stand-up, television, film
- Genres: Observational comedy; clean comedy; deadpan; satire
- Website: louieanderson.com

Louis Perry Anderson (March 24, 1953 – January 21, 2022) was an American stand-up comedian, actor, author and game show host. He created the cartoon series Life with Louie and the television sitcom The Louie Show, and wrote four books, including Hey Mom: Stories for My Mother, But You Can Read Them Too, which was published in 2018. Anderson was the third host of the game show Family Feud from 1999 to 2002 — the first host in its third and current run.

For his performance on the FX comedy television series Baskets, Anderson received three consecutive Primetime Emmy Award for Outstanding Supporting Actor in a Comedy Series nominations and won once in 2016.

Anderson performed a stand-up show called Louie: Larger Than Life in Las Vegas, Nevada, from 2003 through 2012. The show originated at the Union Plaza hotel downtown, before moving to Excalibur, South Point, and Palace Station hotels.

== Early life ==
Anderson was born and raised in Saint Paul, Minnesota, the son of Ora Zella (née Prouty; 1912–1990), a Mayflower descendant, and Louis William Anderson (1901–1980). His father was a trumpeter for singer Hoagy Carmichael. Anderson was the second youngest of 11 children in his family. In a 2016 interview on WTF with Marc Maron, Anderson revealed that his mother actually gave birth to 16 children, but five of them—the first baby and then two sets of twins—died at birth. Anderson described his father as an abusive alcoholic.

Anderson attended Johnson Senior High in Saint Paul.

== Career ==
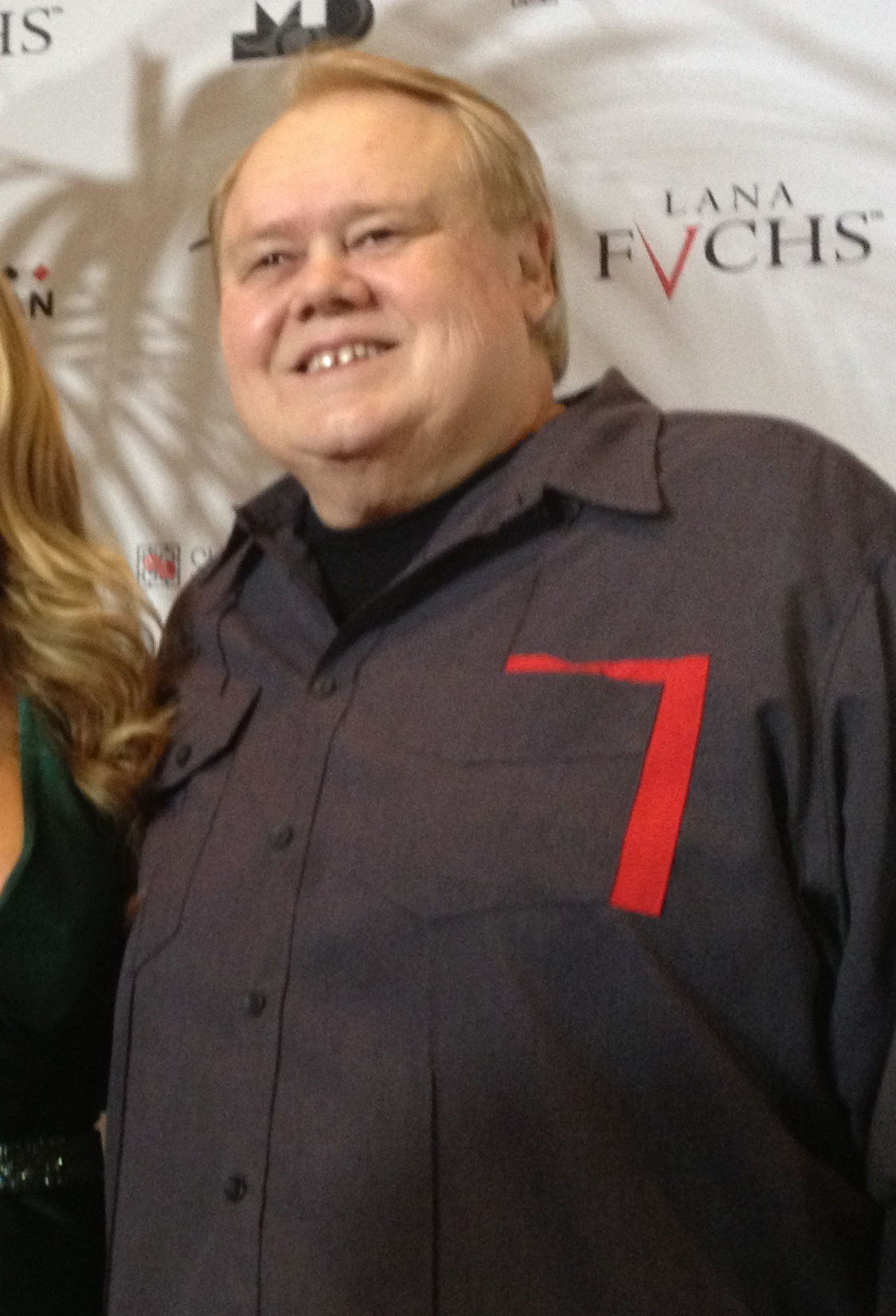
Anderson at the 2012 Sin City Rules Premiere Party

Anderson made his television debut on January 13, 1984, on Rodney Dangerfield's Young Comedians Special on HBO.

=== 1980s ===
Anderson made his first movie appearance alongside Dabney Coleman in the movie Cloak and Dagger as taxi driver #2 (released July 13, 1984), a small role with one line. On November 20, 1984, Anderson made his network debut as a comedian on The Tonight Show. In late 1985, Anderson was cast as Lou Appleton alongside Bronson Pinchot on the pilot episode of Perfect Strangers for ABC (which was known in this early stage as The Greenhorn). When the show was picked up, Anderson was replaced by Mark Linn-Baker in the role of Appleton (whose first name was then changed from Lou to Larry) as the producers did not think the chemistry between Anderson and Pinchot was quite right. The show ran for eight seasons on ABC. Anderson had a small role in the singing-telegram scene in Ferris Bueller's Day Off, as well as appearing in a comedy special on Showtime.

Anderson also played a role in John Landis' film Coming to America, which starred Eddie Murphy and Arsenio Hall, a role which he reprised in the 2021 sequel. Murphy requested Anderson be hired for Coming To America after producers wanted a white actor in the otherwise African-American cast; Murphy described his friend Anderson as "the funniest white guy around". Anderson also starred in the 1988 camp comedy The Wrong Guys, based on a story by John Hughes.

In 1989, Anderson guest-starred on the first episode of The Muppets television segment of The Jim Henson Hour.

=== 1990s ===
In 1995, Anderson created and produced a Saturday-morning animated series for Fox called Life with Louie. The series was based on his childhood with 10 siblings, a sweet-hearted mother and a loud, war-crazed father. It also detailed how Anderson was bullied for his weight, and how he used comedy to deal with the teasing. The show was a three-year hit on Fox, and won two Daytime Emmy Awards for Outstanding Performer in an Animated Program.

Anderson created and starred in The Louie Show for CBS. The show had him playing a psychotherapist in Duluth, Minnesota. The show ran six episodes before it was canceled.

Anderson was also the host of Comedy Showcase in the late 1990s.

Anderson landed the role of host of the new version of Family Feud in 1999. He wanted former Family Feud host Richard Dawson to appear on the premiere show to give him his blessing, but Dawson's manager turned down the offer on his behalf. In 2001, Anderson organized a 9/11-themed tournament week of Family Feud between the FDNY and the NYPD, putting up $75,000 toward both organizations for recovery from the September 11 attacks. Anderson was let go from the show in 2002 and was replaced by Richard Karn.

=== 2000s ===
In 2000, Anderson appeared as a panelist on an episode of To Tell the Truth hosted by John O'Hurley, and in 2001, he appeared on an episode of Weakest Link, winning $31,000. Anderson made appearances on network television in Scrubs, Grace Under Fire, Touched by an Angel (Then Sings My Soul, November 28, 1999), and Chicago Hope. He guest starred on the Adult Swim cameo-filled show Tom Goes to the Mayor.?

Anderson played in the 2006 World Series of Poker Main Event in Las Vegas, Nevada.

=== 2010s ===
Anderson filmed a standup special entitled Louie Anderson: Big Baby Boomer. In it, he poked fun at his bad habits, pesky family members, and aging body.

In 2013, Anderson appeared in the ABC reality television series Splash. After practicing several dives into a swimming pool then nearly drowning, he needed help getting out from co-star football player Ndamukong Suh. Anderson signed on as the promotional spokesperson for his home state's Land O'Lakes Sweet Cream butter brand. He appeared in radio jingles, web ads, and television commercials promoting the product.

From 2016 to 2019, Anderson played the part of Christine Baskets on the FX comedy series Baskets. Anderson won the 2016 Primetime Emmy Award for Outstanding Supporting Actor in a Comedy Series for his performance.

On July 23, 2017, Anderson competed on an episode of Celebrity Family Feud (hosted today by Steve Harvey); his opponent was singer/actress Christina Milian. This made Anderson one of only a small number of individuals to have both hosted and been a contestant on the same game show, and also marked his first appearance on any form of Family Feud since his departure as host in 2002. Anderson was a regular panelist on the TV game show Funny You Should Ask from September 2017 until the show went on hiatus in 2020.

== Stand-up style ==
Dennis Miller called him "one of the lightest on his feet comedians I know ... There's very few guys I'm going to leave my dressing room early (to watch). ... (Louie has) a Fred Astaire, with a broken leg, approach. Very quick thinking, and he wouldn't hammer points home, but he would do a 'weave-back' that was almost Pulp Fiction-like."

== Personal life ==
In 1984, Anderson married Diane Jean Vono; however, they divorced after four months. In 1985, Anderson married his high school sweetheart, Norma J. Walker. The marriage lasted only four weeks.

=== Blackmailing incident ===
In 1997, Anderson was blackmailed by Richard John Gordon, who threatened to tell tabloids that Anderson sexually propositioned him in a casino in 1993. In 1997 and 1998, Anderson paid Gordon $100,000 in hush money, fearing that the story would threaten his starring roles in two family-oriented series, but when Gordon's demands increased to $250,000 in 2000, Anderson's lawyer informed federal authorities. Gordon, who was 31 at the time, was arrested after leading FBI agents on a high-speed chase along Santa Monica Boulevard. Gordon was fined and sentenced to 21 months in prison.

=== Health ===
In 2003, Anderson underwent two successful heart procedures.

== Death ==
On January 18, 2022, it was announced that Anderson had been hospitalized in Las Vegas for large B-cell lymphoma; he had first been diagnosed with cancer a decade earlier, but kept the information private. Anderson died of complications from the cancer on January 21 at age 68.

== Filmography ==
=== Film ===
Year	Title	Role
1984	Cloak & Dagger	Taxi Driver #2
1986	Quicksilver	Tiny
1986	Ferris Bueller's Day Off	Flower Deliveryman
1986	Ratboy	Omer Morrison
1988	The Wrong Guys	Louie
1988	Coming to America	Maurice
1992	Bebe's Kids	Security Guard #1 (voice)
1996	Mr. Wrong	Himself
2002	Do It for Uncle Manny	Tow Truck Driver
2005	Back by Midnight	Game Show Host
2007	Cook Off!	Mayor Doug Halverson
2017	Sandy Wexler	Himself
2021	Coming 2 America	Maurice (final film role)

=== Television ===
Year	Title	Role	Notes
1984	9th Annual Young Comedians Special	Himself	Hosted by Rodney Dangerfield and featuring Anderson, Sam Kinison, Bob Saget, Rita Rudner, Yakov Smirnoff
1986–1988	The New Hollywood Squares	Himself	13 episodes
1986	Remington Steele	Bingham 'Bing' Perret	Episode: "Steele Spawning"
1987	Trying Times	Stu	Episode: "Bedtime Story"
1989	The Jim Henson Hour	Himself / Space Guy	Episode #1: "Outer Space/The Heartless Giant"
1994	Grace Under Fire	Dr. Andy Lewinson	Episode: "Tears of Joy"
1995–1998	Life with Louie	Andy Anderson / Little Louie (voice)	26 episodes Daytime Emmy Award for Outstanding Performer in an Animated Program (1996–97); Nominated—Daytime Emmy Award for Outstanding Performer in an Animated Program
1995	Love & War	James the Cat (voice)	Episode: "Something Old, Something New, Something Borrowed and a Cat"
1996	The Louie Show	Louie Lundgren	6 episodes
1997	Chicago Hope	Louie Lickman	Episode: "Growing Pains"
1997	Rodney Dangerfield's 75th Birthday Toast	Himself	Rodney Dangerfield introduced Louie to a national audience and Louie participated in this roast to honor and thank him
1999	Touched by an Angel	Uncle Dudley	Episode: "Then Sings My Soul"
1998–2002	Hollywood Squares	Himself	12 episodes
1999–2002	Family Feud	Himself / Host	
2000	To Tell the Truth	Himself / Panelist	
2000	Ally McBeal	Therapist	Episode: "Without a Net"
2001	Nash Bridges	Richard Reynolds	Episode: "Blood Bots"
2001	Scrubs	Himself	Episode: "My Two Dads"
2001	V.I.P.	Homeless Person	Episode: "Kayus Ex Machina"
2005	Half & Half	Louie	Episode: "The Big Credit Check Episode"
2005	Joey	Himself	Episode: "Joey and the Poker"
2006	The Grim Adventures of Billy & Mandy	Burt (voice)	Episode: "Fear and Loathing in Endsville"
2006	Tom Goes to the Mayor	Mining Team of Louie Andersons (voice)	Episode: "White Collarless"
2013	Splash	Himself	4 episodes, eliminated in week 5
2015–2017	Pickle and Peanut	Gory Agnes (voice)	2 episodes
2016–2019	Baskets	Christine Baskets	39 episodes Critics' Choice Television Award for Best Supporting Actor in a Comedy Series; Primetime Emmy Award for Outstanding Supporting Actor in a Comedy Series; Nominated—Primetime Emmy Award for Outstanding Supporting Actor in a Comedy Series (2017–18); Nominated—Satellite Award for Best Supporting Actor – Series, Miniseries or Television Film
2016	Drunk History	Winston Churchill	Episode: "The Roosevelts"
2017	Michael Bolton's Big, Sexy Valentine's Day Special	Himself	Television special
2017	Penn & Teller: Fool Us	Himself	Season 4, Episode 3 - "Teller Flips a Bird"
2017–2020	Funny You Should Ask	Himself	215 episodes
2019	Long Island Medium	Episode: "A Spirit Returns"	
2019	Who Wants to Be a Millionaire?	Player	Episode: 104
2020	Young Sheldon	Ralph	Episode: "An Academic Crime and a More Romantic Taco Bell"
2020	Search Party	Bob Lunch	5 episodes
2021	No Activity	(voice)	Episode: "40 Days & 40 Nights"
2021	Twenties	Maurice	2 episodes
2021–2022	Tig n' Seek	Chester (voice)	8 episodes (final/posthumous role)

=== Video games ===
Year	Title	Role	Notes
2000	Family Feud	Himself	

== Books ==
Anderson authored the following:

- Dear Dad: Letters from an Adult Child. Penguin. 1991. ISBN 978-0-1401-4845-9. A collection of letters to his late father
- Goodbye Jumbo... Hello Cruel World. Penguin. 1994. ISBN 978-0-1402-3368-1. A self-help book for those who struggle with self-esteem issues
- The F Word: How to Survive Your Family. Warner Books. 2002. ISBN 978-0-4465-3017-0. 49 family survival tips
- Hey Mom: Stories for My Mother, But You Can Read Them Too. Atria Books. April 3, 2018. ISBN 978-1-5011-8919-7.

Media offices
Preceded by Richard Dawson	Host of Family Feud; 1999–2002	Succeeded by Richard Karn
