= Harvey Cohen =

American composer and orchestrator (1951–2007)

- Born: Harvey R. Cohen; September 13, 1951; Brookline, Massachusetts
- Died: January 14, 2007 (aged 55); Agoura Hills, California
- Occupation: Composer

Harvey R. Cohen (September 13, 1951 – January 14, 2007) was an American composer and orchestrator.

== Career ==
Growing up in Boston, Cohen studied music at the University of Hartford and at the graduate level at Brooklyn College in New York City. He later studied with film composer Earle Hagen.

He received two Emmy Awards for Outstanding Music Direction and Composition in the animated television shows, The Adventures of Batman & Robin, episode "A Bullet for Bullock", and Disney's TV series Aladdin.

Cohen provided orchestration for numerous films, including South Park: Bigger, Longer & Uncut, Down With Love, The Patriot, Doug's 1st Movie, Naked Gun 33 1/3: The Final Insult, Sabrina, and All Dogs Go to Heaven. He also provided original music scores for Ghost Town (1988) and Santa vs. the Snowman 3D (2002). Television shows for which he wrote music include Sex and the City, The Wonder Years, and The New Batman Adventures. He also arranged music for such recording artists as Kenny G and The Irish Tenors.

== Death ==
Cohen died from a massive heart attack in January 2007, at the age of 55.
