= Michael Gross (editor) =

American television editor and director

Michael Gross is a television editor, writer, producer, and director. He lives and works in Seattle, Washington. He has worked on a number of television programs, including Bill Nye the Science Guy, Beakman's World, Adventure Divas, and Bands Reunited. Gross has won nine Daytime Emmy Awards.
