= Richard Stone (composer) =

American composer (1953–2001)

- Born: November 27, 1953; Philadelphia, Pennsylvania, U.S.
- Died: March 9, 2001 (aged 47); Los Angeles, California, U.S.
- Education: Curtis Institute of Music; Indiana University
- Occupation: Composer
- Years active: 1972–2001

Richard Stone (November 27, 1953 – March 9, 2001) was an American composer. He played an important part in the revival of Warner Bros. animation in the 1990s, composing music and songs for Looney Tunes, Tiny Toon Adventures, Taz-Mania, The Plucky Duck Show, Animaniacs, Pinky and the Brain, Pinky, Elmyra & the Brain, Histeria!, The Sylvester & Tweety Mysteries, Freakazoid!, and Road Rovers, as well as the Warner Bros. Family Entertainment fanfare. Many consider Stone to be an heir to the style of Carl W. Stalling.

After studying cello with Lloyd Smith and Orlando Cole in addition to music theory at the Curtis Institute of Music, Stone went on to earn a degree at Indiana University's Jacobs School of Music. In 1980, he moved to California to work as a music editor with such composers as Georges Delerue (on Platoon and other films) and Maurice Jarre (on Witness).

Stone went on to write music for various feature films and television series including the Bruce Campbell western Sundown: The Vampire in Retreat (1989), Tripwire (1989), Never on Tuesday (1989), Pumpkinhead (1988), North Shore (1987), Summer Heat (1987), and the 1991 miniseries In a Child's Name. Stone worked on John Hughes films including Ferris Bueller's Day Off and Sixteen Candles (both scored by Ira Newborn). Stone also composed the music for the William Shatner series, Rescue 911. Stone also scored the PBS Documentary "Medal of Honor" along with Mark Watters.

Stone won several Emmy Awards for Outstanding Music Direction and Composition for Animaniacs and Histeria, as well as Outstanding Original Song, shared with lyricist, writer, creator and senior producer Tom Ruegger, for the main titles of Animaniacs and Freakazoid!. Stone shared many of his music direction/composing awards with his team of composers, who included Steven Bernstein, Carl Johnson, Julie Bernstein, Gordon Goodwin, and Tim Kelly.

== Death ==
Stone died at his home in the West Hills area of Los Angeles on March 9, 2001, from pancreatic cancer at the age of 47. A memorial service was held in the Eastwood Scoring Stage at Warner Bros. Studios the following month.
