= List of The Magic School Bus characters =

This is a list of characters that appear in The Magic School Bus original series books (1986 - 2021), The Magic School Bus television series (1994 - 1997) and The Magic School Bus Rides Again (2017 - 2020).

== Main ==
The school is known as Walkerville Elementary, named after the fictional town of Walkerville, where it is located. The classic series books --which were the books by Joanna Cole and Bruce Degen-- had a larger number of students in Ms. Frizzle's class (19 instead of 8). However, 11 of those characters were omitted in the TV series, the TV tie-in books (based with the TV series), and the video game series.

=== Frizzle sisters ===
==== Valerie Felicity Frizzle ====
Valerie Felicity Frizzle (voiced by Lily Tomlin in the TV series, Tina Marie Goff in the games, Judy Graubart in the Scholastic Audio Tapes, and Polly Adams in the Scholastic Audio CDS and digital audio books) is a third to fifth grade teacher of Walkerville Elementary. In the first series she is normally referred to as "Miss Frizzle" or "Ms. Frizzle", but her students often call her the "Friz". While she is eccentric and somewhat strange, the Friz is very intelligent, kind, resourceful, happy, funny, supportive, loving and somewhat motherly. She loves making jokes revolving around the lesson she teaches, even if she is the only one laughing. She makes flamboyant entrances to start the class, causing some to remark "How does she do that?" A redhead, she wears wacky dresses that reflect the subject of each adventure and earrings that glow before a field trip begins. She usually winks before the earrings glow (in the original books, her dress on the last page usually hinted at the plot of the next book; the very last book sees it covered with question marks). She enjoys singing, seems unafraid of danger, and often refers to her relatives or ancestors during trips. She can make a lot of jokes like Carlos, and she also admires Carlos' jokes. She appears to be very attached to the bus, almost as if having a nostalgic connection to it. She also loves to surprise the students and although she denies that she knows everything, she seems to never be in the dark about her students' activities. To Arnold, she is strange, but he and his friends still love and respect her. Some of Ms. Frizzle's ongoing catchphrases are, "Bus, do your stuff!", "Take chances, make mistakes, get messy!", "Hit it Liz!", "As I always say...", "To the bus!" and “Wahoo!"

Valerie appears in The Magic School Bus Rides Again as "Professor Valerie Felicity Frizzle, Ph.D.", with Tomlin once again providing her voice. In this series, she answers phone calls in the call-in segments (replacing the producers scene in the original series) along with her pet monkey named Goldie, and usually gives some clue as to the topic of the next episode. Mostly, in the new series, she sometimes but not always shows up, and is always known for being shown at the ending.

==== Fiona Felicity Frizzle ====
Fiona Felicity Frizzle (voiced by Kate McKinnon) is Valerie Frizzle's younger sister and the class's new teacher. She borrows a lot of her sister's catchphrases; such as "Bus, do your stuff!", among many others. Similar to her sister, Valerie; her skirt and necklace often change each episode based on the topic. Just like her sister, Fiona often quotes random relatives and friends of hers; but she does not share all the same catchphrases (and does not fully share personalities) with her sister.

=== Liz ===
Liz (voiced by Catherine Thompson in the games) is the class pet Jackson's chameleon who goes on most of the field trips with Ms. Frizzle and the students, often getting herself into dangerous comedic situations. She appears to get a little jealous when the bus receives more attention than she does. In the episode "Gets Ants in its Pants", she is visibly annoyed and very disappointed when she does not get the recognition she deserves.

Liz is mute, but often does things that one would not expect from a chameleon in real life; such as driving the bus and her scales not changing color to match her surroundings. There are a few instances where she is heard making a sound. Two of these instances occurred during "Inside Ralphie". She yawned when Ms. Frizzle was on the phone with Ralphie's mother, and she sneezed when Ralphie saw the bus going through his nose. In "Wet All Over", she hyperventilated when trying to escape from the girls' bathroom. When she goes to Herp Haven for a brief period in "Cold Feet"; her packing list includes claw polish, scale moisturizer, and fang-paste. If Ms. Frizzle has to leave the students for a brief period for any reason or if the class must split up, she leaves Liz in charge, acting as a sort of substitute teacher. In "In a Pickle", she is the supposed "Judge" in Ms. Frizzle's trial for stealing Keesha's first prize cucumber/turning it into a pickle; she wears the wig, and the outfit, and carries the gavel.

While Liz is mute on the show, she speaks in the CD-ROMs (although it appears that only the player can hear her). She is also seen at the end of most episodes with the producers of the Magic School Bus.

Liz also appears in the disclaimers at the end of episodes in the TV show.

== Students ==
=== Narrator ===
The Narrator (voiced by Alice Playten in the Scholastic Audio Tapes, Cassandra Lee Moriss in the Scholastic Audio CDs and Digital Audiobooks, and Tony Sperry in the TW Kids Audio Adaptations) is the main character in the original series books, the books adapting the TV episodes and the audio adaptations, narrating the events happening. Its currently unknown who they are or what their name is.

Note: In the Scholastic Audio Tapes, the kids are voiced by various kids from PS 41 and Saint Ann's School (Brooklyn) in New York City.

=== Arnold Perlstein ===
Arnold Matthew Perlstein (voiced by Amos Crawley in Season 1, Danny Tamberelli in Seasons 2-4 in the original series, Miles Kolseci-Vieira and Roman Lutteroitti in The Magic School Bus Rides Again) is a bespectacled, Jewish-American boy. He is often seen as somewhat of a coward, but he is actually braver than he is given credit for (in "The Busasaurus", he scares off a T. Rex to save the class). Arnold also inspires the class with ideas, and they call him a genius. In the episode "Shows and Tells", he mentions that his great-aunt is the famous archaeologist "Arizona Joan", a parody of Indiana Jones. He frequently bemoans a lot and shows concern about Ms. Frizzle's wild field trips, but on several occasions, he proves himself fiercely loyal to the teacher herself, as in "Lost in Space" where he defends her against his cousin Janet. Another example of this is in "In a Pickle" where he acts as a lawyer for Ms. Frizzle, taking his job almost too seriously. He has an intense interest in and knowledge of rocks and minerals and an extensive rock collection. Because of this, he is the only child to be a member of Granite, the Great Rock Admirers' National Institute of Tectonics Experts ("Goes Cellular") in "Cracks a Yolk", he and Dorothy Ann share the only kiss on the series when she kisses him on the cheek. It is implied in the episodes "For Lunch" and "Holiday Special", that he is infatuated with Wanda and vice versa, but in "Wet All Over", he has a crush on a girl in another class named Tiffany. It is implied in "The Busasaurus" that Phoebe could be infatuated with him as well, though other episodes do not support this to the same degree that "The Busasaurus" does. In "Goes to Seed", he mentions he is allergic to pepper and pollen. In some episodes such as "In the City", he is known as the "Big Eater" of the show, because he's always hungry and likes food and eating all the time, just like Shaggy and Scooby-Doo. His middle name, Matthew, is mentioned in "Ms. Frizzle's Adventures: Medieval Castle". In most episodes, he usually says "I knew I should have stayed home today." or a variant of it. He has a very bossy, rude, know-it-all cousin, named Janet who often antagonizes Ms. Frizzle and the class; while Arnold often has trouble standing up to her demands, when things get very serious, he refuses to let Janet have her way. His favorite color is orange, revealed in "Makes a Rainbow" and "Goes Cellular".

=== Carlos Ramón ===
Carlos Ramon (voiced by Daniel DeSanto in the original series and Leke Maceda-Rustecki in The Magic School Bus Rides Again) is the Colombian-American class clown, always making a pun or joke about whatever situation the class is in. He is a hands-on learner, preferring to invent unique devices, such as a best-loved stuffed animal, an instrument or rain catcher, rather than learn from a book like Dorothy Ann. Carlos tries to be quite funny by telling several jokes, but they often only backfire and cause the kids to groan "Carlos!" in an aggravated manner. By contrast, Ms. Frizzle seems to really enjoy his jokes, sometimes even complimenting him on being observant in the process of making them up. He is very kind and outgoing, but he can sometimes also have a very bossy side as well. Despite this, Carlos is extremely good-hearted and has a brotherly instinct about him. In "The Magic School Bus Going Batty", his father also makes puns, to which the other kids' parents would respond, "Mr. Ramon!" also in unison. In the episode called "Get Ready, Set, Dough", Carlos has the responsibility of making chocolate cake for Ms. Frizzle's birthday. In "Getting Energized", he entertains a crowd and can even do impressions of Arnold Schwarzenegger. In one of the producer segments, one of the kids points out that Carlos's bad puns must come from the producers as heard in one of the phone calls.

=== Dorothy Ann Hudson ===
Dorothy Ann Hudson (voiced by Tara Meyer in the original series and Gabby Clarke in The Magic School Bus Rides Again) is the class reader and bookworm, always looking for a fact in one of her many books and is considered the brain of the class. She is usually called "D.A." by the others. She always carries her pink satchel, which holds her books. In the episode "Blows Its Top", Dorothy Ann loses her books, but realizes she does not need them to learn about things. She appears to love astronomy, especially in "Out of This World" and "Sees Stars", where she is seen to have a telescope. In "Sees Stars", Dorothy Ann is celebrating her birthday, but she is sick and stays home that day, making her the second and last student after Ralphie to be sick in an episode. She appears to enjoy physics too, as she is seen with a physics book in "Plays Ball". In the beginning of "Out of this World", she has a terrible nightmare about an asteroid crashing into her school and in the climax, she is the captain of the ship and she has her own ideas to save our planet. Dorothy Ann's last name is never mentioned in the books or the original TV show; however, her last name is mentioned to be "Hudson" in the sequel series, The Magic School Bus Rides Again. Its also revealed that she has a younger sister, named Evan. She is one of three kids known to have siblings, the other two being Carlos and Wanda. When reading about different facts, D.A. usually begins by saying, "According to my research the" In the original series, she had a slight British accent and pronounced "research" with the accent on the second syllable. In The Magic School Bus Rides Again, she pronounces it with the accent on the first syllable, as it is usually pronounced in the United States. In The Magic School Bus Rides Again, her book satchel is replaced by a purple tablet computer.

=== Jyoti Kaur ===
Jyoti Kaur (voiced by Birva Pandya) is an Indian-American girl who enrolls at Walker Elementary during the events of The Magic School Bus Rides Again. An expert on technology, she can create 3D holograms of herself, and she has even built a sentient robot named Naniben. Similar to Wanda, she opts to go where no one has ever gone before, and she is skilled in martial arts. For her catchphrase, she describes her feelings using gerunds.

=== Keesha Franklin ===
Keesha Franklin (voiced by Erica Luttrell in the original series and Mikaela Blake in The Magic School Bus Rides Again) is an African-American girl, who is considered to be the most level-headed and realistic student in the class. She is usually the most sarcastic one as well. Because of her skepticism, she often argues a lot with Ralphie, who tends to live in his imagination more than in real life. She is the only person to participate in every single field trip. When a situation went poorly, Keesha would often say, "Oh bad. Oh bad. Oh bad, bad, bad!" Her other catchphrase is, "Let's get the facts!" Keesha takes dance lessons.

=== Phoebe Terese ===
Phoebe Terese (voiced by Maia Filar) is a transfer student in Ms. Frizzle's class. She often compares Ms. Frizzle's class to how her 'old school' was with the phrase, "at my old school we never..." followed by a comparison to what was happening at the moment. Phoebe is portrayed as empathetic, sweet, gentle and kind. She is also shy, as she experiences stage fright in the episode "Gets Planted" where she becomes apprehensive about her role as a beanstalk in a Jack and the Beanstalk stage production after being turned into a bean plant by Ms. Frizzle (and later in the episode acts as the beanstalk). Phoebe is an animal activist, as seen in the episode "All Dried Up," "Gets Cold Feet," "Spins a Web," "Goes Upstream," "Ups and Downs," and "Getting Energized." Her great love of animals extends beyond vertebrates and also encompasses arthropods ("Butterfly and Bog Beast," "Spins a Web"). In certain episodes, she is a deficient gardener (as she initially does not grow a flower for the Walkerville Elementary school garden in "Goes to Seed" and does not have a large enough bean plant for the aforementioned production in "Gets Planted" before being turned into one). Phoebe is also the only student in Ms. Frizzle's class to host a producer scene at the end of the episode, as is the case in "All Dried Up." Her father is blind as seen in "Going Batty," and like her, he makes references to her old school. Phoebe's mother is never seen or mentioned in the show. In the original books, her parents are rarely mentioned or seen (though he does appear in some later literature), and it is implied she is raised by her grandparents (The Magic School Bus in the Time of the Dinosaurs and The Magic School Bus and the Electric Field Trip). She does not appear in The Magic School Bus Rides Again, and it is revealed by the character Arnold that she transferred back to her old school in the first episode of the show, "Frizzle of the Future."

=== Ralphie Tennelli ===
Ralph Alessandro Giuseppe "Ralphie" Tennelli (voiced by Stuart Stone in the original series, Matthew Mintz and Matthew Mucci in The Magic School Bus Rides Again) is the Italian-American class athlete. While in class, he likes to daydream. Ralphie is quite dark and mysterious, often staring off into the distance. His classmates often have to bring him back down to Earth. He plays lots of sports, including soccer, basketball, hockey, and baseball. He has a distaste for anchovies, which, as he tells the class in "Gets Eaten," his dad puts on pizza to keep him from eating it. Ralphie likes to serve as the leader of the students, despite having tendencies to jump to conclusions (as seen in "Goes Batty") and ignore better judgment (as seen in "In the City"). He also occasionally rivals Carlos when it comes to jokes. His catchphrases are "Is it just me, or..." and "I think I'm gonna be sick!" In the special "Kids in Space", Ralphie's full name is revealed to be Ralph Alessandro Giuseppe Tennelli.

=== Timothy "Tim" Wright ===
Timothy Jamal "Tim" Wright (voiced by Max Beckford in Season 1, Andre Ottley-Lorent in Seasons 2-4 in the original series and Kaden Stephen in The Magic School Bus Rides Again) is African-American, and is the most observant and artistic student. He can usually be found documenting what the class is doing, either by drawing or filming them, such as Liz posing on a crater on Mercury, his Ralphie-inspired comic book The Adventures of Weatherman, and getting footage of the swamp for evidence to argue Carlos' case. Tim wears many cardigans and has a soft-spoken voice. He is generally regarded as the most good-hearted and sweet by his class and Ms. Frizzle. His grandfather owns a honey bee farm outside of Walkerville, and as a small job, Tim delivers the honey at the start of winter. Like Dorothy Ann, his last name is never mentioned in the books or the original TV show; however, his last name is mentioned to be "Wright" in the sequel series, The Magic School Bus Rides Again. He is known to say "We've been Frizzled!" In The Magic School Bus Rides Again, he speaks with a Jamaican accent.

=== Wanda Li ===
Wanda Li (voiced by Lisa Yamanka in the original series and Lyney Pham in The Magic School Bus Rides Again) is a tough and boisterous Chinese-American tomboyish student, and is the smallest member of the class. Always willing to jump into adventure and going where "no kid has gone before," she serves as a foil to Arnold. She wants to solve all problems that face her. She can pull the metal handles off of large doors, using her powerful super strength; and even she can jump the highest into the air. Despite her tough exterior, she loves ballet, especially The Nutcracker, and appears to be a self-taught ballet dancer herself to a certain extent ("Holiday Special"). Wanda's favorite singer is Molly Cule (a play on the word molecule), and she loves sports, fighting, rock music (rather she's playing her electric guitar) and hanging out with boys. Despite coming across as very brash and bossy, she truly does care about her friends a lot, such as in "Holiday Special," where she is disappointed that Arnold could not come along to see The Nutcracker due to his grandmother being ill. In the original series spin-off books Ms. Frizzle's Adventures, she has an older brother named Henry, whereas on the TV series, she only has a younger brother, William. When the class is in a problematic situation, Wanda usually cries out, "What are we gonna do? What are we gonna do? What are we gonna do?!" Her other catchphrase is "Come on, you weaselly wimps!"

== The Magic School Bus ==
The bus is "very unusual" and sometimes seems to have a mind of its own. In appearance, it may look like a typical yellow school bus, but it is capable of shrinking and expanding, as well as transforming itself into many different kinds of items, most commonly as robotic animals in order to blend in with the environment in safari-type field trips. When it shrinks, so do its passengers, and occasionally, when the bus returns to its normal size when something was left behind, the other item is set back to normal too ("Gets Eaten").

It is usually completely under Ms. Frizzle's or Liz's control, although in certain episodes the bus exhibits independent, even irrational, behavior: in "Gets Ready, Set, Dough," the bus malfunctions and shrinks in size despite Ms. Frizzle trying to fix it. In "The Magic School Bus Holiday Special", the bus disassembles itself into raw materials (while scowling), after having done so to several other structures (though Wanda did angrily slam her fists in the bus's hood before it self-disassembled); and in "The Magic School Bus In The City", the bus, after becoming a bear, wanders off from the class into the city looking for food.

Its abilities are due to unspecified, magical additions, the origins of which are never fully explained, although it would appear that the new components are subtle enough to avoid attracting much attention from outsiders as the bus is often seen undergoing inspection without anyone commenting on its additions. The bus is capable of transforming into multiple different objects, ranging from a speck of pollen to a time machine to a small planet, though its trademark form is that of a rocket. Some of the bus's technologies also have specific names. For example, the device that allows the bus to shapeshift is called the "Mesmerglober", and the device that allows it to change size is called the "Shrinkerscope", (a portable version is called the Porta-shrinker); the Dew-Dinger is the device used to indicate whether the Shrinkerscope is wet, in which case it won't work. Another device is called the "Apidemonflemonjab", which is what caused the bus to malfunction in "Gets Ready, Set, Dough." Its exact function is never specified.

In some transformations, the bus itself comes in different colors, such as it turning green when it turned into an alligator, though it typically retains its major features such as its passenger compartment and windows, square headlight fixtures, and chrome grille and hood spine. Some episodes have featured the class having to deal with problems in the bus itself, such as a field trip to a bakery being jeopardized when the bus shrank unexpectedly.

== Relatives ==
=== Frizzle family ===
Dottie Frizzle is Valerie's niece who appears in a 1997 book.

Murph is Valerie's southern-accented cousin. Her full name is Katrina Eloise Murphy and she is specifically a first cousin who owns and operates Murph's Recycling Plant. She teaches the class the value of recycling in the 1996 episode "Holiday Special". She often warns everyone to be careful when using the word "junk." She is voiced by Dolly Parton.

=== Janet Perlstein ===
Janet Perlstein (voiced by Renessa Blitz in the original series and Annelie Forbes in The Magic School Bus Rides Again) is Arnold's know-it-all, bossy, rude, unfriendly and conceited cousin. She is very cruel to others and actively seeks to only make their lives worse, only ever acting in her own interests. She is very unpopular among the class, though she did manage to manipulate them into siding with her (and turning on Phoebe) when it came to naming the school mascot ("Butterfly and the Bog Beast"). Janet is so self-seeking that she usually tries to digress the class in some way to gain something for herself. She at first didn't believe Arnold's stories about his field trips until she went with the class and realized that the stories were real. She initially appeared in the book The Magic School Bus Lost in the Solar System, where it was stated she went to another school, but on the TV series, she attends a different class instead of a different school. Janet seems to be an only child, as Arnold mentions that she is his only cousin in "Butterfly and the Bog Beast."

She appeared in eleven episodes:

- "Gets Lost In Space"
- "Butterfly and the Bog Beast"
- "Gets a Bright Idea"
- "Goes Upstream"
- "Works Out"
- "Gets Swamped"
- "Sees Stars"
- "Makes a Stink"
- "Pigs in the Wind"
- "Ralphie Strikes a Nerve"
- "Janet's Mystery Gene"

=== The Hudson family ===
Mrs. Hudson
She appears in three episodes ("Going Batty," "Out of this World," and "Rocks and Rolls"). She also wears a ponytail compared to her daughter's pigtails. Voiced by Swoosie Kurtz.
Mr. Hudson
Makes speaking appearances in "Going Batty" and "Rocks and Rolls."
Evan Hudson
Dorothy Ann's little sister who appears in "Out of This World."

=== The Li family ===
Mrs. Li
Wanda's mother who first appears in "Going Batty", albeit to be in a speaking role. She has larger roles in "Ups and Downs" and "Under Construction", the latter of which she reveals that she is a science writer. She is also known to keep various reptiles around the house (such as an alligator in the bathtub and a Gila monster in the sandbox, according to Wanda). She is voiced by Rosalind Chao in the original series and Lisa Yamanaka in Rides Again.
William Li
Wanda's baby brother. He appears in "Ups and Downs" and "Under Construction", and makes a brief appearance in "The Magnetic Mambo". He is voiced by Lisa Yamanaka in both the original series and Rides Again.
Henry Li
Wanda's big brother. Appears in Ms. Frizzle's Adventures: Imperial China and implied to appear in the animated series in Meet the Class. Noted for his Ms. Frizzle-like hair.
Others
In Ms. Frizzle's Adventures: Imperial China, Wanda's grandmother and Mr. Li, Wanda's father, also appear.

=== The Ramón family ===
Mr. Ramón
Like his son, he also likes to make jokes, which the other parents (much like their kids) don't appear to enjoy. He appears in "Going Batty." Mrs. Ramon isn't mentioned in the show. He is voiced by Edward James Olmos.
Mikey Ramón
Carlos' younger, paraplegic brother who is a mechanical and computer whiz. Presumably not much younger than Carlos, the brothers seem close. Carlos calls him when the class needs help with something mechanical. He appears in "Getting Energized" and "Gets Programmed." He is voiced by Kevin Zegers in the original series and an unidentified voice actor in Rides Again.
John
Only seen in the first books of the magic school bus series. He looks uncannily similar to Carlos, making him a possible brother.

=== The Wright family ===
Tim's father and mother
They appeared in "Going Batty", but did not speak (outside of joining the other parents in scolding Carlos' father).

Tim's grandfather
He owns an apiary outside of Walkerville.

=== The Franklins, Tennellis, Tereses, Perlsteins, and Kaurs ===
Mrs. Lita Franklin
Keesha's grandmother who appeared in "Going Batty," when Walkerville Elementary had its annual parent-teacher conference during the night. Keesha's parents are never seen or mentioned, so it is possible that Keesha's grandmother is her guardian. She is voiced by Eartha Kitt.

Dr. Alice Tennelli
Ralphie's mother, who is a physician. In "Inside Ralphie," when Ralphie was ill and made a joke, she responded, "Even your jokes are sick." She also appears in "Going Batty" going on a field trip with Ms. Frizzle. She also has a brief appearance in the episode "Rocks and Rolls." Voiced by Tyne Daly. Ralphie's father is referenced in "Gets Eaten" when Ralphie mentions he likes anchovies on his pizza. It is also briefly mentioned in "Inside Ralphie" that he has a grandfather, though he is never seen.

Mr. Judy Terese
Phoebe's father who is blind and, like Phoebe, makes references about her old school. He appears in "Going Batty" and has a brief appearance in the episode "Rocks and Rolls." Mr. Terese doesn't mention his wife. Voiced by Dana Elcar.

Mr. Brad & Mrs. Angie Perlstein
Arnold's parents who appeared in "Going Batty," "Rocks And Rolls," and "Goes Cellular." Like their son, they seem to really dislike field trips, hence Mr. Perlstein's line, "Maybe we should have stayed home tonight." Mr. Perlstein is voiced by Elliott Gould.

Pariksha
Jyoti's grandmother or "naanii" who lives in England, is also a computer expert, and a friend of Fiona Frizzle's.

== Others ==
Professor Cornelia C. Contralto II
The curator and owner of the town's sound museum. She, like her great-grandmother Professor Cornelia C. Contralto I, is an expert in acoustics and vibration. The professor also helped Carlos develop and better his instrument, and find the perfect sound. Professor Contralto II is always looking to add to her great-grandmother's sound collection. At the end of episode 8, "In The Haunted House", Carlos gave her permission to add his instrument's sound to the collection in gratitude for her helping him. She is voiced by Carol Channing.

General Araneus
The main antagonist of "Spins a Web." A semi-retired general who plots to capture the giant Mantis in Stand By Your Mantis, an old horror movie that Ms. Frizzle's class magically enters. He attempts to use Liz as a bait for his Mantis trap but the class manages to stop him. He is voiced by Ed Asner.

Molly Cule
She's a famous rock singer and one of the original Frizzlettes (Ms. Frizzle's old band she used to tour with). The class got to wash her car in the episode "Meets Molly Cule." Wanda's also a huge fan of hers. She is voiced by Wynonna Judd.

Dr. Carmina "Bonesy" Skeledon
A paleontologist who the class visits at a fossil dig up in "The Busasaurus". She is voiced by Rita Moreno.

Mr. Junkett
Junkett is an African-American Vehicle Maintenance Inspector from the episode "Revving Up." As a minor antagonist, he accidentally leaves a peanut butter sandwich on the bus's carburetor (blocking air inflow), which then drips peanut butter into the bus's fuel line and cylinder's spark plug, which makes the bus break down. He is voiced by Sherman Hemsley.

Mr. McClean
Voiced by Malcolm McDowell. The school janitor, who struggles to control the new automatic welcome system in "Gets Programmed".

Rainforest Inspector 22 (formerly 47)
He appears in "In The Rainforest", and inadvertently upset the ecological balance of the rainforest when he covered a mud wallow with artificial turf; upon correcting the problem, he was promoted to Inspector 22. There are also other rainforest inspectors, such as 1 and 46. He is voiced by Matt Frewer.

Radius Ulna "R.U." Humerus
Ms. Frizzle's mechanic who appeared in "Flexes Its Muscles" and provided the M.I.K.E. to help the kids build RalphieBot. He is named for the three major bones in the human arm. He insists on being called "R.U." He is voiced by Tony Randall.

Mr. Garth Sinew
A strong, bodybuilding PE teacher at Walkerville Elementary who is Ms. Frizzle's toughest competition in a triathlon event. He is voiced by Miami Dolphins quarterback Dan Marino.

Gerri Poveri
The main antagonist of "Ups and Downs." She is the host of the reality show In Your Face and has claimed to have taken a real picture of a lake monster. She tries to keep Ms. Frizzle and her class from finding the monster at the bottom of the lake because it was a fake. But eventually, her plan doesn't come to fruition, and she is exposed, which makes her show even more popular. She is voiced by Cindy Williams.

The Baker
The baker who runs the bakery where the class secretly made the special cake for Ms. Frizzle's birthday party in "Gets Ready, Set, Dough!" When the bus shrank and snuck into the bakery, he mistook it for a moth. He also appears in the opening title sequence where the bus flies out of a cake. He is voiced by Dom DeLuise.

Larry
A logger who runs a dial-up sanitation service. In "Meets the Rot Squad", when Wanda found a rotting log in an empty lot, at first she hated it and called up Larry to remove it. But later she and the class found out that the log had life in it, and helped make soil by decomposing. Then when Larry suddenly arrived, Wanda convinced him not to destroy it in disguise as a "Log gremlin". He is voiced by Ed Begley Jr.

Mr. Ruhle
The principal of Walkerville Elementary. In "Makes a Rainbow", he once ran a bet with Ms. Frizzle on whether or not she could beat the light pinball machine she and Liz had built. In "Gets Programmed", he is initially confused when the morning duties are happening on their own. He begins to confront the class for programming his new computer since he had only asked them to set it up. He then firmly asks the class if they expect him to be pleased for taking the extra steps, because he's not. Then at the last second, he smiles and says he's thrilled. He is an expert on chickens, owning a Rhode Island Red rooster named Giblets, whom Dorothy Ann had accidentally lost in "Cracks a Yolk". He is voiced by Paul Winfield. In Rides Again, he is revealed to be an expert on the Sun. In Rides Again, he is voiced by Martin Roach.

Archibald Seedplot
Phoebe's teacher at her old school who appears in "Goes To Seed." His passion seems to be gardening. It is learned in this episode that he knew Ms. Frizzle (and considers himself her "biggest fan"). He is voiced by Robby Benson.

Production Supervisors (aka The Magic School Bus Producers)
In the fictional call-in segment at the end of the show, various characters answer questions asked by "viewers". One of the producers usually answers these calls, sometimes two producers appear at the same time, and almost always with Liz. One of the producers is an African-American male voiced by Malcolm-Jamal Warner. Another producer is an Asian female voiced by Susan Blu. Other characters have appeared in the producer segments, including characters from the episode, as well as a ghost that appears only in "In the Haunted House" (Voiced by Catherine Thompson). This segment is based on the comedic disclaimer pages at the end of the books. In The Magic School Bus Rides Again, the producers are replaced by Professor Frizzle, who takes calls while conducting her research or going on adventures.
