= Terese =

Terese is the name of the following people:

- Phoebe Terese, one of Ms. Frizzle’s classmates in the Scholastic book and television series The Magic School Bus
- Terese Berceau (born 1950), member of the Wisconsin State Assembly
- Terese Capucilli, American modern dancer
- Therese Forster (1786–1862), German educator and writer
- Teresė Nekrošaitė (born 1961), Lithuanian javelin thrower
- Terese Nielsen (born 1966), American fantasy artist
- Terese Pedersen (born 1980), Norwegian handball goalkeeper
- Terese Svoboda, American author

== See also ==
- Teresa
