= The Magic School Bus (book series) =

Children's educational book series

- Author: Joanna Cole
- Illustrator: Bruce Degen
- Discipline: Children's literature
- Publisher: Scholastic Corporation
- Website: Facebook

The Magic School Bus is a series of children's books about science, written by Joanna Cole and illustrated by Bruce Degen. Designed for ages 6-9, they feature the antics of Ms. Valerie Felicity Frizzle and her class, who board a sentient anthropomorphic mini school bus which takes them on field trips to impossible locations, including the Solar System, clouds, the past, and the human body. The books are written in the first person from the point of view of an unspecified student in "the Friz's" class. The class has a pet lizard named Liz, who accompanies the class on their field trips.

Since the Magic School Bus books present scientific facts in the form of stories in which fantastic things happen (for example, the bus turns into a spaceship, or children shrink to the size of blood cells), each book has a page at the end detailing in a humorous manner which parts of the book represented scientific fact and which were fanciful storytelling.

== History ==
Craig Walker, vice-president and senior editorial director at Scholastic Co., stated that the concept began with the idea of combining science with fictional stories, and Joanna Cole (who had written both science and humor before) and Bruce Degen were then approached with creating such a series. Walker also states that his own memories of school field trips and of a teacher he had once, served as further inspiration.

The first book "At the Waterworks" was written in 1985 and published the following year.

Cole and Degen started a new series called Ms. Frizzle's Adventures in 2001, which teaches social studies. In those books, Ms. Frizzle travels through time via a special watch. There are now three books in that series. Microsoft Home started publishing Magic School Bus software in 1994. TW Kids published four audio cassettes/activity book "Fun-Kits" in 1994 and 1995, these audio cassettes use audio from the TV Series. Scholastic has also published the original series books as read-along book-on-tapes and book-on-CDs.

Scholastic Entertainment, the American Meteorological Society and the Children's Museum of Houston created a Scholastics the Magic School Bus Kicks Up a Storm, a 2,600 sq ft (240 m^{2}) traveling exhibit funded in part by the National Science Foundation, which premiered at the Children's Museum of Houston in 2003 (a copy of it opened in New Jersey the month after that).

== Characters ==
In the original series books, Ms. Frizzle's class had a larger number of multiethnic students and consisted of Alex, Amanda Jane, Arnold, Carlos, Carmen, Dorothy Ann, Florrie, Gregory, John, Keesha, Michael, Molly, Phil, Phoebe, Rachel, Ralph (changed to "Ralphie" on the show and subsequent books in this series), Shirley, Tim and Wanda (19 students). Phoebe was first introduced in the 1987 book, The Magic School Bus Inside the Earth. Carlos and Keesha were added in the 1994 book, The Magic School Bus In the Time of Dinosaurs.

In the other books and merchandise --including the TV series and TV tie-in books-- Ms. Frizzle's class was whittled down to eight kids (Arnold, Carlos, Dorothy Ann, Keesha, Phoebe, Ralphie, Tim and Wanda; Jyoti is an original character who replaces Phoebe in The Magic School Bus Rides Again).

== List of books and merchandise ==
=== Original series books ===
1. The Magic School Bus at the Waterworks (1986)
2. The Magic School Bus Inside the Earth (1987)
3. The Magic School Bus Inside the Human Body (1989)
4. The Magic School Bus Lost in the Solar System (1990)
5. The Magic School Bus On the Ocean Floor (1992)
6. The Magic School Bus In the Time of the Dinosaurs (1994)
7. The Magic School Bus Inside a Hurricane (1995)
8. The Magic School Bus Inside a Beehive (1996)
9. The Magic School Bus and the Electric Field Trip (1997)
10. The Magic School Bus Explores the Senses (1999)
11. The Magic School Bus and the Science Fair Expedition (2006) (released as part of a 20th anniversary celebration of the series as a whole)
12. The Magic School Bus and the Climate Challenge (2010)
13. The Magic School Bus Explores Human Evolution (2020)

=== Chapter books ===
1. The Truth about Bats (1999) by Eva Moore
2. The Search for the Missing Bones (1999) by Eva Moore
3. The Wild Whale Watch (2000) by Eva Moore
4. Space Explorers (2000) by Eva Moore
5. Twister Trouble (2000) by Ann Schreiber
6. The Giant Germ (2000) by Anne Capeci
7. The Great Shark Escape (2000) by Jennifer Johnston
8. Penguin Puzzle (2001) by Judith Bauer Stamper
9. Dinosaur Detectives (2001) by Judith Bauer Stamper
10. Expedition Down Under (2001) by Rebecca Carmi
11. Insect Invaders (2001) by Anne Capeci
12. Amazing Magnetism (2001) by Rebecca Carmi
13. Polar Bear Patrol (2002) by Judith Bauer Stamper
14. Electric Storm (2002) by Anne Capeci
15. Voyage to the Volcano (2003) by Judith Bauer Stamper
16. Butterfly Battle (2003) by Nancy White
17. Food Chain Frenzy (2003) by Anne Capeci
18. The Fishy Field Trip (2004) by Martin Schwabacher
19. Color Day Relay (2004) by Gail Herman
20. Rocky Road Trip (2004) by Judith Bauer Stamper

=== Scholastic Reader Level 2 ===
1. The Magic School Bus Has A Heart
2. The Magic School Bus Gets Caught In a Web
3. The Magic School Bus Gets Recycled
4. The Magic School Bus And the Missing Tooth
5. The Magic School Bus Fights Germs
6. The Magic School Bus Gets Crabby
7. The Magic School Bus Explores the World of Bugs
8. The Magic School Bus Weathers the Storm
9. The Magic School Bus At the First Thanksgiving
10. The Magic School Bus Arctic Adventure
11. The Magic School Bus Lost in Snow
12. The Magic School Bus and the Shark Adventure
13. The Magic School Bus Builds the Statue of Liberty
14. The Magic School Bus in a Bat Cave
15. The Magic School Bus Comes to Its Senses
16. The Magic School Bus and the Wild Leaf Ride
17. The Magic School Bus and the Butterfly Bunch
18. The Magic School Bus Inside a Volcano
19. The Magic School Bus Rides the Wind
20. The Magic School Bus in the Rain Forest
21. The Magic School Bus Sleeps for the Winter
22. The Magic School Bus Explores the World of Animals
23. The Magic School Bus to the Rescue: Blizzard
24. The Magic School Bus to the Rescue: Forest Fire
25. The Magic School Bus to the Rescue: Earthquake
26. The Magic School Bus to the Rescue: Flash Flood
27. The Magic School Bus Inside Your Mouth
28. The Magic School Bus Explores the Ocean
29. The Magic School Bus Flies with Dinosaurs
30. The Magic School Bus Takes a Moonwalk
31. The Magic School Bus Flies From the Nest
32. The Magic School Bus Blasts Into Space
33. The Magic School Bus Gets Cleaned Up

=== TV tie-in books ===
1. The Magic School Bus Gets Ants in its Pants
2. The Magic School Bus Going Batty
3. The Magic School Bus in the Haunted Museum
4. The Magic School Bus Gets all Dried Up
5. The Magic School Bus In the Arctic
6. The Magic School Bus Meets the Rot Squad
7. The Magic School Bus Blows Its Top
8. The Magic School Bus Answers Questions
9. The Magic School Bus Inside Ralphie
10. The Magic School Bus Gets Programmed
11. The Magic School Bus Kicks Up a Storm
12. The Magic School Bus Plays Ball
13. The Magic School Bus Plants Seeds
14. The Magic School Bus Ups and Downs
15. The Magic School Bus Gets a Bright Idea
16. The Magic School Bus Butterfly and the Bog Beast
17. The Magic School Bus Makes a Rainbow
18. The Magic School Bus Gets Baked in a Cake
19. The Magic School Bus Out of this World
20. The Magic School Bus Taking Flight
21. The Magic School Bus Takes a Dive
22. The Magic School Bus Gets Cold Feet
23. The Magic School Bus Shows and Tells
24. The Magic School Bus Spins a Web
25. The Magic School Bus Gets Planted
26. The Magic School Bus Gets Eaten
27. The Magic School Bus Wet All Over
28. The Magic School Bus Goes Upstream
29. The Magic School Bus In A Pickle
30. The Magic School Bus Hops Home
31. The Magic School Bus Sees Stars
32. The Magic School Bus Looking for Liz (sticker book)

=== TV tie-in fun kits ===
1. The Magic School Bus: Fun With Sound
2. The Magic School Bus: Habitat
3. The Magic School Bus: Kicks Up A Storm
4. The Magic School Bus: Goes to Seed

=== A Science Fact Finder Book ===
1. Skeletons Fact Finder
2. Bats Fact Finder
3. Field Trip Facts

=== Ms. Frizzle's Adventures ===
1. Imperial China
2. Medieval Castle
3. Ancient Egypt

=== Liz series ===
1. Liz Finds a Friend
2. Liz Takes Flight
3. Liz Looks for a Home
4. Liz Sorts It Out
5. Liz on the Move
6. Liz Makes a Rainbow

=== Magic School Bus Presents: A Nonfiction Companion to the Original Magic School Bus Series ===
1. Our Solar System
2. The Human Body
3. Sea Creatures
4. The Rain Forest
5. Wild Weather
6. Dinosaurs
7. Planet Earth
8. Insects
9. Volcanoes & Earthquakes
10. Polar Animals

=== DVDs ===
1. AND THE ENVIRONMENT - Rocks and Rolls & Holiday Special
2. AND THE FLYING ANIMALS - Going Batty & Butterfly and the Bog Beast
3. BIG AND SMALL - BATMAN The Busasaurus & Gets Ants in its Pants
4. EXPLORES CELLS AND MOLECULES - Meets Molly Cule & Goes Cellular
5. EXPLORES INSECTS - Beehive & Spins A Web
6. EXPLORES NEW HABITATS - In The City & Get Swamped
7. EXPLORES THE HUMAN BODY - Works Out & Makes A Stink
8. FOOD - Meets the Rot Squad & Gets Ready, Set, Dough
9. FOOD CYCLE - Gets Eaten & Goes to Seed
10. GETS A BOOST - Getting Energized & Revving Up
11. GETS ROCKING - Out of this World & Blows its Top
12. GETS TO SHINE — Gets a Bright Idea & Makes a Rainbow
13. GOES ON A FIELD TRIP - In The Arctic & Goes Upstream
14. HABITATS AND DESERTS - Hops Home & All Dried Up
15. THE HUMAN BODY - Inside Ralphie & For Lunch
16. IN MOTION - Taking Flight & Flexes Its Muscles
17. IN THE AIR - Kicks Up a Storm & Gets Lost in Space
18. IN THE WATER - Ups and Downs & Wet All Over
19. LEARNS ABOUT MICROBES AND REPTILES - In A Pickle & Cold Feet
20. LEARNS ABOUT PLANTS AND FORESTS - Gets Planted & In The Rain Forest
21. LEARNS SOMETHING NEW - Cracks a Yolk & Gets Programmed
22. LEARNS TO BUILD - Under Construction & Shows and Tells
23. LIGHTS UP - Sees Stars & Gets Charged
24. PHYSICS - Plays Ball & In the Haunted House
25. TESTS THE WATERS - Goes to Mussel Beach & Takes a Dive
26. UNDER PRESSURE - Goes on Air & Gains Weight
27. SUPER STAR POWER - Gets Planted, Goes Cellular, Sees Stars & Taking Flight
28. TAKES A DRIVE - Goes to Mussel Beach, Gets Swamped, Takes a Dive & For Lunch
29. TAKES FLIGHT - Kicks Up a Storm, Taking Flight, Hops Home & Gets Swamped
30. HUMAN BODY - For Lunch, Inside Ralphie, Flexes Its Muscles & Gets Planted
31. BLAST OFF FROM SPACE TO SEA - Wet All Over, Ups and Downs, Rocks and Rolls, Gets Eaten, Meets the Rot Squad, Gets Ready, Set, Dough, Gets Lost in Space, Out of This World, Gains Weight, Goes Upstream, Butterfly and the Bog Beast & Plays Ball
32. FIELD TRIP FUN & GAMES - The Busasaurus, Cold Feet, Goes Upstream, Plays Ball, Shows & Tells, Works Out, Gets Ants in Its Pants, Butterfly and the Bog Beast, In a Beehive, Gets Eaten, Rocks and Rolls, Gains Weight
33. THE COMPLETE SERIES - All 52 episodes from the 4 season run

=== VHS ===
1. Flexes Its Muscles
2. Gets Lost In Space
3. Gets Charged
4. All Dried Up
5. Hops Home
6. Inside The Haunted House
7. Inside Ralphie
8. Gets Eaten
9. For Lunch
10. Blows Its Top
11. Plays Ball
12. Goes To Seed
13. Kicks Up A Storm
14. Going Batty
15. Creepy Crawly Fun
16. Greatest Adventures
17. Under Construction
18. Out Of This World
19. Gets Ants In Its Pants
20. Gets Planted
21. Butterflies!
22. Ready, Set, Dough
23. The Busasaurus
24. In The Rainforest
25. Makes A Rainbow
26. Taking Flight
27. Getting Energized
28. Magic School Bus Holiday Special
29. Spins A Web
30. In A Beehive

== Individual books ==
The original Magic School Bus books are:

- The Magic School Bus at the Waterworks (ISBN 0-590-40360-5, 1986)
  - Theme: the water cycle and the waterworks
  - Ms Frizzle's class is going with her on the most boring field trip, to the waterworks. At least that is what they think until they discover how interesting things always happen on Ms Frizzle's trips. After going through a tunnel, all the children find themselves in scuba diving outfits. On the top of a bridge the bus rises up in the air and into a cloud. Once in the cloud, the class finds that water droplets are growing, and they are shrinking. The class rains and lands in the water purification system. Eventually it takes them back to Walkerville Elementary, where they come out of the faucet in the girls' bathroom. Later, they see the bus outside and wonder how it returned from the cloud.
- The Magic School Bus Inside the Earth (ISBN 0-590-40760-0, 1987)
  - Theme: geology
  - Ms Frizzle's class is starting a unit on geology and for homework every student has to find a rock, and bring it to school. The next day every child except Phil has an excuse, so Ms Frizzle decides to take the class on a field trip to collect rocks. The class starts digging until they, with the help of the magic bus, dig all the way through the center of Earth. They collect many rocks and learn about the different types. Phoebe Terese first appears in this book as the "new kid". Before the show was even in production, the Magic School Bus appeared on PBS, because this book was featured on Reading Rainbow.
- The Magic School Bus Inside the Human Body (ISBN 0-590-41427-5, 1989)
  - Theme: the human body
  - Ms Frizzle's class is going to the museum to see an exhibit on the human body. However they stop for lunch at a park and Arnold Perlstein takes too long to eat. When Ms Frizzle tries to hit the horn to tell him to hurry, she "accidentally" pushes a strange little button on the dashboard and the class finds itself inside a human body, but they are unaware that it is Arnold's. They go through the digestive system and brain and out through the nose.
- The Magic School Bus Lost in the Solar System (ISBN 0-590-41429-1, 1990)
  - Theme: the Solar System
  - Arnold's know-it-all cousin Janet, is coming on the field trip this time. They are going to the planetarium to see a show about the Solar System, but it is closed for repairs. On the way back to school, they blast off and fly into outer space. They visit all the planets and learn about them, but in the asteroid belt, they lose Ms Frizzle and find themselves lost in space. The rocket bus featured in this book has become a symbol of the Magic School Bus series.
- The Magic School Bus On the Ocean Floor (ISBN 0-590-41431-3, 1992)
  - Theme: the ocean
  - Ms Frizzle's class is learning about the ocean. It is really hot and the children just want a break. They are thrilled when she says they will take a trip to the ocean. When she gets to the beach she starts to drive into the water and they realise that when Ms Frizzle says "ocean" she means "ocean". Believing the bus is in trouble, Lenny the Lifeguard decides to try to save the children and instead finds himself accompanying them on the field trip.
- The Magic School Bus In the Time of the Dinosaurs (ISBN 0-590-44689-4, 1994)
  - Theme: dinosaurs
  - The children are turning their classroom into Dinosaur Land for Parents' Night, as they are studying dinosaurs. Ms. Frizzle receives a letter from an old high school friend who is now a paleontologist and she decides to take the class on a trip to the dig. When she discovers that they are missing the bones of some Maiasaurs, she turns the bus into a time machine to travel back to the age of dinosaurs to find the bones. The class sees dinosaurs and learns the name of the different periods of the era and other information. This is the first time Ms Frizzle's first name is mentioned, and it is the first appearance of Carlos Ramon and Keesha Franklin, although Keesha was first seen in The Magic School Bus: On the Ocean Floor.
- The Magic School Bus Inside a Hurricane (ISBN 0-590-44687-8, 1995)
  - Theme: weather
  - The class is going to the weather station to learn about weather. However, on the way there the bus turns into a hot air balloon. Eventually they find themselves inside a hurricane. Ms Frizzle's radio proves an annoyance to Arnold in this book, as it seems to know his name.
- The Magic School Bus Inside a Beehive (1996)
  - Theme: bees
  - The class is now learning about insects and Ms Frizzle is taking her class on a trip to meet a beekeeper, but they beat the beekeeper there. While they are waiting, Ms Frizzle accidentally pushes a small lever which turns the bus into a tiny beehive and the class (including Ms Frizzle) into bees. They explore the hive and learn about bees, but can they save the hive from a bear?
- The Magic School Bus and the Electric Field Trip (1998)
  - Theme: electricity
  - The children in Ms Frizzle's class were sure that there was nobody like her, but that was before they met her niece, Dottie Frizzle. Dottie accompanies the class on their field trip to the town power plant. There the bus turns into a dump truck, and pours the children into the plant. They shrink and travel through the Walkerville electric system.
- The Magic School Bus Explores the Senses (1999)
  - Theme: the five senses
  - The class is learning about the senses and they are going to sing a song for an important teacher meeting. However, Ms Frizzle's personality and clothes make the class forget. Ms Frizzle thinks the meeting is tomorrow, but it is really today. So Mr. Wilde, the assistant principal, decides to catch her so he can tell her about the meeting. He decides to get in a bus that just happens to be the magic school bus. The class decides to accompany him. They cannot let him drive that bus, not all by himself. Mr. Wilde accidentally shrinks the bus and soon he and the class find themselves on a trip exploring the senses. Mr. Wilde soon becomes obsessed with driving the bus and forgets all about finding Ms Frizzle, but the class does not. Ms Frizzle's mother appears in this book.
- The Magic School Bus and the Science Fair Expedition (ISBN 0-590-10824-7; 2006)
  - Theme: famous scientists in history
  - The first MSB book since 1999, The Magic School Bus celebrated its 20th anniversary with this new book published on 1 August 2006. Ms. Frizzle and her class have to find projects to display at the Walkerville Science Fair, and fast. They decide to consult with famous scientists in history like Louis Pasteur, George Washington Carver, Charles Darwin, Marie Curie, Isaac Newton, Galileo Galilei, even Albert Einstein. All the original characters are in this book.
- The Magic School Bus and the Climate Challenge (ISBN 0-590-10826-3; 2010)
  - Theme: climate change
  - Ms. Frizzle takes the class on a flight on the bus over the arctic, showing them how the polar ice caps have melted since Ms. Frizzle's old copy of Our Wonderful World was published. They travel around the earth, observing the impacts of global warming and alternative energy sources. Returning to their home town, Ms. Frizzle gives the class special goggles to observe the greenhouse-gas molecules in the air. When the students return to school, they discuss things people can do to save energy and reduce carbon emissions.
