= The Magic School Bus (video game series) =

- Genre: Educational game
- Developers: Music Pen, Scholastic

The Magic School Bus is a series of educational video games developed by Music Pen and published by Microsoft via their Microsoft Home brand. The interactive adventures are part of the larger franchise and based with The Magic School Bus original series books and public television series (which originally aired on PBS).

== Development ==
Most of the original software games were created by the software company Music Pen Multimedia in collaboration with Microsoft and Scholastic Press, the publisher of the Magic School Bus book series. Scholastic, which created the "Magic School Bus" television series on PBS, licensed its content to Microsoft. To access the home market, Microsoft created a video game brand called Microsoft Home, and a software series was created under that umbrella. At the time, many companies lacked the expertise to develop multimedia projects, so they turned to smaller new media companies. The company hired the garage shop Music Pen to create a program, a company started 15 years prior by concert pianist Wu and composer Philip Lui who wrote programs that taught music comprehension. After the contract, Music Pen grew from 5 people to 40, and was based in New York. The games were based on the books and the PBS show.

By 1997, Microsoft Home was struggling due to a crowded market. In 1998, Scholastic's The Magic School Bus Adventure Series Volumes 1, 2 and 3 were announced.

The team received feedback from teachers and parents to inform their products. The series won the Software Publisher's Association Codie award for Best Elementary Educational titles and the National Parenting Center Seal of Approval. Most recently, Scholastic's The Magic School Bus CD-ROM series by Microsoft received the FamilyPC Family Tested Software Recommended Seal in the education category and was named Top Picks of 1997 by the Toy Testing Council.

Like the TV series, the bus was animated in the usual way, in the CD-ROM games, it is typically animated with computer-generated imagery (or "CGI"). Most of the games in the original software were based with books from the original series of books. In all these titles the user gets to "drive" the bus, which almost always involves clicking on the steering wheel and choosing a location. (The exception is The Magic School Bus Explores Inside the Earth—the software adaptation of the original series book The Magic School Bus Inside the Earth—where it is the gear shift instead of the steering wheel.) Most of the games also have seven different locations, including the classroom. There is some goal to find a specific number of missing collectibles for the user in almost every game (with the exception of The Magic School Bus Explores the Human Body—the software adaptation of the original series book The Magic School Bus Inside the Human Body). In the other games, there is a "missing collectible" minigame where the player has to find three or four missing collectibles. The video game series (both original titles and activity centers) are targeted for children ages 5–10.

The games include activities to assist the player's learning.

System requirements vary among the games. Games with the Macintosh indication can be used on a Macintosh LC 550 or newer with a minimum of System 7.1, 8 MB RAM, 8 MB hard disk space, color monitor, and 2X CD-ROM drive.

== Original Software ==
=== The Magic School Bus Explores the Solar System (1994) ===
This game is based on both the book The Magic School Bus Lost in the Solar System (from the classic series of books) and the episode The Magic School Bus Gets Lost in Space. The user flies the bus to their chosen planet and play experiments and clicks on things there. To win the game, the user has to discover the whereabouts of Ms. Frizzle. To do so, they have to play a "whatsit" game to earn a token (for a total of three clues) in order to find Ms. Frizzle, which gives them a clue as to which planet Ms. Frizzle is on. Once Ms. Frizzle is found, the bus will return to the classroom, and the game begins again. All nine planets and Earth's Moon can be visited. When the gas giants are visited, the bus lands on one of their moons.

The game was one of the chosen few "highly visual scholastic programs" in the Citrus Country library System's new youth CD-ROM station in 1997. The Spokesman-Review deemed it a "fact-and-fun filled ride."

=== The Magic School Bus Explores the Human Body (1994, Macintosh; 1995, Windows 95) ===
This game is based on the book The Magic School Bus Inside the Human Body and the episode The Magic School Bus for Lunch. Arnold has become the class's next field trip. The user can drive the bus to 12 different organs. In some locations, the player can leave the bus. Each place has an arcade game and a science experiment and a lot to explore. This is the first game that allows the user to sign in and go to the back of the bus. This is also one of the few games in which Liz can talk (voiced by Catherine Thompson). This is the only game to not have a "missing collectible" minigame (where the player must find a specific and fixed number of missing collectibles).

Both Quandary and All Game Guide gave the game 70/100. Superkids gave it 3.5/5 stars.

The Milwaukee Sentinel was bemused that the program got a kindergartner playtester interested in the small intestines. Bangor Daily News deemed it a "splendid mix of experiments, explanations, and games." The Daily Gazette deemed it "delightful." The Boston Globe tested the program on the latest Compaq Presario computer yet experienced game-breaking technical issues; the newspaper therefore commented that "Microsoft should be ashamed of itself." The Economist said the game was less informative than DK Multimedia titles.

=== The Magic School Bus Explores the Ocean (1995, Macintosh) ===
This game is based on The Magic School Bus on the Ocean Floor and the episode The Magic School Bus Gets Eaten (including its TV tie-in book adaptation). This is one of the two games which is based on any book from the TV tie-in books, with the other being The Magic School Bus Explores Inside the Earth. The class has taken a field trip to the beach; here they find a message in a bottle, which contains clues (three clues) to a treasure. The user explores the ocean and follows clues that lead him/her to the treasure. This was the first CD-ROM that featured the entire cast on the bus and is the only game where the classroom cannot be visited.

The game won an award for Home PC—Holiday Gift Guide - The Best Programs of 1996. The Cedartown Standard praised the game for combining fun with education.

=== The Magic School Bus Explores Inside the Earth (1996) ===
This game is based on the book The Magic School Bus Inside the Earth and the episode The Magic School Bus Blows Its Top (and its TV tie in book adaptation). Arnold has lost some of the rocks and minerals in his collection. He is missing four rocks. The user (who has to find four missing rocks) explores several places such as a canyon, a geode, a fault, a volcano, and an undersea environment; the undersea environment features a subduction zone, a mid-ocean ridge, and an underwater volcano. The user can collect rocks in various ways. The goal is to find replacements for the rocks and minerals Arnold lost.

Superkids gave the game a score of 4.3/5. Alamo PC Organization wrote that "the program is both educating and entertaining".

=== The Magic School Bus Explores in the Age of Dinosaurs (1996) ===
This game (in the original software series) is based on the book The Magic School Bus in the Time of the Dinosaurs and the episode The Busasaurus.

Ms. Frizzle's photo album is missing three snapshots of prehistoric animals (from a specific album: meat-eating dinosaurs, plant-eating dinosaurs, and prehistoric reptiles that aren't dinosaurs). The user travels back in time with her class to seven different dinosaur locations in order to search for live dinosaurs and help replace the photographs. When the player finds all three photographs, they are awarded a mask of a prehistoric animal (matching an animal from that specific album, either Tyrannosaurus rex, Brachiosaurus, or Pterodactylus).

If the player already has too many driver's license panels saved, they can save the game and, before leaving, select an old driver's license to replace or discard in order to make room for the new file. This feature is exclusive to this game. Additionally, this is the first of the four games with a CC (closed captioning) option that allows you to enable or disable subtitles.

Both All Game Guide and Quandary gave it 70/100. Metzomagic gave it 3.5/5 stars.

Microsoft donated copies of the game to high school students via the University of Maine Upward Bound Program.

=== The Magic School Bus Explores the Rainforest (1997) ===
The class is decorating their classroom for "Rainforest Day"."Wanda brought a "Right-Away-Rainforest Toolbox" that could do the job, but some "bio-clones" (four of them) are missing from the kit. Ms. Frizzle takes the class on a field trip to the Costa Rican rainforest to find the missing bio-clones. This game is one of the two games not to be based on any books from the classic series. (That is, with the other game of the two being Explores the World of Animals.) However, it is based wonthe TV series episode In the Rainforest. That is, but not with any books from the original series. This is the last game to be created by Music Pen.

All Game Guide gave it 80/100. Harfort Courant thought, "Even on a slower PC, the game was fun and interesting."

=== The Magic School Bus Explores Bugs (1999) ===
This is the first game in the software series to replace the original voice actors of the eight children from the TV series. This game is based on four adaptations inside a beehive (from the book series), plus four episodes from the TV series (that being Gets Ants in Its Pants, Butterfly and the Bog Beast, Spins a Web, and In a Beehive). In this game the children have designed biodomes for a contest, but each pair has lost one of the bugs from their projects. This is the final game in the original software series. Like in The Magic School Bus Explores the World of Animals, this game is not based on any adaptation. The player's task in this game is to find a specimen of each of the four missing bugs in one of four natural habitats. In each habitat, one of the children transforms into a bug; for example, Arnold turns into an ambush bug when he is in the meadow, Keesha changes into a luna moth when she is in the forest, Ralphie turns into a Hercules beetle when he is in the jungle, and Dorothy Ann changes into a mayfly nib when she is in the pond.

The game was given a score of 90/100 by Tech with Kids (Computing with Kids) and 50/100 by Macworld. SuperKids gave it 4.5/5.

Ludington Daily News praised the game for its high quality engaging multimedia and accurate information.

=== The Magic School Bus Explores the World of Animals (1999) ===
This game is based with two episodes from the TV series Hops Home (and its TV book adaptation) and In the City. But like Explores the Rainforest, it is not baseonth any books from the book series. In this game, the user has to find all four animals (which are placed into their wrong habitats) and send them back to their own (and correct) habitats where they each belong. If the game is played at another time, the player has two options (to "Continue saved game" or "Collect 4 missing collectibles"; the second opti,on "Collect 4 missing collectibles" starts a new game if chos,en and the save data from the previous use gets deleted). When traveling to certain habitats, one of the children will be transformed into an animal (for a few examples, Arnold becomes a bullfrog in the swa;p, Dorothy Ann becomes an osposumling in the rainfore;t, Wanda becomes a sea otter in the tundra, and Tim becomes a parrt fish in the reef).

This is the first of the two games in the software to be created by KnowWonder Digital Mediaworks instead of Music Pen Multimedia (since starting with this game, Microsoft stopped collaborating with Music Pen and started collaborating with Know Wonder).

Superkids gave the game a score of 4.7/5.

Bangor Daily News said the game "is jampacked with unusual animals, interesting information, games, puzzles, and experiments".

=== Activity Centers ===
Like the final two games from the Magic School Bus original software (The Magic School Bus Explores Bugs and The Magic School Bus Explores the World of Animals), Microsoft for the activity center software games collaborated with KnowWonder Digital Mediaworks.

==== The Magic School Bus: In Concert Activity Center (2000) ====
This game was developed by KnowWonder and published by Microsoft.

It received a score of 76/100 by Review Corner and 60/100 by All Game Guide.

==== The Magic School Bus: Lands on Mars Activity Center (2000) ====
This game was developed by KnowWonder and published by Microsoft.

It received a score of 77/100 by Review Corner and 50/100 by All Game Guide. Superkids gave it 4.7/5.

==== The Magic School Bus: Whales and Dolphins Activity Center (2001) ====
This game was developed by KnowWonder and published by Microsoft.

It received a score of 90/100 by Tech with Kids (Computing with Kids), and 85/100 by Review Corner.

==== The Magic School Bus: Discovers Flight Activity Center (2001) ====
This game was developed by KnowWonder and published by Microsoft.

It received a score of 90/100 by Tech with Kids (Computing with Kids). Superkids gave it 4.3/5.

==== The Magic School Bus: Volcano Adventure Activity Center (2001) ====
This game was developed by KnowWonder and published by Microsoft.

It received a score of 90/100 by Tech with Kids (Computing with Kids), 83/100 by Review Corner, and 40/100 by Mac Addict.

== Console games ==
=== Scholastic's The Magic School Bus: Space Exploration Game (1995) ===
This was the first game created on a medium other than PC CD-ROM, (Sega Genesis). The premise was for the Magic School Bus to select a destination (starting with The Moon and reaching all the way out to Pluto). The game would then follow the same format; Ms. Frizzle would take off into outer space, and the player (as Phoebe) would have to find her. All missions consisted of flying to the planet (while taking photographs of various space objects, shooting apart meteors, and collecting "space buoys" for fuel), landing the bus on a platform successfully, traversing the planet on foot to find Ms. Frizzle, and putting together a sliding jigsaw puzzle to complete the stage.

Sega-16.com gave it 90/100, while Video Games & Computer Entertainment gave it 60/100.

A Sega Pico title under the same name was released in 1995. The game is about going to various places (such as the time of dinosaurs, the Solar System, etc.)

=== The Magic School Bus: Oceans (2011) ===
This game was developed by Big Blue Bubble Inc. and published by Scholastic for the Nintendo DS console.

== Mobile games ==
Published by Scholastic and released on Android and Apple devices as "Touch and tilt" storybooks that included games.

=== The Magic School Bus: Dinosaurs (2010) ===
Described as an interactive storybook, the app included a game with "7 different levels that explores where dinosaurs lived around the world."

=== The Magic School Bus: Oceans (2010) ===
Described as an interactive storybook, this one "features 1 highly re-playable game that includes over 20 animals in which children can play to earn points for more science facts and to travel to other areas of the ocean."
