= The Magic School Bus at the Waterworks =

1986 book by Joanna Cole

- Author: Joanna Cole
- Illustrator: Bruce Degen
- Language: English
- Series: The Magic School Bus
- Genre: Educational fiction
- Publisher: Scholastic
- Publication date: July 24, 1986
- Publication place: United States
- Media type: Print (hardcover and paperback) also audiobook
- Pages: 40
- ISBN: 0-590-40360-5
- OCLC: 33843132
- Followed by: The Magic School Bus inside the Earth

The Magic School Bus at the Waterworks is the first book in The Magic School Bus classic series books. Written by Joanna Cole and illustrated by Bruce Degen, it is a picture book and introduces most of the main characters of the series, including Ms. Frizzle, Arnold, Dorothy Ann, Ralphie (called "Ralph" in the book), Tim, Wanda and Liz as well as several students who did not appear in the TV series or any other multimedia outside of the original series books. Carlos, Keesha and Phoebe do not appear in this book, though a student called "John" in the book bears an uncanny physical resemblance to Carlos.

The book depicts the class's first field trip with Ms. Frizzle. Despite the title, the bus is not depicted as directly causing the strange events of the field trip as it would be in later books and the television series. In this book, strange events just seem to happen with no explanation and continue to happen after the kids leave the bus in a cloud.

== Synopsis ==
The book begins by introducing the character of Ms. Frizzle and describing her unusual teaching methods. Soon, she decides to take the class on a field trip to the waterworks, which the kids are sure will be boring, especially compared to the trips the kids in other classes go on. However, after driving through a tunnel, the bus becomes plastered with images of octopuses and everyone inside finds themselves wearing swimming outfits.

Once this occurs, the bus rises up into a cloud along with evaporating water. Ms. Frizzle makes all the kids get out of the bus. The kids did not want to leave, but she threatened to give them extra homework if they didn't. However, the kids begin shrinking once they're outside and, once they're each the size of a raindrop, they rain down into a river, which carries them into the town's water purification system. After going through the waterworks, the pipes take the class back to the school. They travel through the pipes into the girls' bathroom, and when a seventh grader girl turned on one of the faucets, the class came out of it. Once out of the faucet, they are instantly restored to their regular size and the clothes they were in before the tunnel (except for Ms. Frizzle, wearing a bizarre dress covered with octopus pictures).

Ms. Frizzle, however, appears to have no memory of the strange trip and the class later sees the bus outside. They wonder how it returned from the cloud and even consider that they may have imagined their whole adventure. The book ends with Ms. Frizzle informing them that they will be studying volcanoes next. The main story is then followed by two pages listing things that happened in the story that cannot happen in real life, as well as some trivia such as that the water purification system may completely differ from the one in the story.

== Notes ==
- Notably, the book does not portray the kids in the class as having very distinct personalities, although there are some hints that Arnold is more timid than the other students. However, in this book and the earlier books in the series, he appears to be more shy than anything.
- This book features the first instance of Arnold's infamous catchphrase from the television series, "I knew I should've stayed home today." In the book, however, he thinks it rather than saying it aloud.
- All of the books in the series feature "reports" supposedly written by students in the class and this book begins that with ten "water facts" each being presented by a different student. This book and the ones that follow also contain reports written specifically by Dorothy Ann that define new vocabulary words as they crop up in the story. This presumably led to her "know-it-all" personality in the television series.
- In this book, Liz appears to be a normal lizard and she only appears in the scenes taking place in the classroom. In the television series, she became considerably more anthropomorphic and joined the class on most of their field trips.
- The illustration of the waterworks on the book's cover does not match the illustrations of the waterworks that appear inside the book, despite both being drawn by Degen. However, in the television adaptation discussed below, the waterworks appear as seen on the book's cover.

== Television adaptation ==
In the second season of the Magic School Bus television series, the book was loosely adapted into the episode "Wet All Over," which featured a far greater amount of plot. In the episode, Arnold and Wanda collect water in the girls' bathroom and Arnold accidentally leaves Ms. Frizzle's key in there and forgets to turn off the water. While the class is on the field trip, Liz comically struggles to try and stop the bathroom from flooding.

Unlike in the book, the class is actually turned into water and the bus journeys with them on their trip through the water cycle. Being and behaving like water, they find themselves trapped in the water cycle and realize the only way they can escape is to get Ms. Frizzle's key back. This is when Arnold remembers he left the key in the bathroom and that he forgot to turn off the water. The bus manages to redirect them to the waterworks and they then travel through the pipes to get to the bathroom, where they get the key and are restored to their human forms.

When Arnold and the others get into a pickle jar in the following episode, referencing this episode, he will say "I hope we're not back in the water cycle".
