= The Magic School Bus Lost in the Solar System =

1994 children's book

- Author: Joanna Cole
- Illustrator: Bruce Degen
- Language: English
- Series: The Magic School Bus
- Genre: Educational fiction
- Publisher: Scholastic
- Publication date: October 18, 1990
- Publication place: United States
- Media type: Print (Hardback & Paperback) also Audio book
- Pages: 40
- ISBN: 0-590-41429-1
- OCLC: 33844928
- Preceded by: The Magic School Bus inside the Human Body
- Followed by: The Magic School Bus on the Ocean Floor

The Magic School Bus Lost in the Solar System is the fourth book in Joanna Cole and Bruce Degen's The Magic School Bus classic series books. Published in 1990, the book depicts arguably the most well-known adventure of the series and introduces the character of Arnold's cousin Janet.

== Synopsis ==
Ms. Frizzle's class is learning about the Solar System and Arnold's unpleasant cousin Janet, who constantly raves about herself, has joined them. The Friz decides to take the kids on a field trip to the planetarium. But once they get there, they find the planetarium is closed for repairs. However, on the way back to school, Ms. Frizzle pushes a button that makes the bus transform into a rocket and blast off into outer space.

Once in outer space, the bus flies to Earth's Moon, where the kids make the most of the lesser gravity. Ms. Frizzle then takes them to the Sun and then Mercury, Venus and Mars before flying into the asteroid belt. However, while in the belt, one of the bus's tail lights is damaged by an asteroid and the Friz flies out to fix the tail light with a tether line connecting her to the bus. However, the bus's autopilot malfunctions, causing the bus to fly off, breaking Ms. Frizzle's tether line and leaving her stranded in the asteroid belt.

Janet looks through the Friz's things and finds Ms. Frizzle's lesson book, which documents the information she is supposed to tell the kids during the field trip (complete with "Arnold, are you listening?" written into it.) Janet reads through the book as they pass the outer planets and until they pass Pluto, (Note: At the time of writing and airing of the episode, Pluto was still classified as a planet and only two Kuiper Belt objects (15760 Albion and (181708) 1993 FW) had been discovered) leaving the solar system. When the class got to Pluto, the Sun (because Pluto is far away from the Sun) did not look big anymore but it was a small yellow star. Janet then flips through the book and finds the instructions for the autopilot, so they can fly back to the asteroid belt and rescue Ms. Frizzle.

After they rescue the Friz, they return to Earth. The children tell various adults about their trips, but unfortunately, they do not believe them, thinking that instead it was all their imagination - perhaps some kind of game they played with their friends. The book then lists important reasons not to attempt this field trip in reality.

== Reception ==
Michele Landsberg of Entertainment Weekly gave a very positive review of the book, saying that, "The fun is irresistible and the information substantial [...]".

== Television adaptation ==
The book was adapted into the first episode of the Magic School Bus television series to be broadcast. It is likely not the first episode produced (i.e. the pilot episode) since Arnold at one point mentions that the class went on a field trip inside a rotten log, probably referring to the events of the episode The Magic School Bus Meets The Rot Squad. (He also mentions that they've gone to the bottom of the ocean, but they never did that until the 4th episode of the first season The Magic School Bus Gets Eaten.) The episode is infamous for its third act in which it unintentionally teaches that one could survive without a helmet in the vacuum of space if brought back into an oxygen-filled environment quickly enough.

For the most part, the episode remains faithful to the book. Most notably, in the episode, Janet's bragging about herself does not appear to be empty bragging and she constantly raves about how "proof" is needed for all extraordinary claims, prompting her to force Arnold to collect "proof" from every planet in the solar system, so she can prove to the students in her class that she actually traveled to all the planets. Also in this one Arnold surprisingly suggests going to outer space himself to prove to Janet the truth.

Also, instead of remaining in the asteroid belt, Ms. Frizzle uses her jet pack to fly off to another planet and provides the kids with clues as to her location via the radio on the bus. She, of course, turns out to be on Pluto. The ending is changed too, with all of Janet's possessions ("proof") falling out of the bus on Pluto and her refusing to leave without it. Janet refuses to go home without her possessions, while Arnold refuses to go home without her. Arnold (in protest against her desire for proof) demonstrates to Janet what would happen to her if she remains on Pluto by removing his space helmet. When he removes his helmet, it freezes him (despite Janet's pleads of Arnold not to do it) and forces Janet to leave Pluto immediately. As the kids get back on the bus, Janet (as she and the class are holding Arnold) says, "BACK TO EARTH!", and to Ms. Frizzle, she says, "AND STEP ON IT!". This ending, of course, makes Arnold the hero instead of Janet. Among arriving back to Earth, all Arnold got from the freeze-over was a cold, and then the alien-obsessed Ralphie fakes a news announcement about aliens (Plutonian aliens) discovered on Pluto, complaining about the big pile of litter that was dumped on their planet.

In the "Producer Says" segment, after the male producer and the Plutonian alien (from the phone call) talk about the field trip to outer space, the Plutonian alien reveals that she is "waiting for someone to get the pile of litter off of her planet".

Despite the producer segment indicating otherwise, it is not implausible that Arnold could survive exposure to the thin atmosphere of Pluto after removing his helmet for long enough to be rescued. The show does, however, repeat the urban legend that one could catch a cold from the cold. The common cold is a viral infectious disease and one particularly could not catch it in the virtually airless atmosphere of Pluto as Arnold does in the episode.

This episode also marks the introduction of Janet in the TV series, and it is also the first time the bus is driven by the kids or someone other than Ms. Frizzle (the bus does not appear to have autopilot in the episode).

== Software adaptation ==
The Magic School Bus Explores the Solar System
- Developer: Microsoft
- Publisher: Microsoft Home
- Series: The Magic School Bus
- Platforms: PC (Windows, Macintosh)
- Release: September 22, 1994
- Genre: Educational
- Mode: Single player

The Magic School Bus Explores the Solar System is the first software game developed based on the Magic School Bus series (The Magic School Bus Explores the Human Body was released the same year.) In the game, Ms. Frizzle is lost as soon as the bus flies off into space and got hit by a meteor in a meteor shower and the goal of the game is to locate her using the clues she provides. The Friz's hiding place varies throughout the game.

As would become the standard for the remainder of the games in the original software series, the main screen consists of the bus's dashboard, where the user can "drive" the bus to any of the nine planets or Earth's moon. Since Jupiter, Saturn, Uranus and Neptune lack solid surfaces, the Bus (unlike in the book and TV adaptations) in this version instead lands on one of their moons (Io for Jupiter, Mimas for Saturn, Miranda for Uranus and Triton for Neptune).

Once on a planet, the user can exit the bus, where a strange satellite called the "whatsit" must be clicked on to bring up an arcade-styled game in which the user, controlling one of the students, must collect one of Ms. Frizzle's tokens (giant coins with Ms. Frizzle's face on them) which provide the user with a clue as to the Friz's whereabouts and activate the "Friz-finder." There are only three clues available, but tokens will still need to be collected to activate the "Friz-finder" after all the clues have been exhausted. Clicking on the "Friz-finder" will determine whether Ms. Frizzle is anywhere on the current planet. If she is, then the game is completed, but if she is not then the user will have to collect another token to activate the "Friz-finder" to try again.

=== Notes ===
- In three of the Magic School Bus games, Liz has the ability to speak (only the player can hear her).
- Most of the voices in the software sound similar to those in the TV series, except for Ms. Frizzle. Lily Tomlin did not reprise the role in the game, being replaced by Tina Marie Goff.
- When Keesha says "It's really cloudy down here", her voice is that of Phoebe's. Similar goofs happened in other software; Phoebe speaks in Keesha's voice showing her report about the Small Intestines, Dorothy Ann has Keesha and Phoebe's voices and not her own while exploring the Large Intestines, and Ralphie speaks in Tim's voice saying how ugly garbage is on the beach.
