= The Magic School Bus Rides Again =

Animated television series (2017–2021)

- Genre: Children's television series; Educational
- Based on: The Magic School Bus by Joanna Cole; Bruce Degen
- Directed by: Richard Weston
- Voices of: Kate McKinnon; Lily Tomlin
- Theme music composer: Peter Lurye
- Opening theme: "Ride on the Magic School Bus", performed by Lin-Manuel Miranda
- Ending theme: various ending themes
- Composer: Eggplant Productions (Note: A team of music composers consisting of Steve D'Angelo, Lorenzo Castelli and Terry Tompkins)
- Countries of origin: United States; Canada
- Original language: English
- No. of seasons: 3
- No. of episodes: 30 (list of episodes)

Production
- Executive producers: Vince Commisso; Steven Jarosz; Iole Lucchese; Tamara Rothernberg; Jocelyn Stevenson; Andy Yeatman; Deborah Forte
- Running time: 25 minutes
- Production companies: Scholastic Entertainment; 9 Story Media Group; Brown Bag Films

Original release
- Network: Netflix
- Release: September 29, 2017 – November 9, 2021

Related
- The Magic School Bus (1994–1997)

The Magic School Bus Rides Again is an animated children's television series, based on the book series of the same name by Joanna Cole and Bruce Degen. Produced by Scholastic Entertainment and 9 Story Media Group, it serves as a continuation of the 1994–1997 PBS Kids series The Magic School Bus, with Lily Tomlin reprising her role as Ms. Frizzle. The series premiered on Netflix on September 29, 2017, and the second season premiered on April 13, 2018.

The series made its television channel debut on Qubo on November 1, 2020, and aired until the channel ceased broadcasting on February 28, 2021.

Three 45-minute specials: “Kids in Space,” “The Frizz Connection,” and “In the Zone,” premiered on Netflix in 2020. A fourth special, "Goldstealer" was never released on Netflix but was instead included on the specials’ Region 1 DVD release exclusive to Canada, which names them the third and final season. (Note: Referred to on the DVD and on the Knowledge Kids website as the second season, since the DVD releases by 9 Story themselves and the series’ production order merge the first two Netflix seasons into one.) They were dedicated to Joanna Cole, the author of the original books, who died in 2020.

== Plot ==
In the sequel to the original animated television series, the flagship Valerie Frizzle (now Professor Frizzle) gets her Ph.D. and retires from teaching at Walkerville Elementary School. She passes the keys of the Magic School Bus to her younger sister, Ms. Fiona Frizzle, who replaces her as the class's teacher. The kids journey on exciting new field trips, discovering new locations, creatures, time periods and more to learn about the wonders of science, educating viewers along the way, on the eponymous Magic School Bus.

== Voice cast ==
=== Main ===
- Kate McKinnon as Ms. Fiona Felicity Frizzle
- Lily Tomlin as Professor Valerie Felicity Frizzle, Ph.D.
- Miles Koseleci-Vieira (Seasons 1–2) and Roman Lutterotti (specials) as Arnold Matthew Perlstein
- Lynsey Pham as Wanda Li
- Mikaela Blake as Keesha Franklin
- Gabby Clarke as Dorothy Ann "D.A." Hudson
- Leke Maceda-Rustecki as Carlos Ramon
- Matthew Mintz (Seasons 1–2) and Matthew Mucci (specials) as Ralphie Alessandro Giuseppe Tennelli
- Birva Pandya as Jyoti Kaur (new student after Phoebe Terese went back to her old school)
- Kaden Stephen as Timothy "Tim" Wright

=== Guest stars ===
- Will Arnett as Galapagos Gil ("Frizzle of the Future")
- Mae Jemison as Keesha's favorite celebrity astronaut, Kathy K. Kuiper ("Space Mission: Selfie")
- Sandra Oh as Dr. Sarah Bellum ("Ralphie Strikes a Nerve")
- Jay Baruchel as Dr. Tillage ("Ghost Farm")
- Nathan Fillion as Dorothy Ann's famous scientist uncle, Dr. Axle Valvestuck ("Waste Not, Want Not")
- Catherine O'Hara as Aunt Tennelli and Teresina Tennelli, Ralphie's trapeze-artist aunt and cousin ("Ralphie and the Flying Tennellis")
- Martin Short as Tony Tennelli, also in Ralphie's family who works in the circus ("Ralphie and the Flying Tennellis")
- Lin-Manuel Miranda as Matthew Math Matthews ("Ralphie and the Flying Tennellis")
- Chris Hadfield as himself ("Kids in Space")
- Lights as Maven, Ms. Frizzle's pop-star cousin ("In the Zone")
- Annie Guglia as herself ("Goldstealer")

=== Additional voices ===
- Lilly Bartlam
- Amos Crawley as Mr. Hudson, Dorothy Ann's father ("The Tales Glaciers Tell"). Crawley voiced Arnold in season 1 of the original series.
- Annelise Forbes as Arnold's cousin, Janet Perlstein
- Lisa Jai as Mrs. Li, Wanda's mother and as a caller in the Professor Frizzle segments ("The Magnetic Mambo", "The Tales Glaciers Tell", "The Land Before Tim", "Ghost Farm" and "Ralphie and the Flying Tennellis"). Jai was the voice of Wanda in the original series, where Mrs. Li was voiced by Rosalind Chao.
- Julie Lemieux as additional voices and the titular "Goldstealer" ("Goldstealer")
- Ana Sani as Pariksha, Jyoti's grandmother ("Nothin' but Net").
- Stuart Stone as the Gizmos That Go staff ("Three in One"), the Cosmic Corner Show announcer ("Space Mission: Selfie"), and a caller in the Professor Frizzle Segment ("Ghost Farm"). Stone was the voice of Ralphie in the original series.
- Jamie Watson
- Marcus Craig as Mikey Ramon, Carlos' younger brother ("The Good, the Bad, and the Gnocchi").
- Martin Roach as Mr. Ruhle
- Kevin Vidal

== Episodes ==
=== Series overview ===
Season	Episodes	Originally released	
Season	Episodes	First released	Last released
1	13	September 29, 2017	
2	13	April 13, 2018	
3	4	August 7, 2020	November 9, 2021

=== Season 1 (2017) ===
In production order and on the 2019 region 1 DVD release of the first two seasons, this is considered the first half of the first season.

No. overall	No. in season	Title	Topic	Directed by	Written by	Original release date
1	1	"Frizzle of the Future"	Ecosystem	Richard Weston	John May & Suzanne Bolch	September 29, 2017
It's a new year in Walkerville Elementary, but to the kids' surprise, Ms. Frizzle (now Professor Frizzle) has gotten a PhD and retired (foreshadowed in the original series episode, "Works Out"). However, Arnold is nervous that the new teacher, Professor Frizzle's sister, will alter the class "ecosystem". Meanwhile, the new student, Jyoti, wonders how she will fit in to this "ecosystem". Phoebe is no longer with the class because she went back to her old school.
2	2	"Pigs in the Wind"	Engineering Aeroelastic Buildings	Richard Weston	Mike McPhaden	September 29, 2017
Keesha is directing her classmates in a play about a sequel to "The Three Little Pigs". However, she becomes nervous about the level of realism after learning that Arnold's cousin, Janet, plans to review the play on her blog. Upon hearing this, Ms. Frizzle takes the class to a forest where the wind-resistant properties of trees can be seen firsthand.
3	3	"In the Swim"	Fish Adaptations	Richard Weston	John May & Suzanne Bolch	September 29, 2017
While most of Ms. Frizzle's class is thrilled to go on a field trip to Hawaii, Wanda longs for a trip that can help conservation efforts. Searching underwater, she finds a lone fish and becomes concerned about its ability to survive. Ms. Frizzle responds by giving everyone a close-up look at how fish evade predators deeper in the ocean.
4	4	"The Battle for Rock Mountain"	Rock Cycle (Rock layers/Fossils & Erosion)	Richard Weston	John May & Suzanne Bolch	September 29, 2017
Tim is drawing a comic to be preserved in Walkerville's time capsule. Asking the others for inspiration, Arnold provides a character named Captain Rock Man, while Ralphie suggests that he could get into a battle with Weatherman, his persona in the original series episode, "Kicks Up a Storm". The other students are gradually worked into the comic as they learn more about the various transformations rocks can undergo.
5	5	"The Magnetic Mambo"	Magnetism	Richard Weston	Jennifer Daley	September 29, 2017
During a talent show rehearsal, the dance numbers are not up to Ralphie's standard. Ms. Frizzle likens this to the random arrangement of atoms in Ralphie's whistle and shrinks the students so that they can go inside. After they visit a deposit of magnetite, they go inside again and see a more orderly arrangement since the whistle is paramagnetic.
6	6	"Carlos Gets the Sneezes"	Allergies	Richard Weston	George Arthur Bloom	September 29, 2017
In a throwback to the original series episode, "Inside Ralphie", Carlos brings a rat as the class pet, but then he starts sneezing uncontrollably. As Miss Fiona and the class investigate inside Carlos's immune system, they find that Carlos is being exposed to something that is giving him allergies. At first, they believe it's the rat, but later they discover it was pollen that got stuck in the rat's fur.
7	7	"Hides and Seeks"	Camouflage	Richard Weston	Betty Quan	September 29, 2017
During a school-wide hide and seek game, Ms. Frizzle's students are concerned about a proficient player and ask for advice on how to hide from her. Leaving Tim, Jyoti and Ralphie in the game, the others travel to the rainforest and relay what they learn about camouflage in real time.
8	8	"Three in One"	States of Matter (Solid, Liquid & Gas)	Richard Weston	Jocelyn Stevenson	September 29, 2017
Jyoti is trying to think of a project idea for a competition called "Gizmos That Go". Ms. Frizzle takes her and her classmates inside an ice cube so that they can see what happens when it melts and then boils. Inspired by this, Jyoti's entry becomes a bumper cars ride with three phases.
9	9	"Space Mission: Selfie"	Satellites	Richard Weston	Mike McPhaden	September 29, 2017
Before an upcoming game, Walkerville Elementary is unable to broadcast footage of its soccer field due to a malfunctioning satellite apparently owned by the Frizzle family. When the class goes into orbit to investigate, Keesha considers it a perfect opportunity to put the finishing touches on her application to astronaut camp. While trying to get a selfie, she accidentally destroys other satellites which makes the mission more complicated.
10	10	"The Tales Glaciers Tell"	Climate Change, Carbon Dioxide, Ice, Glaciers	Richard Weston	Story by : Josh Gal; Teleplay by : Jocelyn Stevenson, John May & Suzanne Bolch	September 29, 2017
Dorothy Ann is eager to impress her parents in an upcoming storytelling performance. When she and her classmates travel to a glacier, Ms. Frizzle teaches them that each of its layers holds a record of the past. This provides inspiration for a story about carbon dioxide levels.
11	11	"Ralphie Strikes a Nerve"	Nerves and the Human Brain	Richard Weston	Bernice Vanderlaan	September 29, 2017
In a remake of the original series episode, "Flexes Its Muscles", Ralphie urges his classmates to build a cheer-leading robot to help in a volleyball game against Janet's team. Although Ms. Frizzle is able to have the chassis built quickly, the students observe Jyoti's brain in order to get the idea to co-ordinate its movements with pneumatic tubes. To prevent Ralphie from getting tired, they build a second command center for Keesha to control the autonomic functions.
12	12	"Monster Power"	Renewable Energy	Richard Weston	Merrill Hagan	September 29, 2017
Ms. Frizzle takes the class to go camping, but Arnold brings along several lights, because he is afraid that a horror film he recently watched will come true. Since there is no electricity grid nearby, Arnold and his classmates learn how to harness wind and water currents for the purpose of powering the lights.
13	13	"DA and the Deep Blue Sea"	Ocean Zones	Richard Weston	Evan Thaler Hickey	September 29, 2017
While preparing to write a blog post about the ocean, Dorothy Ann gathers data with an advanced locket belonging to Jyoti's grandmother. When her fishing line breaks, and she loses the locket, Ms. Frizzle turns the bus into a submarine in order to help find it. Along the way, the gang goes and learns about undersea life and different depths.

=== Season 2 (2018) ===
In production order and on the 2019 Region 1 DVD release, this is considered the second half of the first season.

No. overall	No. in season	Title	Topic	Directed by	Written by	Original release date
14	1	"The Land Before Tim"	Fossils	Richard Weston	Brian Hartigan	April 13, 2018
The class is set to compete on a gameshow about fossils hosted by Tim's idol. In order to prepare, they go back in time and become dinosaur fossils which form as Pangea breaks apart into the continents familiar to humans.
15	2	"Claw and Order"	Birds	Richard Weston	Jennifer Daley	April 13, 2018
Wanda befriends a magpie but Ms. Frizzle's other students become suspicious of him after seeing that the classroom has been ransacked by a bird. They subsequently travel the world learning about the different adaptations birds have.
16	3	"Ghost Farm"	Harvesting	Richard Weston	Mike McPhaden	April 13, 2018
Wanda is organizing a fall fair but she has forgotten that it will need food. Ralphie mentions that he knows a nearby farm which is reportedly haunted. With no other options, they travel to the farm and find that the supposedly possessed vehicles have been programmed to tend to the crops by an agricultural scientist.
17	4	"Nothin' But Net"	Computer Codes	Richard Weston	John May & Suzanne Bolch	April 13, 2018
Jyoti is sending a virtual hug to her grandmother (who was mentioned in "DA in the Deep Blue Sea") with the help of Ms. Frizzle and the Magic School Bus's "Super Scanner", which was recently installed. However, when Arnold drops in and accidentally uses the Super Scanner on himself, he is turned into an email attachment. The other students digitize themselves and the Magic School Bus as they enter the fiber-optic cables of the Internet, ensuring that their packets are sent to the same place.
18	5	"I Spy with my Animal Eyes"	Eyes	Richard Weston	Emma Kassirer	April 13, 2018
While the rest of the class is on a field trip into Arnold's left eye, Arnold turns his back on the class pet, Ratney (from "Carlos Gets the Sneezes") for a minute and loses her. Ms. Frizzle helps in the search by turning the Magic School Bus into several local animals to give the students a sense of how they see.
19	6	"Ready, Set, Fail!"	The Engineering Process and Failures Lead to Success	Richard Weston	Evan Thaler Hickey	April 13, 2018
Ralphie reads about a gem on an exoplanet that can help him pass tests without studying. After learning that the planet has a magnetic field which is impenetrable to the Magic School Bus, the class designs a rover and builds five iterations, improving it each time. When they acquire the gem, they learn that it was left by Professor Frizzle in order to entice them to think like engineers.
20	7	"The Good, the Bad, and the Gnocchi"	Simple Machines	Richard Weston	Bernice Vanderlaan	April 13, 2018
When Ralphie is showing the class his family's pasta display, Carlos is in a race with his brother Mikey (from "Getting Energized" and "Gets Programmed"). Ms. Frizzle involves the rest of the class in their race when she notices that the corrugated pasta surface makes for an ideal obstacle course. The Magic School Bus then shrinks and goes inside the restaurant to the pasta display, which leads to a Western-themed race between Carlos and Mikey, whose success hinges on simple machines. But they approach many obstacles, such as an avalanche of Latin alphabet noodles, a steep mountain made of cheese, and Ralphie's dog.
21	8	"Send in the Clouds"	Clouds	Richard Weston	Mike McPhaden	April 13, 2018
When Jyoti invents a new type of umbrella, she misses the opportunity to impress investors because it is not raining. To find out more about why it rains, she and her classmates go on a field trip inside clouds. Wanda tries to build a collection of clouds along the way which has the side effect of unleashing a thunderstorm.
22	9	"Ralphie and the Flying Tennellis"	Using Math in Real Life Scenarios	Richard Weston	John May & Suzanne Bolch	April 13, 2018
After Ralphie claims that math is useless, circus performers in his family ask him to fill in for their missing acrobat. His position on math changes when the class finds out that precise calculations are needed to execute a trapeze jump.
23	10	"Tim and the Talking Trees"	Plant & Animal Communication/Interaction	Richard Weston	Nathalie Younglai	April 13, 2018
When Tim opines that trees talk to each other, the class is divided on whether to believe him. When Ms. Frizzle takes the students to the forest, they learn that trees can form a colony with the help of fungal mycelia.
24	11	"Waste Not, Want Not"	Utilizing Waste/Fertilisation	Richard Weston	Evan Thaler Hickey	April 13, 2018
Dorothy Ann is preparing a musical about flowers but the orchids she has been growing for it are withering. When they try to find fertilizer to enrich the soil, the other students are dismayed to learn that it comes from feces. They overcome their aversion as Ms. Frizzle teaches them about the nutrient cycle. When it is time to perform, Arnold works these concepts into a cover of Elton John's "Circle of Life".
25	12	"Janet's Mystery Gene"	DNA	Richard Weston	Bernice Vanderlaan	April 13, 2018
Carlos is arguing with Janet about which book they should read to the kindergarten class. They decide that Ms. Frizzle should lead a field trip into Janet's cells where her DNA can be found. After attempting to edit her personality and accidentally editing too much, the students struggle to put Janet back together by the time the storytelling session starts.
26	13	"Making Magic"	Sun	Richard Weston	Suzanne Bolch, John May & Mike McPhaden	April 13, 2018
The class travels to the sun and brings along an eager Principal Ruhle (from the original series) who believes the trip to be a simulation. When they get to the center, Arnold risks his life to prevent the Bus from running out of power.

=== Specials/Season 3 (2020–21) ===
After a hiatus, four 44-minute specials were released in the early 2020s. The first three released throughout late 2020 individually on Netflix, while a fourth, “Goldstealer,” was scrapped and instead made it to the specials’ DVD release on November 9, 2021. They comprise the show’s second production cycle. For the specials, the show gains a new animation style; the human characters use lineless 2D puppet animation, and the Magic School Bus is animated in CGI in most scenes. The new art style also resolves controversy from the beginning of the series surrounding Keesha and Tim by redesigning them to have darker skin. These specials are dedicated to the author of The Magic School Bus book series, the late Joanna Cole, whose death occurred in 2020. Despite the specials not being attached to a season on Netflix and being separate from the main show on the platform, they are considered proper episodes of the show on the region 1 DVD release and on Knowledge Network, which group them into the third and final season.

No. overall	No. in season	Title	Topic	Directed by	Written by	Original release date
27	1	"Kids in Space"	International Space Station	Richard Weston	David Skelly	August 7, 2020
Ms. Frizzle and the kids have undergone training procedures and travel to the International Space Station in the Magic School Bus. When Ralphie accidentally uses the Bus' remote control (here referred to as its name from "Butterfly and the Bog Beast", the Porta-Shrinker) to turn a tardigrade into a mutant, water-seeking beast, the kids must find out where to find the Porta-Shrinker (as Ralphie lost it) so it can return to its normal size.
28	2	"The Frizz Connection"	Air Currents	Richard Weston	Evan Thaler Hickey	October 20, 2020
Ms. Frizzle takes the students to the Albuquerque International Balloon Fiesta on the hot-air bus for Arnold's birthday. Along the way, the students are caught in an electric storm. When the Magic School Bus gets hit by lightning, it is cloned into three hot air balloons and Ms. Frizzle is split into three distinct parts reflecting her personality (The Frizz being her humor, Fiona being her bravery, and Ms. Frizzle being her intelligence). The three buses are scattered across the world, each having a different group of three students (Liz included). The groups of students navigate the Frizzle Fragments to Albuquerque and join them together before Ms. Frizzle fades from existence.
29	3	"In the Zone"	Time Zones	Richard Weston	Jennifer Skelly, Jocelyn Stevenson, Evan Thaler Hickey	December 26, 2020
Ms. Frizzle has taken the kids to see her cousin, Maven, in concert on New Year's Eve. New Year's Eve is also the day when the Magic School Bus installs a 13GB update for its MagicWare (the software that gives it its magical properties), and it finishes at 12:00. Since the kids were traveling the world, the Bus has been reinstalling its software in every time zone, causing it to glitch and malfunction (the kids transform, shrink, and age while the Bus transforms into different vehicles). This causes Maven to cancel the tour and head to Walkerville. Still, instead of Walkerville, the malfunctioning Bus eventually turns on autopilot and travels to the South Pole, where it glitches once more. When they get to Walkerville, its MagicWare eventually crashes. It reboots when the kids reset its clock to solar time because it is dependent on the time on its internal clock.
30	4	"Goldstealer"	Classical Mechanics and Kinematics (specifically speed, velocity, and friction)	Richard Weston	Mike McPhaden	November 9, 2021
After professional bicyclist Angela Franklin, one of Keesha's two mothers, is framed for stealing the gold medal for the World Wheel Games, a bicycle race that takes place every 3.14 years, the class works together as a group of spies to clear her name. The real gold stealer is revealed to be Franklin's racing rival, Laura Smythe, who did it out of spite after Franklin was given first place the prior race when Smythe was disqualified for cheating. Using what they learned about velocity and speed, and how it is impacted by friction (previously discussed in The Magic School Bus episode, "Plays Ball"), the students make it back to the course in time to prove Franklin's innocence so she can participate and win the race, and have Laura Smythe arrested for her crimes.

== Production ==
On June 10, 2014, the series was first announced by Netflix and Scholastic Media, and was titled The Magic School Bus 360°. The new iteration of the franchise features a modernized "Ms. Frizzle" (replacing Valerie with her younger sister Fiona) and a high-tech bus that stresses modern inventions such as robotics, wearables and camera technology. The hope is to captivate children's imaginations and motivate their interest in the sciences. It was produced by 9 Story Media Group. Producer Stuart Stone, who voiced Ralphie in the original series, stated that The Magic School Bus 360° will feature some of the original voice actors in different roles. The show's voice cast is based in Los Angeles, California, United States and Toronto, Ontario, Canada with Susan Blu as the Los Angeles voice director and Alyson Court as the Toronto voice director. In February 2017, Kate McKinnon was cast in the role of Ms. Frizzle (without clarifying it was Fiona, the younger sister of Valerie, now Professor Frizzle, still voiced by Tomlin). The series then changed its name to The Magic School Bus Rides Again. The series was released on Netflix on September 29, 2017. The second season was released on April 13, 2018.

Lin-Manuel Miranda of Hamilton sings the theme song. Phoebe Terese, a character from the original series, is replaced by a new student named Jyoti, as it was revealed that Phoebe transferred back to her old school. The episode endings feature question and answer sessions with Professor Frizzle, echoing the segments about viewers calling the producer which accompanied the original series on commercial-free channels. Despite clarifying some creative license taken in the episode, these scenes are still set in a universe with magical vehicles. Among other changes, the students still wear the same clothes every day but they do not resemble those from the original series. Three 45–minute specials were released in 2020: the first special The Magic School Bus Rides Again: Kids in Space was released on August 7, the second named The Magic School Bus Rides Again: The Frizz Connection on October 20 a third titled The Magic School Bus Rides Again: In the Zone on December 26, and a fourth titled The Magic School Bus Rides Again: Goldstealer which came out exclusively on DVD. The artstyle was changed for the specials as the characters have no outlines and the lighting and shading are more detailed.

== Critical reception ==
Why has this good-natured show already received an inordinate amount of judgement? How can this much vitriol be thrown at a creation before anyone has even seen it?

— Cody Schmitz, Decider

After the series' announcement and the release of its trailer, there was initial resistance to the new art style, absence of Lily Tomlin as Ms. Frizzle, and fear it would not live up to the original series. AOL accused the show of giving Ms. Frizzle a nose job. Bustle put this down to fans of the show being "protective of its legacy".

Despite this speculation, the series has been critically acclaimed upon release. Common Sense Media deemed the show a worthy successor to its 1990s sister series, praising its gender and ethnic diversity and its commitment to teaching children about STEM subjects. Christianity Today argues that the show managed to keep the "genius of the franchise", which is that the children are almost more intrigued by the complexity and order of the natural world rather than the magic of the titular school bus. Daily Dot praised the series' premiere for addressing the change to the show's structure, putting viewers at ease through the transition, adding that the science was made "approachable". The Houstonian found the episodes' scenarios to be "pretty interesting", commenting on the academical and moral lessons. The AV Club felt the series lives up to its predecessor, and contains the same "goofy humor and ease with making learning fun". Another AV Club article wrote that the series is "lively, fast-paced, and exceedingly tolerable for adults", and full of enough science to allow them to park their kids in front of it guilt-free.

Some users on social media have accused the show of whitewashing the black characters.

== Awards and nominations ==
Year	Nominee / work	Award	Result
2018	The Magic School Bus Rides Again	Parent's Choice Silver Honor - Spring 2018 Television	Won
2018	The Magic School Bus Rides Again	Common Sense "Great For Families" seal	Won
2018	Annellie Rose Samuel for episode "Space Mission: Selfie"	Canadian Cinema Editors Award for Best Editing in Animation	Nominated
