= Lisa Yamanaka =

Canadian actress and voice actress

- Born: Toronto, Ontario, Canada
- Other names: Lisa Boynton; Lisa Jai
- Occupation: Actress
- Years active: 1988–present

Lisa Jai Yamanaka is a Japanese Canadian actress. She is best known as the voice of Wanda Li in The Magic School Bus, and Sherry Birkin in the 1998 video game Resident Evil 2. Her other roles include Yoko in Timothy Goes to School, Fizz in the US version of Tweenies, and Isabelle in the Babar series. She is also credited as Lisa Boynton and Lisa Jai.

== Career ==
Yamanaka was born in Toronto, Ontario, Canada, where she stayed until 2008 until she moved to Los Angeles, California before moving back to Toronto in 2011. She attended Central Commerce Collegiate Institute in Toronto, Ontario. Yamanaka was awarded the Unsung Hero Award by the City of Toronto 2012 for her advocacy work in diversity in the mainstream media. She debuted her first theatre production in Watts, Los Angeles, as Isela Sanchez in Lynn Manning's 'The Unrequited: A tale between two Worlds' with Cornerstone Theater and Watts Village Theater. She has also become an advocate for disabled actors, having developed rheumatoid arthritis. As of 2018, Yamanaka focuses her time on theatre, independent films, and advocacy. She is also a published poet and spoken-word artist, having performed at the inaugural event Poetic Fashion. She has also performed spoken word in Los Angeles, New York, and Swaziland.

== Filmography ==
=== Film ===
Year	Title	Role	Notes
1989	Babar: The Movie	Isabelle (voice)	
1992	This Is My Life	Shawn	
1994	Mirabelle and Me	Gwendolyn (voice)	Television film; animated sequences only
1995	Nilus the Sandman: The First Day	Girl	Television film
1996	Balance of Power	Jasmine Matsumoto	
2010	Creed	Asia	
2013	Sisters	Crystal	Short film
2014	The Window	News Anchor	
2014	Lost Angels	Louise	
2014	Runaway Dream	Linn	Short film

=== Television ===
Year	Title	Role	Notes
1988	My Secret Identity	Megan	Episode: "You've Got a Friend"
1989–1991	Babar	Flora (1989–1990), Isabelle (1991) (voice)	65 episodes
1989	T. and T.	Kim	Episode: "Family Honour"
1990	Little Rosey	Nonny, Tater (voice)	
1990	The Raccoons	Patty (voice)	Episode: "Endless Summer!"
1991	Rupert	Additional Voices (voice)	13 episodes
1993	Tales from the Cryptkeeper	Becky (voice)	Episode: "Nature"
1994	Monster Force	Additional Voices (voice)	13 episodes
1994–1997	The Magic School Bus	Wanda Li (voice)	52 episodes
1995	Squawk Box	Various	
1995	The Neverending Story	The Childlike Empress, Junior Rockbiter (voice)	13 episodes
1995	Mr. Dressup	Herself (guest)	1 episode
1996–1998	Stickin' Around	Ashley (voice)	
1999–2002	Tweenies	Fizz (voice)	US version
2000	Twice in a Lifetime	Georgia	Episode: "Pride and Prejudice"
2000–2001	Timothy Goes to School	Yoko (voice)	26 episodes
2001–2002	Medabots	Erika Amazake (voice)	
2001–2003	George Shrinks	Ellen / Ronnie Ribnod / Winifred	5 episodes
2010–2012	Pillars of Freedom	Spirit (voice)	26 episodes
2013	Trail Mix	Holly	Episode: "The Trail Mix Crew"
2013	Apartment Manager	Lisa	Episode: "Unit 4"
2017	The Magic School Bus Rides Again	Mrs. Li, William Li, Caller (voice)	Episode: "The Magnetic Mambo"

=== Video games ===
Year	Title	Role	Notes
1998	Resident Evil 2	Sherry Birkin	
2000	Dino Crisis 2	Paula Morton	
