= The Magic School Bus (TV series) =

Animated children's television series (1994–1997)

- Genre: Educational; Adventure; Comedy; Science fantasy
- Based on: The Magic School Bus by: Joanna Cole; Bruce Degen
- Developed by: Alison Blank; Kristin Laskas Martin; Jane Startz
- Directed by: Lawrence Jacobs (season 1); Charles E. Bastien (seasons 2–3); Susan Blu (voice director); Dan Hennessey (voice director) (season 4)
- Voices of: Lily Tomlin; Malcolm-Jamal Warner; Lisa Yamanaka; Amos Crawley; Danny Tamberelli; Daniel DeSanto; Tara Meyer; Erica Luttrell; Maia Filar; Stuart Stone; Max Beckford; Andre Ottley-Lorant
- Theme music composer: Peter Lurye
- Opening theme: "Ride on the Magic School Bus", performed by Little Richard
- Ending theme: "Ride on the Magic School Bus" (instrumental)
- Composers: Peter Lurye; Fred Barton (seasons 2–4)
- Countries of origin: United States; Canada
- Original language: English
- No. of seasons: 4
- No. of episodes: 52 (list of episodes)

Production
- Executive producers: Jane Startz (seasons 1–3); Alison Blank (seasons 1–3); Kristin Laskas Martin (seasons 3–4); Deborah Forte; Marty Keltz; Patrick Loubert; Michael Hirsh; Clive A. Smith (seasons 2–4)
- Producers: Hasmi Giakoumis (season 1); Vince Commisso (seasons 2–4)
- Running time: 26 minutes
- Production companies: South Carolina ETV; Nelvana Limited; Scholastic Productions

Original release
- Network: PBS
- Release: September 10, 1994 – December 6, 1997

Related
- The Magic School Bus Rides Again

The Magic School Bus is an animated educational children's television series developed by Alison Blank, Kristin Laskas Martin, and Jane Startz, and based on the book series of the same name by Joanna Cole and Bruce Degen. Originally broadcast on PBS from September 10, 1994 to December 6, 1997, with reruns airing on PBS until September 25, 1998, the series received critical acclaim for its use of celebrity voice talent, as well as combining entertainment with an educational series. The series stars Lily Tomlin as the voice of Ms. Frizzle, with Amos Crawley, Danny Tamberelli, Daniel DeSanto, Lisa Yamanaka, Stuart Stone, Erica Luttrell, Tara Meyer, Maia Filar, Max Beckford, Andre Ottley-Lorant, and Malcolm-Jamal Warner in supporting roles. The theme song is performed by Little Richard.

== Premise ==
The animated series follows the adventures of eccentric teacher Ms. Frizzle and her eight students as they explore the wonders of science on their exciting field trips. Their journey takes them to different locations, time periods, and encounters with various creatures, all while learning about science and the world around them. The school they attend, Walkerville Elementary, is set in the fictitious town of Walkerville. The characters travel all over the world and into space throughout the duration of the show.

== Voice cast ==
Main characters from left to right: Carlos, Dorothy Ann, Tim, Wanda, Liz, Ms. Frizzle, Ralphie, Keesha, Phoebe, and Arnold

=== Main ===
- Lily Tomlin as Ms. Valerie Frizzle
- Amos Crawley (season 1) and Danny Tamberelli (seasons 2–4) as Arnold Perlstein
- Daniel DeSanto as Carlos Ramon
- Tara Meyer as Dorothy Ann "D.A." Hudson
- Erica Luttrell as Keesha Franklin
- Maia Filar as Phoebe Terese
- Stuart Stone as Ralphie Tennelli
- Max Beckford (season 1) and Andre Ottley-Lorant (seasons 2–4) as Timothy "Tim" Wright
- Lisa Yamanaka as Wanda Li

=== Guest stars ===
- Malcolm-Jamal Warner as the Male Producer
- Susan Blu as the Female Producer
- Renessa Blitz as Janet Perlstein, Arnold's cousin
- Rosalind Chao as Mrs. Li, Wanda's mother
- Tyne Daly as Dr. Tennelli, Ralphie's mother
- Dana Elcar as Mr. Terese, Phoebe's father
- Elliott Gould as Mr. Perlstein, Arnold's father
- Eartha Kitt as Mrs. Franklin, Keesha's grandmother
- Swoosie Kurtz as Mrs. Hudson, D.A.'s mother
- Edward James Olmos as Mr. Ramon, Carlos' father
- Dolly Parton as Katrina Eloise "Murph" Murphy
- Kevin Zegers as Mikey Ramon, Carlos' brother
- Ed Asner as General Araneus
- Ed Begley Jr. as Logway Larry
- Robby Benson as Archibald Seedplot
- Carol Channing as Professor Cornelia C. Contralto II
- Dabney Coleman as Horace Scope
- Dom DeLuise as a Desperate Baker
- Matt Frewer as the Inspector
- Sherman Hemsley as Mr. Junkett
- Wynonna Judd as Molly Cule
- Dan Marino as Mr. Garth Sinew
- Malcolm McDowell as Mr. McClean
- Rita Moreno as Dr. Carmina Skeledon
- Bebe Neuwirth as Flora Whiff
- Tony Randall as R.U. Humerus
- Alex Trebek as show-and-tell host
- Jessica Walter as Ashley Walker-Club-Dupree
- Cindy Williams as Geri Poveri
- Paul Winfield as Principal Ruhle
- Michael York as Harry Herp

== Episodes ==
| Season | Episodes | Originally released | |
| Season | Episodes | First released | Last released |
|---|---|---|---|
| 1 | 13 | September 10, 1994 | December 3, 1994 |
| 2 | 13 | September 9, 1995 | December 2, 1995 |
| 3 | 13 | September 14, 1996 | December 25, 1996 |
| 4 | 13 | September 13, 1997 | December 6, 1997 |

== Production ==
In early 1991, The Magic School Bus concept was co-produced into an animated series of the same name by Scholastic. The NSF was the first to commit to funding a pilot animatic that helped to inform the series' development. Creation and testing of the pilot were completed early in 1992. Meanwhile, other funders, including the Carnegie Corporation of New York and the U.S. Department of Energy, joined the effort, enabling Scholastic Productions to begin scripting while looking for a corporate underwriter. In early 1993, Lily Tomlin signed on to play Ms. Frizzle, and Malcolm-Jamal Warner agreed to play The Producer. The show went into full production with Nelvana. It premiered on Saturday September 10, 1994. Craig Walker (former vice president and senior editorial director of Scholastic) developed the idea for the show. The company's president Deborah Forte explained that adapting the books into an animated TV show was an opportunity to help kids "learn about science in a fun way". During this time, Forte had been hearing concerns from parents and teachers about how to improve science education for kids and minorities all across the globe. Hanho Heung-Up Co., Ltd. contributed some of the animation for this program. The theme song, called "Ride on the Magic School Bus", was written by Peter Lurye and performed by Little Richard. The voice directors was Susan Blu and Dan Hennessey in Season 4; two of the writers for the series were Brian Meehl and Jocelyn Stevenson.

== Broadcast ==
In the United States, the original run of The Magic School Bus was broadcast on PBS from Sunday September 11, 1994 until Monday December 8, 1997 (as part of its daytime and weekday children's block). It was the first fully-animated series to be aired on PBS. The last episode aired on Monday December 8, 1997. By the series' end, it was among the highest-rated PBS shows for school-age children. After the final episode, the series subsequently continued in reruns on the PBS lineup until Friday September 25, 1998, when PBS dropped the show altogether to make room for other new programs aimed at preschoolers.

Reruns aired on Canada’s Teletoon’s daytime block from 1997 until 2003.

On Monday December 15, 1997, Fox network acquired the series to fill educational television mandates for Fox affiliates. The show was then broadcast on the Fox Kids block, where reruns aired from Monday October 5, 1998 (10 days after the reruns ended on PBS), until Friday September 6, 2002.

After the Fox Kids original run, PBS original run, and Fox Kids reruns, TLC, Discovery Kids, and Qubo chose to air the series. TLC aired it from Monday February 24, 2003 until 2010. Discovery Kids aired it from Monday February 24, 2003 until 2010, as part of the Ready Set Learn! block. Qubo aired it from Monday September 27, 2010 until Sunday February 12, 2012.

Finally, in 2005, Canada-based studio Nelvana Limited acquired the series and sold it to the Latin American versions of Cartoon Network and Nickelodeon (which continues to air on select Nickelodeon and Cartoon Network stations—in Latin America—since 2005). As of 2021, the show is currently distributed by 9 Story Media Group.

== Home media ==
The series (through home media) was released on VHS from 1995 to 2002, DVD from 2002 to 2013, DVD (by New Video Group) in Region 1 (which are the rereleases of the Warner Home Video DVDs) on Tuesday July 31, 2012, and Netflix on Thursday August 15, 2013.

The series was originally released on VHS. The series on VHS was distributed by KidVision in 1995 and Warner Home Video between 1997 and 2002. On DVD, it was distributed by Warner Home Video between 2002 and 2005.

On July 31, 2012, New Video Group released the complete series on DVD in Region 1, as well as rereleases of the Warner Home Video DVDs.

On August 15, 2013, Scholastic announced the complete series' availability on Netflix. Currently however only season 1 of the series is available to stream on Netflix. But the full series is available to stream on Peacock, Amazon Prime Video (as well as for purchase), Paramount+ (added on July 1, 2026) and for free on Tubi (added in July 2024), and The Roku Channel (added in September 2024).

In October 2024, Scholastic started uploading full episodes of the series to their official The Magic School Bus channel on YouTube, as well as the Scholastic Classic and Scholastic After School channels.

== Reception ==
=== Critical response ===
In a 2007 column for the online edition of The Wall Street Journal, Jason Fry expressed an overall appreciation for the series, but wrote that the episode "The Magic School Bus Gets Programmed" illustrated the rapid pace of technological change over the ten years since it first aired. He explained the episode presented an old-fashioned "technology-gone-amok" story about the respective roles of programmer and machine that was no longer relevant to children growing up in 2007. He suggested that an updated version of the episode would have focused instead on the perils of Internet searches and on network concepts surfacing at the time.

=== Effect on science education ===
Both the book series and the television series have been used as tools in classrooms since their original releases. Several studies have suggested that the Magic School Bus's inclusion of fantastical elements helps students understand the basics of a concept before introducing them to more complicated vocabulary and images. The book series was originally created to serve as a tool for kids to learn about and get interested in science while also providing entertainment. Becoming a classroom tool has allowed The Magic School Bus to continue to be a relevant piece of educational media that has allowed teachers to better explain and introduce science to young children as intended when it was originally published by Joanna Cole.

Additionally, many scientists today credit early exposure to The Magic School Bus and other programs on PBS geared towards science education as a reason that they chose their respective fields later in life. Because of this widespread effect, it has become the subject for further studies on its impact on early childhood development in regards to science education.

=== Awards and nominations ===
| Year | Award | Category | Nominee | Result | Ref |
|---|---|---|---|---|---|
| 1995 | Daytime Emmy Award | Outstanding Graphics and Title Design | | Nominated | |
| 1995 | Daytime Emmy Award | Outstanding Performer in an Animated Program | Lily Tomlin as Ms. Frizzle | Won | |
| 1995 | USA Environmental Media Award | Children's Animated Program | | Nominated | |
| 1995 | Grammy Award | Best Spoken Word Album for Children | Fun with Sound: John Wynne, producer | Nominated | |
1996
| 1996 | NCLR Bravo Award | Outstanding Program for Children or Youth | | Nominated | |
| 1996 | Daytime Emmy Award | Outstanding Children's Animated Program | | Nominated | |
| 1996 | Daytime Emmy Award | Outstanding Hairstyling | Milton Buras (for episode "Halloween Special" | Nominated | |
| 1996 | Daytime Emmy Award | Outstanding Performer in an Animated Program | Lily Tomlin as Ms. Frizzle | Nominated | |
| 1997 | Television Critics Association Award | Outstanding Achievement in Children's Programming | | Nominated | |
| 1997 | Daytime Emmy Award | Outstanding Performer in an Animated Program | Lily Tomlin as Ms. Frizzle | Nominated | |
| 1997 | Daytime Emmy Award | Outstanding Children's Animated Program | | Nominated | |
| 1998 | ALMA Award | Outstanding Program for Children or Youth | | Nominated | |
| 1998 | Daytime Emmy Award | Outstanding Performer in an Animated Program | Lily Tomlin as Ms. Frizzle | Nominated | |
| 1998 | Daytime Emmy Award | Outstanding Children's Animated Program | | Nominated | |

== Games ==
Numerous computer and video games associated with the series were released from 1994 to 2000, and were typically amalgamations of storylines from both the original book series and the television show. The games were published by Microsoft Home.

A video game titled The Magic School Bus: Oceans was released for Nintendo DS on October 25, 2011, ten years after the release of the last game. This is the only game in the franchise to be released on a Nintendo platform.

== Revival series ==
On June 10, 2014, a new series was announced by Netflix and Scholastic Media titled The Magic School Bus 360°. The new iteration of the franchise features a modernized Ms. Frizzle and high-tech bus that stresses modern inventions such as robotics, wearables and camera technology. The producers hoped to captivate children's imaginations and motivate their interest in the sciences. 9 Story Media Group would produce the series. Producer Stuart Stone, who voiced Ralphie in the original series, explained that The Magic School Bus 360° would feature some of the original voice actors in different roles. The series' voice cast is based in Los Angeles and Toronto with Susan Blu as the Los Angeles voice director and Alyson Court as the Toronto voice director.

In February 2017, Netflix announced that Saturday Night Live cast member Kate McKinnon was cast in the role of Fiona Felicity Frizzle, the younger sister of Ms. Frizzle, now Professor Frizzle, again voiced by Lily Tomlin. By this point the title of the series had been changed to The Magic School Bus Rides Again. Lin-Manuel Miranda performed the theme song. On September 29, 2017, the series premiered on Netflix.

== Preschool spin-off ==
On October 17, 2024, it was announced that a CG-animated Magic School Bus spin-off titled The Magic School Bus: Mighty Explorers is currently in the works. Mighty Explorers would be geared more towards a preschool audience, and its version of the titular Magic School Bus would speak.
