= The Magic School Bus In the Time of the Dinosaurs =

1994 book by Joanna Cole

- Author: Joanna Cole
- Illustrator: Bruce Degen
- Language: English
- Series: The Magic School Bus
- Genre: Educational fiction
- Publisher: Scholastic Corporation
- Publication date: September 8, 1994
- Publication place: United States
- Media type: Print (Hardback & Paperback) also Audio book
- Pages: 40
- ISBN: 0-590-44689-4
- OCLC: 33156881
- Preceded by: The Magic School Bus on the Ocean Floor
- Followed by: The Magic School Bus Inside a Hurricane

The Magic School Bus In the Time of the Dinosaurs is the sixth book in Joanna Cole and Bruce Degen's The Magic School Bus series, published September 8, 1994.

== Synopsis ==
The kids are transforming their classroom into Dinosaur Land for Parents Night, as they are studying dinosaurs. Ms Frizzle then gets a letter from an old high school friend who is now a paleontologist and she decides to take the class on a trip to the dig. When she discovers that they are missing the bones of some Maiasaurs, she turns the bus into a time machine to travel back to the age of dinosaurs to find the bones. The class sees dinosaurs and learns the name of the different periods of the era and other information.

== Notes ==
- This book is the first time Ms. Frizzle's first name is mentioned.
- This is the first appearance of Keesha and Carlos in the original series books; the TV series debuting the same year this book was released.
- The book seems to feature a predestination paradox. In the present, the palaeontologists find Maiasaura bones, but have difficulty finding their nests. An astute reader will notice that the Maiasaura were apparently separated from their nests because of the Troodon pack the class inadvertently led to their nesting grounds.

== Television adaptation ==
The episode's main aim was to show that dinosaurs weren't all terrifying monsters, like movies often make them out to be. This episode is loosely the television adaptation of The Magic School Bus In the Time of the Dinosaurs (from the book series). The book shows all the time periods but the television adaptation shows just the Cretaceous period. All three time periods (Triassic, Jurassic, and Cretaceous) were seen in the book. Unlike in the book (which focuses with all the time periods), the cartoon adaptation only focuses with the Cretaceous. This version shows only the Cretaceous because it was due to time constraints. Time constraints forced this version to show only that period in order for the episode (The Busasaurus) in the TV series to be up to 30 minutes (like all other episodes).

In this episode, the kids visit Ms. Frizzle's old friend, Dr. Carmina Skeledon at a dinosaur dig, as opposed to Jeff in the book. Dr. Skeledon lets Arnold see a fossilized dinosaur egg that Ms. Frizzle finds as the kids are leaving, and he still has it when they go back in time. The kids watch as they entered the Ice Age and finally end in the Cretaceous. Having gone back "67 million years, give or take a month or two", as Ms. Frizzle tells them, the kids are frightened away by the appearance of large, long necked dinosaurs called Alamosaurus, a titanosaur.

They separated and scattered, Arnold running to Phoebe and Liz. He trips on a rock, and the egg went flying, Liz catching it in time. Arnold lets Phoebe see the egg, but an Ornithomimus steals it from her. Arnold runs after the dinosaur, yelling "That egg doesn't belong to you! Come to think of it...it doesn't belong to me either!". Phoebe runs after him, Liz quickly running to tell Ms. Frizzle.

The rest of the class and Ms. Frizzle re-group, Liz explaining that Arnold and Phoebe ran off. Carlos, being paranoid about getting eaten by dinosaurs exclaims, "I knew this would happen! The dinos did them in!" The class hides out on a river bank, looking out for Arnold and Phoebe, and Ralphie spots them. They cross a herd of Parasaurolophus (where the Bus takes form of a Parasaurolophus) and land in an Edmontosaurus nest. The class continues on their way, only to find themselves with a Triceratops herd in a field. The Bus then takes form of a Triceratops. A pack of carnivorous Troodon chase a baby Triceratops, and the smaller Troodon are scared off by the larger Triceratops. While most of the dinosaurs encountered on the field trip were herbivores (plant eating dinosaurs) including Alamosaurus, Parasaurolophus, and Edmontosaurus, Troodon was a carnivore. At that, Dorothy Ann sees them and takes note that the Troodon eat meat indeed.

Meanwhile, Arnold and Phoebe chase the Ornithomimus. It sniffs the air, and it drops the egg when it realizes a sleeping Tyrannosaurus rex is nearby. Like the Troodon, the Tyrannosaurus also eats meat. Arnold and Phoebe are unaware, and as they look, Arnold finds the egg near a large "rock". Phoebe helps him pull it free saying, "Something tells me we shouldn't be here". As Arnold asks, "Like what?", they wake the tyrant king and Phoebe exclaims, "Like that!" The two run as the Tyrannosaurus chases them, and they find themselves in the same field as the class. Arnold trips into a mud puddle, losing the egg, and he hides under the bus as Phoebe runs back on. Ms. Frizzle grows Arnold as the Tyrannosaurus attacks the bus, and he scares it away, the class learning that the carnivore only wanted "an easy meal without a fight". In the future, back at the fossil dig site (and before going back to school), they find a fossilized sneaker footprint. It's a fossilized footprint from a sneaker; which was caused by giant Arnold's sneaker (from their time travel to after he fought the Tyrannosaurus; which made Arnold leave the sneaker footprint from his shoe due to his giant size). When Ms. Frizzle says she wonders what giant creature left that footprint, Carlos jokes: "I'd say it was a 'Sneakersaurus'!".

=== Notes ===
- Dinosaurs featured:
  - Alamosaurus: Plants
  - Parasaurolophus: Plants
  - Edmontosaurus: Plants
  - Ornithomimus: Meat and plants
  - Triceratops: Plants
  - Troodon: Meat (Meat and plants in real life)
  - Tyrannosaurus rex: Meat
- First and only time travel field trip.
- Arnold acts courageously, rather than being unsteady and cowardly as he is normally portrayed.
- Phoebe does not say "At my old school...". Instead, she somewhat uses Arnold's catchphrase and says, "It's a good thing you didn't stay home today, Arnold". Arnold (about the fossilized egg and when he gets it back to a fossil again) replies, "Well, I should be glad when this egg is a rock again. It's a lot safer".
- In the Parasaurolophus scene, the "screen" behind the crest of the dinosaur changed color.
- The Troodon were shown walking flat-footed.
- The Troodon was shown without a sickle claw.
- The Ornithomimus and Troodon don't have any feathers, as was commonly thought in research at the time of writing.
- Dr. Skeledon was played by Rita Moreno, with whom Tomlin shared the role of Violet Newstead from Nine to Five. Tomlin played Newstead in the original movie while Moreno played her in the subsequent TV series.
- Ornithomimus was more likely to be an omnivore than a true carnivore. So was Troodon. Ornithomimus was also most likely not an egg thief (as depicted in the episode). It was an omnivore and ate both meat and plants.
- Throughout the episode, the egg is shown being tossed around wildly at different points. Dinosaurs didn't turn their eggs like birds today. Because the embryo inside would have died.
- Edmontosaurus is seen but not identified.

== Software adaptation ==
The Magic School Bus Explores In the Age of Dinosaurs
- Developer: Microsoft Home
- Publisher: Microsoft
- Series: The Magic School Bus
- Platforms: PC (Windows, Macintosh)
- Release: December 19, 1996
- Genre: Educational
- Modes: Single-player, multiplayer

Ms. Frizzle is missing three photographs of prehistoric animals from her photo album of her last trip to the age of dinosaurs. As usual, the user has to find replacements. There are seven different places, including "Triassic Arizona", "Triassic Argentina", "Jurassic Colorado", "Jurassic Tethys Sea", "Jurassic Tanzania", "Cretaceous Alberta", and "Cretaceous Mongolia". Like in the book adaptation, the software version shows all the time periods. When all three photos are found, in the end, the Friz awards the player with a mask of a prehistoric animal to print and cut out.

This game in the original software series is loosely the software adaptation of The Magic School Bus In the Time of the Dinosaurs from the book series (and The Magic School Bus The Busasaurus; the cartoon version of said book). Unlike in the two adaptations (the book and TV adaptation) where the Bus transforms into a time machine, the Bus in the software adaptation does not transform into a time machine. In this version, the Bus instead transforms into three different prehistoric animals (one for each of the time periods). The prehistoric animals (prehistoric reptiles) it transforms into are Coelophysis (for the Triassic Period), Stegosaurus (for the Jurassic Period), and Pteranodon (for the Cretaceous Period). The cover however shows the bus in form of a time machine (as depicted/compared to the other two adaptations; book and episode). But in this version (despite the cover for the software), the Bus is animal mecha and transforms into two dinosaurs and one pterosaur (Coelophysis, Stegosaurus, and Pteranodon). However, compared to the TV adaptation (The Busasaurus), in The Busasaurus, the Bus was also animal mecha. Because since the other version (the TV adaptation) only showed the Cretaceous period, the Bus transformed into two prehistoric animals. The dinosaurs it turned into were a Parasaurolophus and Triceratops (and those dinosaurs both lived in the Cretaceous).

This game has very elaborate CGI forms for the bus. Although the classroom location song has changed in the following games, the game's classroom location song is the same as The Magic School Bus Explores Inside the Earth, but had added more rhythm in between. The classroom theme song in this game was re-used in the following game, The Magic School Bus Explores the Rainforest. This game (The Magic School Bus Explores in the Age of Dinosaurs) is also the last game in the original software which is based with any books from the book series. In the next game after this one (The Magic School Bus Explores the Rainforest), this game is based with the TV episode The Magic School Bus In the Rainforest but not with any books (book series or TV tie in books). The last two games (The Magic School Bus Explores the World of Animals and The Magic School Bus Explores the Rainforest) are not based with any adaptation.
