= Commander Toad =

Series of children's books by Jane Yolen

- The first novel in the series, Commander Toad in Space
- Author: Jane Yolen
- Publisher: Puffin Books
- No. of books: 7

Commander Toad is a series of children's books by Jane Yolen, published by Puffin Books from 1980 to 1998. The series is a toad-themed parody of pop culture science fiction filled with puns. Star Wars is referenced with many puns on iconic Star Wars characters including Jake Skyjumper (Luke Skywalker), Deep Wader (Darth Vader) and Star Warts, the name of Commander Toad's ship. The books feature Commander Toad and his crew exploring the Galaxy for Starfleet, and each story is a different mission, a clear reference to Star Trek.

In 1993, the first book was adapted into an ABC Weekend Special produced by Churchill Films. The special used puppets and it featured the voices of Mark Hamill as the Admiral and Nichelle Nichols as SS Stella.

== Books ==
- Commander Toad in Space (1980)
- Commander Toad and the Planet of the Grapes (1982)
- Commander Toad and the Big Black Hole (1983)
- Commander Toad and the Dis-asteroid (1985)
- Commander Toad and the Intergalactic Spy (1986)
- Commander Toad and the Space Pirates (1987)
- Commander Toad and the Voyage Home (1998)
