= The Magic School Bus =

American edutainment media franchise

- Book series logo
- Created by: Joanna Cole and Bruce Degen
- Owner: Scholastic Corporation
- Years: 1986–present

Print publications
- Book(s): The Magic School Bus book series (1986–2021); Specific books include: At the Waterworks (1986); Lost in the Solar System (1990); In the Time of the Dinosaurs (1994)

Films and television
- Animated series: The Magic School Bus (1994–1997); The Magic School Bus Rides Again (2017–2021); The Magic School Bus: Mighty Explorers (TBA)

Games
- Video game(s): The Magic School Bus video game series (1994–2001)

The Magic School Bus is an American edutainment media franchise which includes a book series, TV adaptations, a streaming series, and various video games. Each of the stories within the franchise focuses on the antics of the fictional elementary school teacher, Ms. Valerie Frizzle, and her class (with Carlos, Keesha, Phoebe, Arnold, Tim, Ralphie, Dorothy Ann, and Wanda) who board a "magic school bus", which takes them on field trips to unusual times and locations, such as the Cretaceous Period, outer space, and inside a human body.

== History ==
The first medium that was developed from this franchise was the Magic School Bus book series. Craig Walker, vice-president and senior editorial director at Scholastic Co., stated that the concept began with the idea of combining science with fictional stories, and Joanna Cole (who had written both science and humor before) and Bruce Degen were then approached with creating such a series. Walker also explains that his own memories of school field trips and of a teacher he had once, served as further inspiration. The first book, The Magic School Bus at the Waterworks, was published in 1986.

Cole and Degen started a new series called Ms. Frizzle's Adventures in 2001, which teaches social studies, eventually producing three books in that series. Microsoft Home began publishing Magic School Bus software in 1994, the same year The Magic School Bus concept was also adapted into an animated television series of the same name by Scholastic Entertainment along Canadian animation studio Nelvana. The series premiered on PBS in September 10, 1994 as the network's first series with complete animation, with musician Little Richard performing its theme song. In 1997, The Magic School Bus was picked up by Fox Kids Network to become part of their after-school block. The Network's after-school block had been criticized for the lack of educational values, and The Magic School Bus was seen as a positive sign of a pivot towards educational programming.

Scholastic Entertainment president Deborah Forte says that adapting the books into an animated series was an opportunity to help kids "learn about science in a fun way". Around that time, Forte had been hearing concern from parents and teachers about how to improve science education for girls and minorities. As noted by Marcel LaFollette, "accomplished women were exceptions in a universe of male luminaries" when it came to science television. Ms. Valerie Frizzle, the magic school teacher, was the closest approximation to an expert female host. She was voiced by Lily Tomlin in the series.

The series was followed by another animated series, The Magic School Bus Rides Again, which premiered on Netflix in 2017. Scholastic announced a newer series geared towards preschool age viewers that would feature a CGI version of the Magic School Bus, named Albie in the series, along with Ms. Frizzle, Liz, and a new group of 6 year-old children named Lily, Wyatt and Benny.

Scholastic Entertainment, the American Meteorological Society and Texan Children's Museum of Houston created Scholastic's the Magic School Bus Kicks Up a Storm, a 2,600 sq ft (240 m^{2}) traveling exhibit funded in part by the National Science Foundation, which premiered at the Children's Museum of Houston in 2003 (a copy of it opened in New Jersey the month after that).

In June 2020, a live-action/animated film adaptation of the franchise was announced with Elizabeth Banks cast as Ms. Frizzle. Banks was to produce the film alongside directors Tom McGrath and Eric Darnell. The project later got stuck in development hell until it was revived in 2026 with Rob Letterman serving as writer and director and Banks still attached to play Ms. Frizzle.

== Educational impact ==
The Magic School Bus was one of many shows funded by the National Science Foundation, whose criteria for funding required creators to gain the interest of learners, ensure proper engagement, and impact their education. Their creations necessitated innovation, as that is the driving force of funds, with which The Magic School Bus could promote science, inspire future interests and draw children towards its stories and nature. For educators, the Magic School Bus franchise provided resources and curricula that combined science education with entertainment. The accessibility of the concepts within its lessons makes it easier for young minds to absorb information, so it is used to enhance science education.
