= Bruce Degen =

American writer (1945–2024)

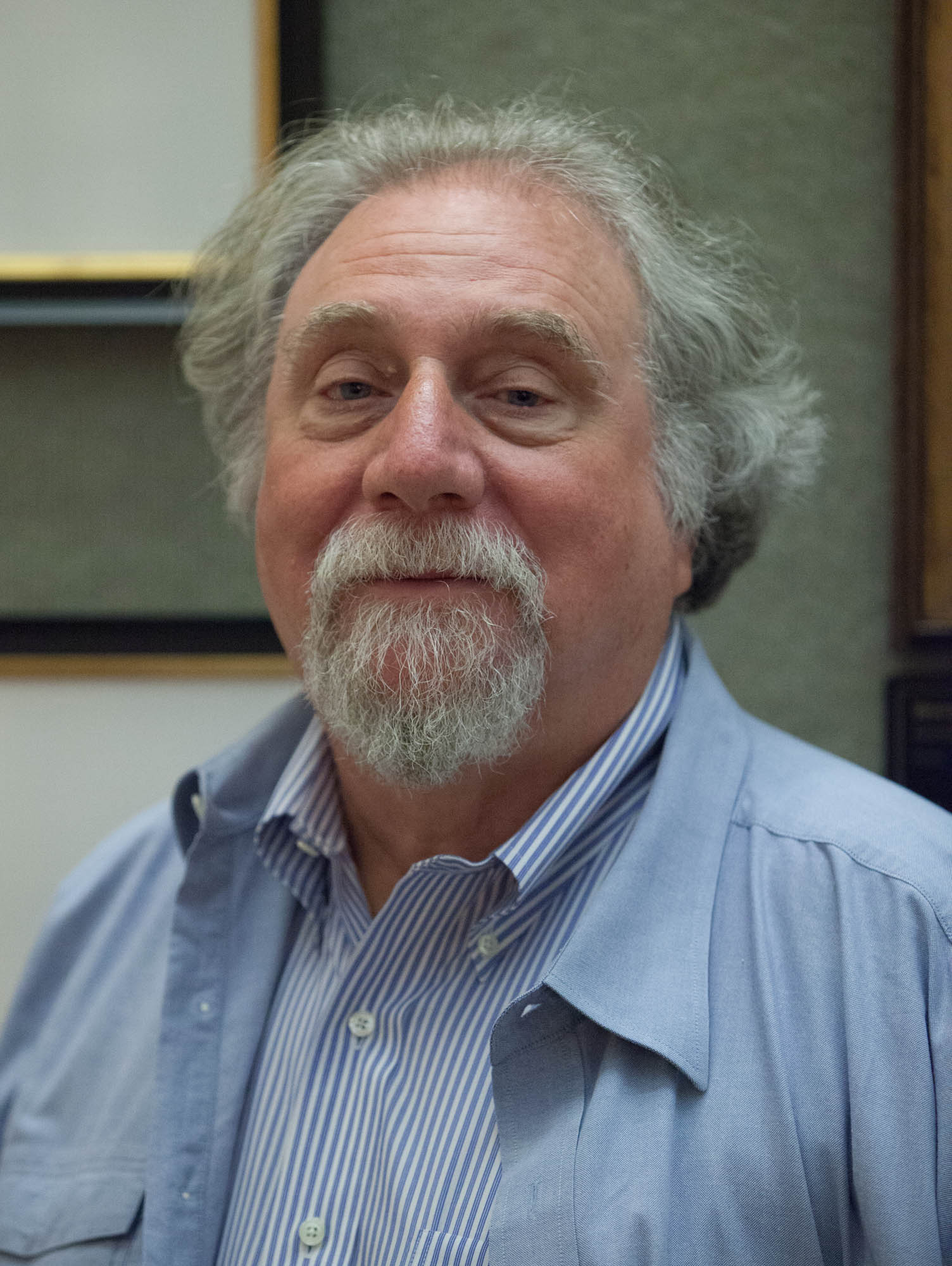
- Degen in 2012
- Born: June 14, 1945; Brooklyn, New York, U.S.
- Died: November 7, 2024 (aged 79); Newtown, Connecticut, U.S.
- Education: Cooper Union (BFA); Pratt Institute (MFA)
- Known for: Illustration
- Notable work: Jamberry, The Magic School Bus series, Jesse Bear series, Commander Toad series, Daddy Is a Doodlebug, Shirley's Wonderful Baby
- Spouse: Christine
- Children: 2, including Benjamin Degen

Bruce Degen (/ˈdiːɡən/ DEEG-ən; June 14, 1945 – November 7, 2024) was an American illustrator and writer, known for illustrating The Magic School Bus, a picture book series written by Joanna Cole. He collaborated with writers Nancy White Carlstrom, on the Jesse Bear books, and Jane Yolen, on the Commander Toad series. He wrote self-illustrated Jamberry, Daddy Is a Doodlebug, and I Gotta Draw.

== Background ==
Degen was born on June 14, 1945, in Brownsville, Brooklyn, where he was raised. His youth was marked by the contrast between urban New York City and the summertimes he spent in rural upstate New York, where he would pick wild berries. He credits those experiences as the inspiration for Jamberry (1983).

He attended elementary school in Brooklyn; one of the teachers let him paint during lessons. He went on to attend art schools in Manhattan, including LaGuardia High School, where a teacher encouraged him to study at Cooper Union. He received his Bachelor of Fine Arts degree at Cooper Union. He then attended Pratt Institute in Brooklyn where he obtained a Masters of Fine Arts degree in printmaking and painting.

Degen married Christine Bostard in 1968. Degen lived in Brooklyn Heights with his family until 1990. Afterwards, he lived in Newtown, Connecticut with his wife and their two sons, Benjamin and Alexander. Benjamin Degen is a painter and Alex Degen is an illustrator, who works on comic books and games such as Anthology of the Killer.

Degen died of pancreatic cancer in Newtown, on November 7, 2024, at the age of 79.

== Career ==
Degen's working life has included designing advertisements, teaching art, making prints, painting scenery for opera productions, and directing a lithography studio in Israel.

From the 1960s to the late 1980s, Degen taught art in public schools of New York City and worked as a freelance artist and illustrator on the side. He began making children's books in 1975; his first was Aunt Possum and the Pumpkin Man. He subsequently illustrated and wrote many children's books, both on his own and with others. He wrote self-illustrated books such as Jamberry (in print since 1983), Daddy Is a Doodlebug (2000) and I Gotta Draw (2012). He illustrated Jane Yolen's Commander Toad series, beginning with Commander Toad and the Planet of the Grapes in 1982 ("an early success" of his career), and Nancy White Carlstrom's Jesse Bear series, beginning with Jesse Bear, What Will You Wear? in 1986.

In the mid-1980s, he became the illustrator for The Magic School Bus book series written by Joanna Cole. The first book, The Magic School Bus at the Waterworks, came out in 1986. The success of the series allowed him to become a full-time artist and "to teach at colleges for fun." The book series sold over 95 million copies and became a franchise with many adaptations, such as the 1994–1997 TV series. Degen and Cole made 14 books together over a few decades of collaboration. Their last was The Magic School Bus Explores Human Evolution; Cole died in 2020.

== Patronage ==
Bruce and Christine Degen are Lifetime Giving Society members at the Cooper Union.

Bruce and Christine Degen contributed "Gifts to the Garden" for the Brooklyn Botanic Gardens.

They sat as appointed members of the Newtown, Connecticut, Hattertown Historic District Commission.

== Selected works ==
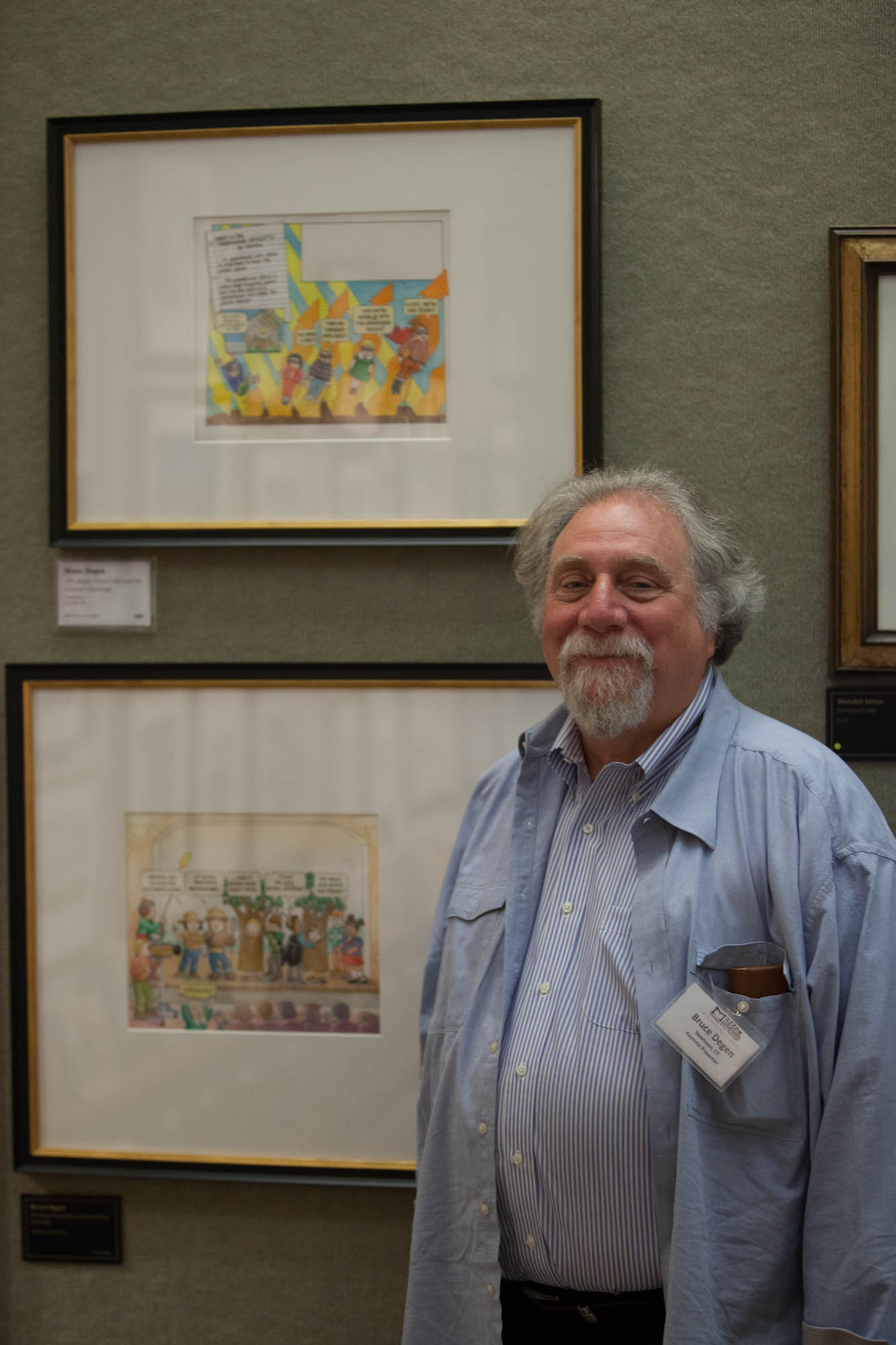
Degen poses in front of two of his artworks on display in the Mazza Museum.

Credited authors are the writers of books illustrated by Degen.

- Aunt Possum and the Pumpkin Man (1977)
- Forecast by Malcolm Hall (1977; 1st UK edition published by World's Work, 1979).
- A Big Day for Scepters by Stephen Krensky (1977)
- Ig Lives in a Cave by Carol Chapman (1979)
- Brimhall Turns to Magic by Judy Delton (1979)
- Mr. Jameson and Mr. Phillips by Marjorie W. Sharmat (1979)
- Commander Toad series, written by Jane Yolen (1980–1997)
- My Mother Didn't Kiss Me Good-Night by Charlotte Herman (1980)
- The Little Witch and the Riddle (1980)
- Little Chick's Big Day by Mary DeBall Kwitz (1981)
- Dandelion Hill by Clyde Robert Bulla (1982)
- Upchuck Summer by Joel L. Schwartz (1982)
- Jamberry (1983)
- Little Chick's Breakfast by Mary DeBall Kwitz (1983)
- Daddy's Coming Home! by Lyn Littlefield Hoopes (1984)
- Lonely Lula Cat by Joseph Slate (1985)
- Grandpa Bear by Bonnie Pryor (1985)
- Best Friends Don't Come in Threes by Joel L. Schwartz (1985)
- Jesse Bear series, written by Nancy White Carlstrom (1986–2012)
- The Josefina Story Quilt by Eleanor Coerr (1986)
- The Good-Luck Pencil by Diane Stanley (1986)
- Grandpa Bear's Christmas by Bonnie Pryor (1986)
- The Magic School Bus series, written by Joanna Cole (1986–2020)
- The Forgetful Bears Meet Mr. Memory by Larry Weinberg (1987)
- If You Were a Writer by Joan Lowery Nixon (1988)
- Tim Kitten and the Red Cupboard by Jan Wahl (1988)
- The Forgetful Bears Help Santa by Larry Weinberg (1988)
- Lion and Lamb by William H. Hooks and Barbara Brenner (1989)
- Dinosaur Dances by Jane Yolen (1990)
- Lion and Lamb Step Out by William H. Hooks and Barbara Brenner (1990)
- Teddy Bear Towers (1991)
- Goblin Walk by Tony Johnston (1991)
- Ups and Downs with Lion and Lamb by William H. Hooks and Barbara Brenner (1991)
- Little Chick's Friend, Duckling by Mary DeBall Kwitz (1992)
- Mouse's Birthday by Jane Yolen (1993)
- A Beautiful Feast for a Big King Cat by John Archambault (1994)
- Will You Give Me a Dream? by Joan Lowery Nixon (1994)
- Sailaway Home (1996)
- Shirley's Wonderful Baby by Valiska Gregory (1999)
- Daddy Is a Doodlebug (2000) ISBN 0-06-443578-4
- I Gotta Draw (2012)
- I Said, "Bed!" (2014)
- Snow Joke (2014)
- Nate Likes to Skate (2016)
