= Joanna Cole (author) =

American author (1944–2020)

- Born: Joanna Reid Basilea; August 11, 1944 Newark, New Jersey, U.S.
- Died: July 12, 2020 (aged 75) Sioux City, Iowa, U.S.
- Occupation: Author; librarian
- Education: City College of New York
- Notable works: The Magic School Bus

Joanna Cole (August 11, 1944 – July 12, 2020) was an American author of children's books, best known as the author of the Magic School Bus series, which is illustrated by Bruce Degen and has sold more than 93 million copies in 13 countries. Cole wrote more than 250 books in total.

== Early life ==
Cole was born in Newark, New Jersey, the daughter of Elizabeth (Reid), a homemaker, and Mario Basilea, a house painter. She grew up in the suburb East Orange. She loved science as a child, and had a teacher that she says acted a little like Ms. Frizzle, but that she did not resemble her physically because her teacher looked "very conservative". Her teacher let students check out one of her science books each week and Cole stated, "I thought that reading science books for pleasure was an ordinary thing". As a child, she studied insects and plants in her backyard. Cole enjoyed school and also enjoyed writing science reports for class. Her favorite book as a child was titled Bugs, Insects and Such which was a gift from her aunt because Cole liked to watch insects in her backyard.

In 1965, she married Philip A. Cole. She attended the University of Massachusetts and Indiana University before graduating from the City College of New York in 1967 with a B.A. in psychology.

== Career ==
After some graduate education courses, she became a librarian in a Brooklyn elementary school. Cole subsequently became a letters correspondent at Newsweek, then associate editor for the SeeSaw book club at Scholastic, and then a senior editor for Doubleday Books for Young Readers. She went freelance in 1980, writing children's books and articles for Parents magazine. Her first children's book was about cockroaches and it was published in 1971. Cole decided to write Cockroaches because there had not yet been a book published about the insect, and said "I had ample time to study the creature in my low-budget New York apartment!" She decided to write children's books full-time in 1980. Two of her books were written for parents to read with their children, with the titles being How You Were Born (1984) and Your New Potty (1989). Cole always kept the emotional level of her readers in mind when writing children's books. She stated that it is a privilege to have a career doing what she enjoyed as a child.

=== The Magic School Bus ===
The first Magic School Bus book was written in 1985 and published the following year. She and illustrator Bruce Degen spent over a year per book when they worked on the first 10 titles. Cole was nervous about starting the first Magic School Bus book, stating, "I couldn't work at all. I cleaned out closets, answered letters, and went shopping—anything but sit down and write. But eventually I did it, even though I was scared". She also said that she wanted to write science books that told stories which readers would enjoy even with no science aspect.

When writing a Magic School Bus book Cole wrote the text first, then she and Degen went over each page. She also wrote more words on removable tape which she placed over those she had previously written. If she did not like something she had written, she figured that she might like what was on the tape instead.

The Magic School Bus has found continued success and has sold millions of copies in multiple languages. The most recent installment in the series is The Magic School Bus Explores Human Evolution (2020). Cole said that her favorite The Magic School Bus book is Inside the Earth, in which the character Arnold confuses a piece of Styrofoam with dirt on it as a rock and brings it to class, similar to an incident involving Cole's daughter.

The book series was adapted into an animated TV show starring the voice of Lily Tomlin (as "Ms. Frizzle"), which ran for 3 years beginning in 1994. In 2017, the books were adapted for a Netflix series starring the voice of Kate McKinnon (as "Fiona Felicity Frizzle"), titled The Magic School Bus Rides Again.

The video game series was published for several other hardware platforms in 1994 until 2010.

== Reception ==
Most of Cole's books became ALA Notables and received NSTA/CBC Non-fiction Awards. Cole received the Washington Post/Children's Book Guild for her non-fiction children's books in 1971. Her books A Cat's Body and A Bird's Body were selections for the Junior Literary Guild.

A 1988 review in The New York Times of The Magic School Bus Inside the Earth (second book in the series) said:

The author Joanna Cole and the illustrator Bruce Degen have come up with the freshest, most amusing approach to science for children that I've seen...Elementary school science should never be the same again after the Magic School Bus series is completed.

An author spotlight in the book Valerie & Walter's Best Books for Children 2nd Ed: A Lively, Opinionated Guide stated, "If Joanna Cole had contributed nothing to the world of children's books other than her Magic School Bus books, her popularity would still be assured".

Cole's Asking About Sex and Growing Up was named the 57th most challenged book from 1990 to 1999.

== Death ==
Cole died on July 12, 2020, aged 75, of idiopathic pulmonary fibrosis. Her frequent collaborator Stephanie Calmenson wrote a tribute that states: "Losing Joanna, we lose the chance to share Ms. Frizzle’s latest science adventure with children, making them laugh and helping them better understand the world they live in." Until her death, Cole continued to write books on many subjects for a range of ages, and collaborated on many books with Calmenson, including the Ready, Set, Dogs! series and The Adventures of Allie and Amy series.

The four 2020–21 specials that make up the third season of The Magic School Bus Rides Again—"Kids in Space," "The Frizz Connection," "In the Zone," and "Goldstealer"—were all dedicated to her memory.

== Selected works ==
=== Ready, Set, Dogs! series ===
—written with Stephanie Calmenson

- No Dogs Allowed (2014)
- Teacher's Pet (2015)
- Hot Diggity Dogs (2016)

=== The Adventures of Allie and Amy series ===
—written with Stephanie Calmenson

- The Best Friend Plan (2020)
- Rockin' Rockets (2020)
- Stars of the Show (2021)

=== Clown-Arounds series ===
- The Clown-Arounds (1981)
- The Clown-Arounds Have a Party (1982)
- Get Well, Clown-Arounds! (1982)
- The Clown-Arounds Go On Vacation (1983)
- Sweet Dreams, Clown-Arounds! (1985)

=== The Gator Girls series ===
—written with Stephanie Calmenson

- The Gator Girls (1995)
- Rockin' Reptiles (1997)
- Get Well, Gators (1998)
- Gator Halloween (2001)

=== Monster series ===
- Monster Manners (1985)
- Monster Movie (1987)
- Monster Valentines (1990)

=== Other books ===
- Cockroaches (1971)
- My Puppy is Born (1973)
- Plants in Winter (1973)
- A Calf is Born (1975)
- Dinosaur Story (1976)
- A Chick Hatches (1976)
- Fun on Wheels (1977)
- A Fish Hatches (1978)
- A Frog's Body (1980)
- A Horse's Body (1981)
- Golly Gump Swallowed a Fly (1982)
- A Cat's Body (1982)
- A Bird's Body (1982)
- Bony-Legs (1983)
- An Insect's Body (1984)
- A New Treasury of Children's Poetry (1984)
- How You Were Born (1984)
- Night Time Animals: As Large as Life (1985)
- Cuts, Breaks, Bruises and Burns: How Your Body Heals (1985)
- A Dog's Body (1986)
- Hungry, Hungry Sharks! (1986)
- The Laugh Book (1986)
- Doctor Change (1986)
- Cars and How They Go (1986)
- This is the Place for Me (1986)
- The Fox and the Hound: Hide and Seek (1986)
- Norma Jean, Jumping Bean (1987)
- Mixed-Up Magic (1987)
- Hank and Frank Fix Up the House (1988)
- Asking About Sex and Growing Up: A Question-and-Answer Book for Boys and Girls (1988)
- The Read-Aloud Treasury (1988)
- The Missing Tooth (1988)
- Aren't You Forgetting Something, Fiona? (1988)
- A Snake's Body (1989)
- Evolution (1989)
- Anna-Banana: 101 Jump-Rope Rhymes (1989)
- Your New Potty (1989)
- A Gift from Saint Francis: The First Creche (1989)
- It's Too Noisy! (1989)
- Safe from the Start: Your Child's Safety from Birth to Age Five (1989)
- Bully Trouble (1989)
- Animal Sleepyheads: One to Ten (1989)
- Don't Call Me Names! (1990)
- Buster Cat Goes Out (1990)
- Miss Mary Mack and Other Children's Street Rhymes (1990)
- Don't Tell the Whole World! (1990)
- A Scary Book (1991)
- The Eentsy, Weentsy Spider: Fingerplays and Action Rhymes (1991)
- Large as Life Animals (1992)
- Big Goof and Little Goof (1992)
- Pat-a-Cake and Other Play Rhymes (1992)
- Parents Book of Toilet Training (1993)
- Six Sick Sheep: 101 Tongue Twisters (1994)
- Crazy Eights and Other Card Games (1994)
- You Can't Smell a Flower with Your Ear! (1994)
- A Pocketful of Laughs: Stories, Poems, Jokes and Riddles (1995)
- Spider's Lunch: All About Garden Spiders (1995)
- Why Did the Chicken Cross the Road? and Other Riddles, Old and New (1995)
- Who Put the Pepper in the Pot? (1995)
- My New Kitten (1996)
- Monster and Muffin (1996)
- Riding Silver Star (1996)
- Why Does Water Wiggle?: Learning About the World (1997)
- Bug in a Rug: Reading Fun for Just-Beginners (1997)
- Rain or Shine Activity Book: Fun Things to Make and Do (1997)
- Marbles: 101 Ways to Play (1998)
- Rockin' Reptiles (1998)
- Your Insides (1998)
- Get Well, Gators! (1998)
- The New Baby at Your House (1999)
- How I Was Adopted (1999)
- Fun on the Run: Travel Games and Songs (1999)
- More Tons of Fun (1999)
- When You Were Inside Mommy (2001)
- When Mommy and Daddy Go to Work (2001)
- Simply Science (2003)
- Yours Till Banana Splits: 201 Autograph Rhymes (2004)
- Pin the Tail on the Donkey and Other Party Games (2004)
- Sharing is Fun (2004)
- My Big Boy Potty (2004)
- My Big Girl Potty (2004)
- My Friend the Doctor (2005)
- I'm a Big Sister (2010)
- I'm a Big Brother (2010)
