= John Quinn (producer) =

American Producer (born 1958)

- Occupations: Television producer; game show showrunner
- Years active: 2005–present
- Notable work: The Price Is Right; Let's Make a Deal Primetime; Celebrity Name Game; America Says

John Quinn is an American TV producer and game show showrunner. He is best known as the Executive Producer and Showrunner of “The Price Is Right (CBS)” , a position he has held since taking over in 2025.

He is also the executive producer for numerous other game shows across multiple networks, including CBS (Let's Make a Deal), ABC (Press Your Luck and The Greatest Average American), and NBC (Password).

== Early life and education ==
A native of Grand Rapids, Michigan, Quinn attained a BA in Psychology and Theatre from the University of Dayton in 1996 and an MFA in Theatre Directing from DePaul University in 2000.

John currently resides in Los Angeles with his wife Rebecca, their two daughters, and their two dogs. He is a passionate lover of animals, people, and fun.

== Career ==
John Quinn started his career in entertainment directing theatre before making the switch to television in 2001. Quinn has spent the majority of his career working in the game show space. He spent five years as a producer on “Deal or No Deal” before moving up the ranks and producing such shows as “Don’t Forget the Lyrics”, “Million Dollar Money Drop”, “You Deserve It”, “The Choice”, “Perfect Score” and “Take It All”.

Quinn has since gone on to executive produce the Emmy nominated, “Celebrity Name Game” hosted by Emmy winner, Craig Ferguson, “Match Game” hosted by Alec Baldwin, “25 Words or Less” hosted by Meredith Viera and “America Says” hosted by John Michael Higgins.

Currently, Quinn is the executive producer and showrunner of “Press Your Luck (ABC)” hosted by Elizabeth Banks, “Password (NBC)” starring Jimmy Fallon and hosted by Keke Palmer, “The Greatest Average American (ABC)” hosted by Nate Bargatze, “Let’s Make a Deal (CBS)” hosted by Wayne Brady, and “The Price is Right (CBS)” hosted by Drew Carey.

== Filmography ==
=== Television ===
| Year | Title | Role | Notes | Ref. |
|---|---|---|---|---|
| 2025–2026 | The Price Is Right | Showrunner | Seasons 54-55 | |
| 2026 | The Greatest Average American | Showrunner | Season 1 | |
| 2022–2024 | Password | Showrunner | Seasons 1-2 | |
| 2019–2026 | Press Your Luck | Showrunner | Seasons 1-7 | |
| 2019–2026 | Let's Make a Deal | Showrunner | Seasons 11-18 | |
| 2018–2019 | America Says | Executive Producer | Seasons 1-2 | |
| 2018 | 25 Words or Less | Executive Producer | Season 1 | |
| 2018 | Match Game | Executive Producer | Season 3 | |
| 2017 | Snap Decision | Executive Producer | Season 2 | |
| 2015 | Celebrity Food Fight | Executive Producer | Season 1 | |
| 2014–2017 | Celebrity Name Game | Executive Producer, Co-Executive Producer | Seasons 1-3 | |
| 2013 | Perfect Score | Executive Producer | Season 1 | |
| 2012 | Take It All | Co-Executive Producer | Season 1 | |
| 2012 | The Choice | Supervising Producer | Season 1 | |
| 2011 | You Deserve It | Supervising Producer | Season 1 | |
| 2010 | Million Dollar Money Drop | Supervising Producer | Season 1 | |
| 2007 | Don't Forget the Lyrics | Supervising Producer | Seasons 1-2 | |
| 2005–2010 | Deal or No Deal | Supervising Producer, Senior Producer, Producer | Seasons 1-5 | |
| 2010 | Deal or No Deal: Road Trip | Creator, Supervising Producer | Season 1 | |
| 2000 | Street Smarts | Producer | Seasons 3-5 | |
| 1998 | Change of Heart | Associate Producer | Season 4 | |

== Awards and honors ==
| Year | Association | Category | Project | Result | Ref. |
|---|---|---|---|---|---|
| 2026 | Primetime Emmy Award | Outstanding Game Show | The Price Is Right | Nominated | |
| 2025 | Primetime Emmy Award | Outstanding Host for a Game Show | Press Your Luck - Elizabeth Banks | Nominated | |
| 2024 | Primetime Emmy Award | Outstanding Game Show | Password | Nominated | |
| 2024 | Primetime Emmy Award | Outstanding Host for a Game Show | Password – Keke Palmer | Nominated | |
| 2023 | Primetime Emmy Award | Outstanding Host for a Game Show | Password – Keke Palmer | Won | |
| 2022 | Daytime Emmy Award | Outstanding Game Show | Let's Make a Deal | Nominated | |
| 2022 | Daytime Emmy Award | Outstanding Game Show Host | Let's Make a Deal – Wayne Brady | Nominated | |
| 2021 | Daytime Emmy Award | Outstanding Game Show | Let's Make a Deal | Nominated | |
| 2021 | Daytime Emmy Award | Outstanding Game Show Host | Let's Make a Deal – Wayne Brady | Nominated | |
| 2020 | Daytime Emmy Award | Outstanding Game Show Host | Let's Make a Deal – Wayne Brady | Nominated | |
| 2019 | Daytime Emmy Award | Outstanding Game Show Host | Let's Make a Deal – Wayne Brady | Nominated | |
| 2019 | Daytime Emmy Award | Outstanding Game Show | Let's Make a Deal | Nominated | |
| 2017 | Daytime Emmy Award | Outstanding Game Show | Celebrity Name Game | Nominated | |
| 2017 | Daytime Emmy Award | Outstanding Game Show Host | Celebrity Name Game – Craig Ferguson | Nominated | |
| 2016 | Daytime Emmy Award | Outstanding Game Show Host | Celebrity Name Game – Craig Ferguson | Won | |
| 2015 | Daytime Emmy Award | Outstanding Game Show Host | Celebrity Name Game – Craig Ferguson | Won | |
