= Pat Sajak =

American television host (born 1946)

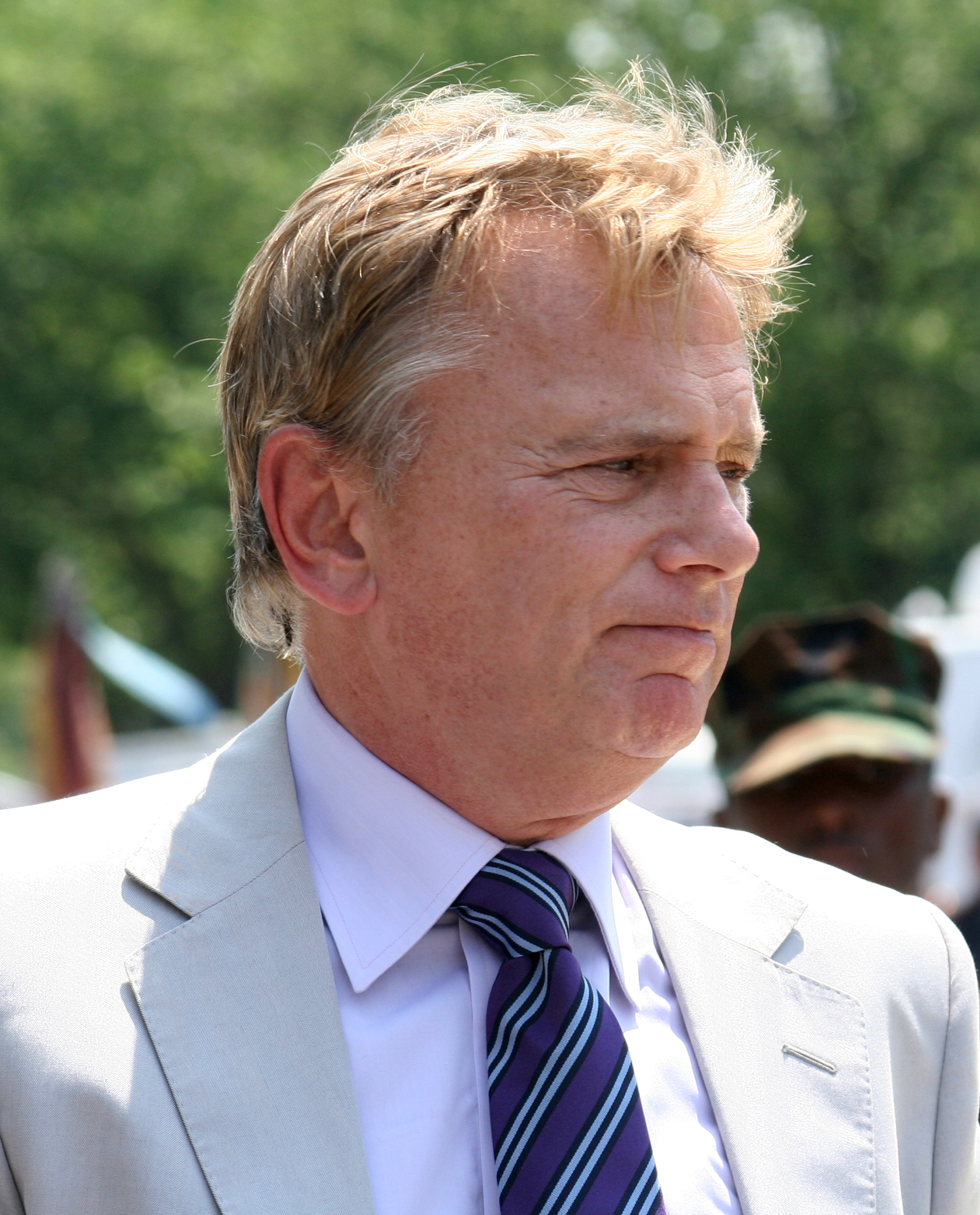
- Sajak in 2011
- Born: Patrick Leonard Sajdak; October 26, 1946 (age 80); Chicago, Illinois, U.S.
- Education: Columbia College Chicago
- Occupations: Television personality; game show host; creative consultant
- Years active: 1968–2025
- Notable credits: Wheel of Fortune (1981–2024); The Pat Sajak Show (1989–1990); Celebrity Wheel of Fortune (2021–2025)
- Political party: Republican
- Spouses: Sherrill Sajak (m. 1979; div. 1986); Lesly Brown (m. 1989)
- Children: 2; including Maggie
- Military career
- Allegiance: United States
- Branch: US Army: American Forces Vietnam Network
- Service years: 1968–1969
- Rank: Specialist 5th Class
- Conflicts: Vietnam War

Patrick Leonard Sajak (/ˈseɪdʒæk/ SAY-jak; né Sajdak /ˈsaɪdæk/; born October 26, 1946) is an American retired game show host, television personality, and creative consultant. He is best known as the host of the television game show Wheel of Fortune, a position which he held from 1981 to 2024. Sajak also served as a consultant for the show, and hosted Celebrity Wheel of Fortune until 2025. For his work on Wheel, Sajak has received 19 nominations for the Daytime Emmy Award for Outstanding Game Show Host, winning thrice, and twice nominated for the Primetime Emmy Award for Outstanding Host for a Game Show, winning in 2024. In 2019, he was recognized by Guinness World Records for having the longest-serving career as a game show host for the same show, surpassing previous record holder Bob Barker.

Beyond his game show career, Sajak also hosted a late-night talk show on CBS from 1989 to 1990 and became a frequent guest host for CNN's Larry King Live and the syndicated Live with Regis and Kelly. He has made various appearances in films, television series, and game shows, such as Airplane II: The Sequel, Days of Our Lives, and Rugrats.

Sajak has been involved in a variety of other endeavors, including as an external director of conservative publishing house Eagle Publishing and writing for the National Review Online and Ricochet.com. He is also the author of several puzzle games, including "Lucky Letters", developed in collaboration with puzzle developer David L. Hoyt.

== Early life ==
Patrick Leonard Sajak was born in Chicago, Illinois, on October 26, 1946. He graduated from Farragut High School in 1964, then went to Columbia College Chicago while working as a desk clerk at The Palmer House Hilton hotel. His Polish-origin surname was originally spelled Sajdak, but he later changed it to Sajak to better reflect its Americanized pronunciation.

Sajak served in the U.S. Army as a disc jockey during the Vietnam War for American Forces Vietnam Network. He hosted the same Dawn Buster radio show that Adrian Cronauer did and Sajak followed Cronauer's tradition of signing on with "Good Morning Vietnam!" for 14 months.

== Career ==
=== Early career ===
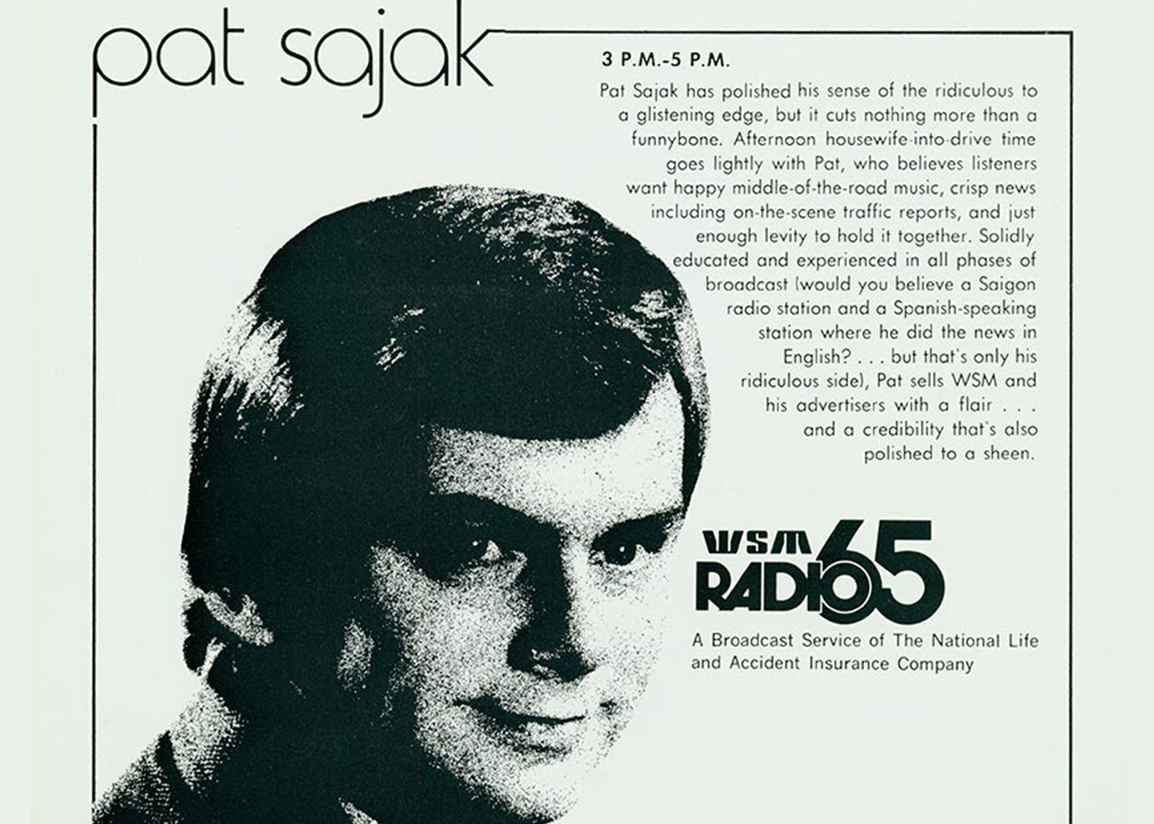
Sajak in an ad for WSM, where he was an afternoon host, c. 1970s

Sajak won a contest on WLS radio's Dick Biondi Show to be a guest teen deejay. While at Columbia College Chicago, his broadcasting instructor Al Parker told him that a local radio station (WEDC) was looking for a newsman. Sajak applied for the job and was hired to work from midnight to 6:00 a.m. In 1968, he joined the U.S. Army and was sent to Vietnam, serving as a disc jockey on Armed Forces Radio. On the Military Channel's program, An Officer and a Movie, Sajak admitted to botching President Richard Nixon's 1969 Christmas broadcast to the troops; he accidentally cut the feed off prematurely. Upon realizing the error, Sajak decided it would be best not to resume the feed. In the early 1970s, he DJed for a year at WNBS in Murray, Kentucky. Also in the early 1970s, Sajak began DJing at 50,000-watt WSM in Nashville; at the time, WSM was playing pop music during the day, and he was the 2:30–5:00 pm afternoon personality. The radio station's television sister, WSM-TV (now WSMV), brought Sajak on screen, first as a voiceover artist making station identifications and anchoring the five-minute newscasts during NBC's Today Show, then as a weekend and substitute weatherman, where he became acquainted with anchor Dan Miller. In 1977, KNBC-TV in Los Angeles was looking for a weather reporter and spotted Sajak working in Nashville. He accepted KNBC's request for him to be a full-time weather reporter for the station.

=== Wheel of Fortune ===
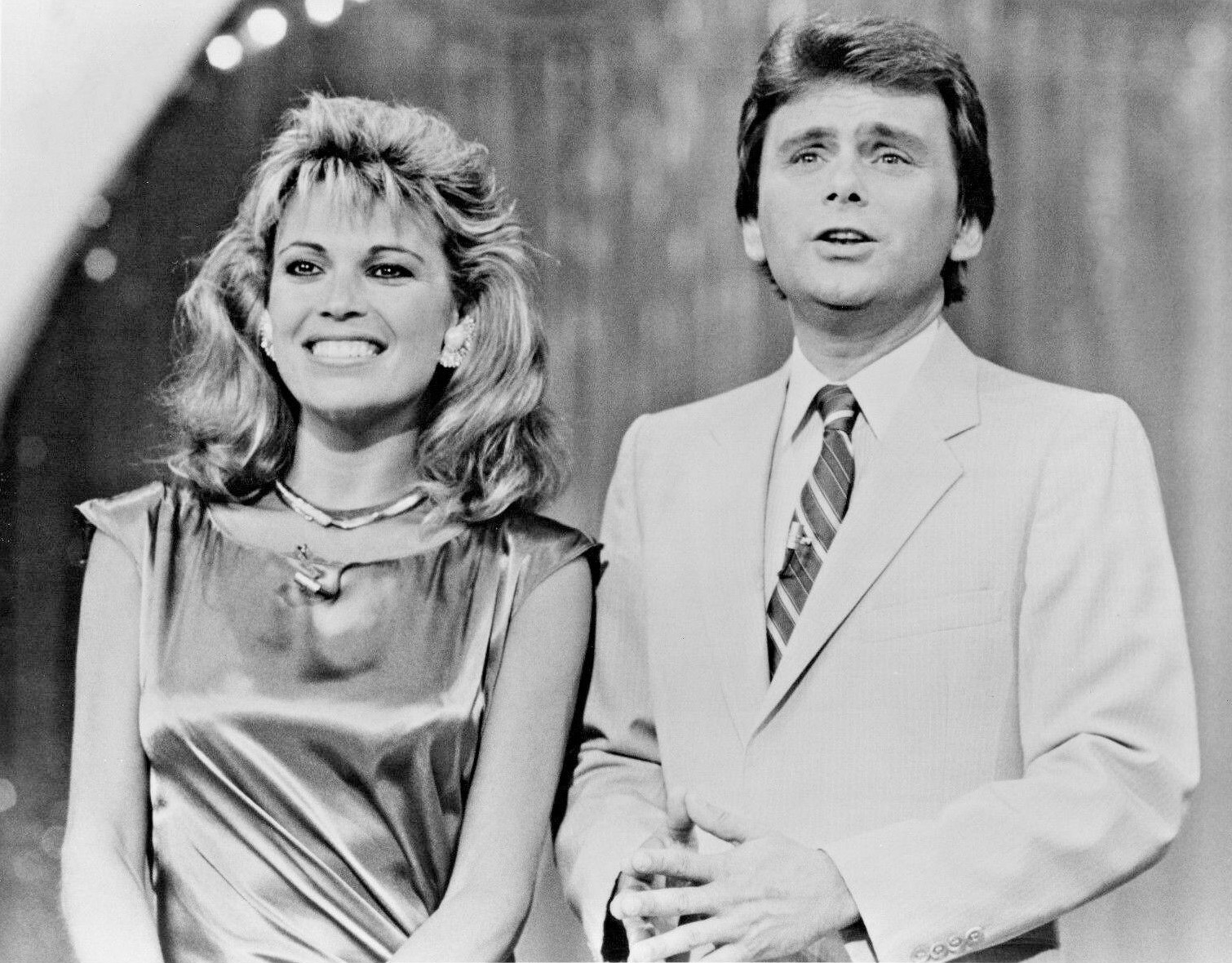
Sajak with Vanna White on Wheel of Fortune, circa 1986

In 1981, Merv Griffin asked Sajak if he would be interested in taking over the duties as host on Wheel of Fortune from Chuck Woolery. However, Fred Silverman, the president and CEO of NBC, rejected his hiring, claiming Sajak was too local, and Griffin responded by imposing a moratorium on new tapings until Sajak was hired. The issue became moot when Silverman was dismissed due to repeated programming failures and replaced by Brandon Tartikoff. Sajak, who had already hosted two game show pilots in 1980, Press Your Luck for Ralph Edwards (no relation to the 1983 CBS game show of the same name) and Puzzlers for Mark Goodson, accepted the position. From 1983 to 1989, Sajak hosted both the daytime (NBC) and syndicated evening versions of Wheel of Fortune; Sajak continued to host the latter version until 2024. When his late-night talk show on CBS premiered in January 1989, Sajak left the daytime version of Wheel and was replaced by former San Diego Chargers place-kicker Rolf Benirschke (who was later replaced by Bob Goen when the daytime show moved to CBS in July of that year). With Sajak returning for his 36th season in 2018–19, he became the longest-running host of any game show, surpassing Bob Barker, who hosted The Price Is Right from 1972 to 2007. From 2020 until his retirement in 2024, Sajak served as the show's consulting producer.

In 1997, Sajak pulled an April Fool's Day prank on fans when he and Vanna White were contestants on an episode of Wheel hosted by Alex Trebek. The winnings of both Sajak and White were donated to charity (in this case, the American Cancer Society and the Boy Scouts of America). In return, Sajak hosted a regular episode of Jeopardy! in place of Trebek. Sajak also appeared at the beginning of a 2010 April Fool's episode, along with Jeff Probst and Neil Patrick Harris.

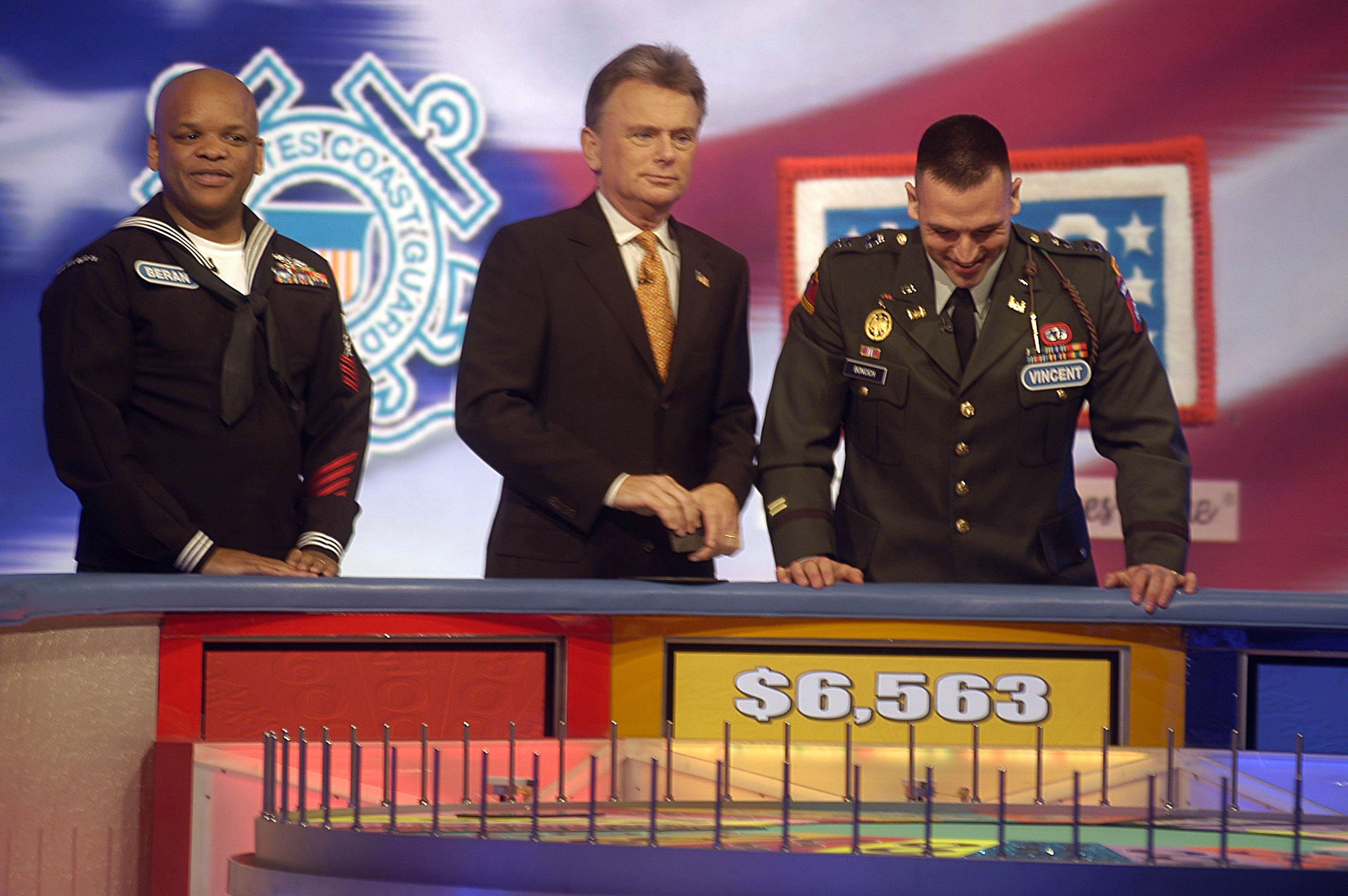
Sajak on Wheel of Fortune in 2006

From 2021 to 2025, Sajak hosted alongside White on the primetime spin-off Celebrity Wheel of Fortune for ABC.

In September 2021, it was announced that both Sajak and White had signed on to continue as hosts of Wheel of Fortune through the 2023–24 season. On June 12, 2023, Sajak announced that he would retire as host of Wheel of Fortune in 2024, after the conclusion of the show's 41st season. Shortly afterwards, media personality Ryan Seacrest was announced as Sajak's successor. His final episode was taped in April 2024 and aired on June 7, 2024. Seacrest's first episode as host aired on September 9, 2024. In June 2023, Sajak agreed to continue as a show consultant for three years after hosting and said he would continue as chairman of the board of trustees for Hillsdale College. His final episode scored 11.03 million viewers, which was the show's highest ratings in four years. It was announced on July 11, 2024, that Sajak would return as the host of Celebrity Wheel of Fortune for its fifth season. The season premiered in December 2024 with the remaining episodes starting to air on April 30, 2025. Sajak's final episode as host aired on June 10, 2025.

=== Media appearances ===
In 1982, Sajak had a small role as a Buffalo, New York, newscaster in the comedy film Airplane II: The Sequel. From 1984 to 1989, Sajak appeared on Super Password several times, as well as Password Plus in 1981, shortly before taking on hosting duties on Wheel. Other game shows on which he appeared as a celebrity guest were Dream House, Just Men!, and Match Game-Hollywood Squares Hour.

From January 9, 1990, to April 13, 1990, Sajak hosted a short-lived late-night talk show on CBS. Dan Miller, Sajak's old friend and former anchor at WSM-TV in Nashville, joined him as his sidekick. Sajak later became a frequent guest host for CNN's Larry King Live when King was unable to do the show. Sajak became a regular substitute host for Regis Philbin on the syndicated Live with Regis and Kelly. Sajak also hosted Pat Sajak Weekend on Fox News in 2003. From at least 2002, Sajak hosted The Pat Sajak Baseball Hour, a syndicated weekly radio sports talk show that ended in 2006 due to scheduling conflicts.

In 1983, Sajak portrayed Kevin Hathaway in the NBC daytime soap opera Days of Our Lives. In 1994, Sajak appeared as himself on the children's cartoon show Rugrats.

In 2001, Sajak appeared as himself in the episode "Inner Tube" on the sitcom The King of Queens.

Sajak has appeared on episodes of ESPN Radio's The Dan Le Batard Show with Stugotz, as well as Le Batard's other show, Highly Questionable.

In 2021, Sajak voiced a singing bust in the Muppets Haunted Mansion television special for Disney+. Sajak has been a frequent celebrity narrator at Disney's Candlelight Processional, appearing most recently in 2017, 2018, 2019, 2021, and 2024.

In the summer of 2025, Sajak starred as Lieutenant Columbo in a stage production of Prescription: Murder, adapted from the pilot episode of the television series Columbo, at the Hawaii Theatre Center in Honolulu, Hawaii, alongside local news anchor Joe Moore. In October 2026, Sajak spoke at Air Supply's Hollywood Walk of Fame ceremony.

=== Other activities ===
Sajak is an external director of conservative publishing house Eagle Publishing. He has been a member of the board of directors for the Claremont Institute.

Sajak is the author of several puzzle games, the first and best-known of them being "Lucky Letters", which debuted in 2007. The games, which Sajak developed with puzzle developer David L. Hoyt, are syndicated through Universal Uclick.

In 2010, Sajak began writing for the National Review Online. In his first post, Sajak questioned whether public employees should be allowed to vote on issues that would benefit them directly. He also has contributed to the center-right sociopolitical/social networking website Ricochet.com.

As of 2019, Sajak is the Hillsdale College board of trustees chair. He was previously vice-chair for 15 years. Hillsdale is a private Christian college.

== Personal life ==
From 1979 to 1986, Sajak was married to Sherrill Sajak, whom he met in 1978. In 1988, Sajak met Lesly Brown-Sajak, a photographer 19 years his junior, through mutual friends; after less than a year of dating, he proposed to her in the summer of 1989 and got married on December 31 of that year. The couple has two children: a son, Patrick Michael James Sajak (born September 22, 1990), who is a doctor, having earned his medical degree in 2021, and a daughter, Maggie Marie Sajak (born January 5, 1995), who is a social correspondent on Wheel of Fortune. Until 2026, the couple has lived in Severna Park, Maryland, with a second home in Los Angeles. Sajak resided in Montana as of 2026.

Sajak is featured as a narrator in a brief film shown at the visitor center at Mount Vernon, the residence of George Washington, where he explains to tourists the attractions of the site. From 1998 until the end of 2021, Sajak owned Maryland-based AM radio station WNAV in Annapolis.

=== Politics ===
Sajak is a Republican, and has written a number of columns for the conservative magazine Human Events. He is also a regular poster and podcast participant on the conservative blog Ricochet.com. Sajak rejects the scientific consensus on climate change. He is also a financial supporter of the Young America's Foundation, which sponsors conservative speakers on college campuses. Sajak noted in his last appearance as host of Wheel of Fortune that he did not include politics into his hosting duties, saying that the show included "no social issues, no politics" and was "just a game."

=== Sports ===
In 2005, Sajak became an investor in the Golden Baseball League, an independent professional baseball league with teams in California, Arizona, Nevada, Utah, Alberta, British Columbia, and Baja California. During a guest appearance in the broadcast booth at a March 2012 Baltimore Orioles – Boston Red Sox spring-training game, Sajak acknowledged that he had called some baseball games in the past.

Sajak is an avid fan of the Washington Capitals NHL team. He is a longtime season-ticket holder and made an on-ice appearance before game three of the 2018 Stanley Cup Final.

=== Health ===
On November 8, 2019, Sajak experienced severe abdominal pain in which he underwent emergency intestinal surgery to remove the blockage. While Sajak recovered, co-host Vanna White hosted in his place. The first taping day in which he was incapacitated was a two-week Disney-themed Christmas episode. Mickey and Minnie Mouse took over White's role at the puzzle board for those weeks. Sajak's daughter, Maggie, also helped White for a week. Sajak returned to work on December 5, 2019. Sajak revealed in a December 20, 2019, interview with Good Morning America that the pain intensified while at home, which left him in a fetal position with plummeting blood pressure, which prompted fears of his imminent death. He later praised the surgery's success while noting that the physicians identified no underlying cause for the blockage, attributing it to age-related factors.

== Legacy ==
Sajak's 43-year tenure as the host of Wheel of Fortune helped turn the program into a cornerstone of television syndication, achieving constantly higher ratings and broader appeal as a low-pressure family entertainment show. Under his guidance, the show stabilized after the departure of the show's original host Chuck Woolery and thus became one of the longest running game shows in the history of U.S. television. Sajak's affable, quick-witted style helped emphasize puzzle-solving and light-hearted interactions, which helped contribute to the program's role as nightly family viewing.

Sajak's approach to hosting exemplified traditional game show professionalism, which contrasted with modern game show trends favoring celebrity personalities, which helped maintain Wheel of Fortune as a more non-confrontational alternative to more competitive formats. The show's success under his leadership helped permeate it into popular culture, with Sajak noting that it evolved into "more than a popular show" and into a more cultural fixture referenced in the media and praised by notable figures such as Jimmy Stewart and Lucille Ball. This fostered the show's widespread recognition for the mechanics of its spinning wheels, buying vowels, and phrase solving as a shorthand for accessible entertainment, which influenced subsequent puzzle-based programming and merchandising.

Through constant Emmy nominations and the show's continued enduring dominance in syndication, Sajak helped reinforce game shows as a reliable, advertiser-friendly staple, which prioritize viewer engagement over sensationalism, with his retirement marking the end of an era for the "old-school" hosts who rose through the broadcast ranks rather than their prior fame, which underscored a shift in the game show genre toward more higher-profile replacements like his successor Ryan Seacrest.

=== In popular culture ===
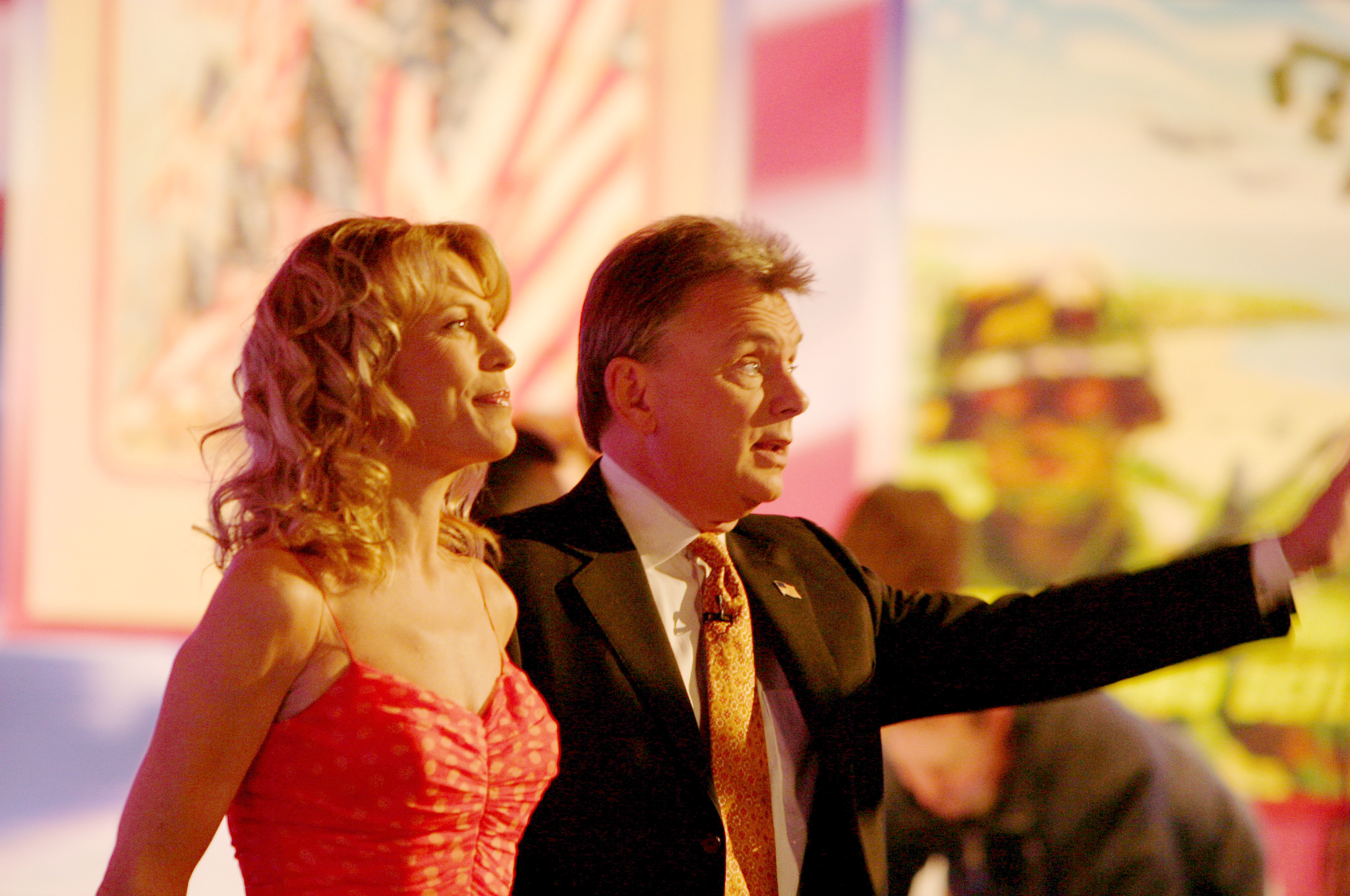
Sajak with Vanna White in 2006

While at WSMV as a meteorologist in the mid-1970s, Sajak commented about "daytime highs and nighttime lows". This prompted songwriter Ben Peters to write "Daytime Friends", which became a country number one hit for Kenny Rogers in 1977.

Sajak was parodied in a 1980s Sesame Street sketch, with a Muppet named Pat Playjacks hosting "Squeal of Fortune". The goal was for the contestants (Prairie Dawn and The Count) to guess how many times a pig in the center of the wheel would squeal before the wheel stopped.

During the 1980s, comedian Martin Short frequently portrayed a fictional character he called Ed Grimley, a hyperactive manchild who is obsessed with banal popular culture – Sajak in particular – on the sketch comedy television shows SCTV and Saturday Night Live.

In 1986, Sajak and his Wheel of Fortune co-star Vanna White portrayed themselves on an episode of the NBC sitcom 227.

In the fourth-season episode of The A-Team called "Wheel of Fortune", Sajak makes a cameo along with co-star Vanna White. In the episode, Murdock wins big at Wheel of Fortune due to Face's system of guessing the letters correctly.

In 1992, Sajak was a special guest star in the TV show The Commish. The episode first aired on November 7, 1992, and was called "The Two Faces of Ed". He played psychologist Brian Brandon.

In the fourth episode of season three of Comedy Central's Brickleberry, "That Brother's My Father", Sajak gets kidnapped and becomes a hostage to the wheel of fortune. In the episode, the character of Connie, a strong and very large but typically kindhearted state park ranger, takes an unhealthy obsession with Sajak and his famous game show, ultimately tying him to a makeshift replica of the wheel itself and attempting a faux-game of Wheel of Fortune with him while behaving erratically.

In the fourth episode of season four of Abbott Elementary, Jacob Hill, a teacher at Abbott Elementary, dresses up as Pat Sajak for Halloween.

== Accolades ==
Sajak has received four Emmy Awards for Outstanding Game Show Host for his work on Wheel of Fortune, having won the award in 1993, 1997, 1998, and in 2024 (his first win in the category in 26 years) for his final season. In 2011, Sajak was honored for his contributions to daytime television with a Lifetime Achievement Award at the Daytime Emmys alongside Alex Trebek. In 1994, Sajak was honored with a star on the Hollywood Walk of Fame.

In 2019, Sajak was officially honored for being the longest running host of any game show for Wheel of Fortune by the Guinness World Records with the episode taped on March 28, 2019, and aired May 8, 2019 (two days before the primetime version's 7,000th episode).

Media offices
Preceded by Chuck Woolery	Host of Wheel of Fortune (daytime); December 28, 1981 – January 9, 1989	Succeeded by Rolf Benirschke
New show	Host of Wheel of Fortune (syndicated); September 19, 1983 – June 7, 2024 (Note: Vanna White temporarily replaced Sajak as host during December 9–20, 2019, and January 6–10, 2020, while he was recovering from surgery)	Succeeded by Ryan Seacrest
Preceded by Art Fleming	College Bowl host 1984 (Televised semifinals and finals)	Succeeded by Dick Cavett; 1987
Awards
Preceded by Bob Barker	Daytime Emmy Award for Outstanding Game Show Host; 1993	Succeeded by Bob Barker
Preceded by Bob Barker	Daytime Emmy Award for Outstanding Game Show Host; 1997–1998	Succeeded by Ben Stein and Jimmy Kimmel
Preceded by Keke Palmer	Primetime Emmy Award for Outstanding Host of a Game Show; 2024	Succeeded by Jimmy Kimmel
Preceded by Agnes Nixon	Recipient of the Lifetime Achievement Award at the Daytime Emmy Awards; 2011; With: Alex Trebek	Succeeded by Bill Geddie
