= Emmy Award for Outstanding Game Show =

Emmy Award for Outstanding Game Show may refer to the following Emmy Awards:

- Daytime Emmy Award for Outstanding Game Show, presented from 1974 to 2022
- Primetime Emmy Award for Outstanding Game Show, presented since 2023
