= Emmy Award for Outstanding Game Show Host =

Emmy Award for Outstanding Game Show Host may refer to the following Emmy Awards:

- Daytime Emmy Award for Outstanding Game Show Host, presented from 1974 to 2022
- Primetime Emmy Award for Outstanding Host for a Game Show, presented since 2023
