= Battlestars (game show) =

American television series

- Logo for Battlestars (1981)
- Also known as: (The New) Battlestars
- Created by: Merrill Heatter
- Written by: Bob Logan; Gary Johnson
- Directed by: Jerome Shaw
- Presented by: Alex Trebek
- Announcer: Rod Roddy; Charlie Tuna
- Theme music composer: Mort Garson
- Country of origin: United States
- No. of seasons: 2
- No. of episodes: 193 (128, 1981–1982; 65, 1983)

Production
- Executive producer: Merrill Heatter
- Producer: Robert Noah
- Production locations: NBC Studios; Burbank, California
- Running time: 22 minutes
- Production company: Merrill Heatter Productions

Original release
- Network: NBC
- Release: October 26, 1981 – April 23, 1982
- Release: April 4 – July 1, 1983

Battlestars is an American game show that aired on NBC during the 1980s. The program's concept was developed and produced by Merrill Heatter, featuring a six-celebrity panel. The object of the game is to "capture" the celebrities by lighting up numbers positioned around triangle shapes, inside of which sat each panelist. Similar to Hollywood Squares, which Heatter also co-created and produced, the celebrities are asked questions by the host, and the contestants judge the truth of their answers in order to light up the numbers.

The show premiered on October 26, 1981, with Alex Trebek hosting and Rod Roddy serving as the announcer. This marked Heatter's first solo production since his former production partner, Bob Quigley, retired and their company was dissolved in June 1981. The program ran until April 23, 1982.

Less than a year after its cancellation, NBC commissioned another edition of Battlestars as a replacement for the cancelled Just Men!. The New Battlestars premiered on April 4, 1983 with Trebek returning as host but with Charlie Tuna replacing Rod Roddy as announcer. The series ultimately met the same fate as its predecessor and was cancelled after thirteen weeks with the final episode airing on July 1, 1983.

== Main game ==
The six celebrities sat within two rows of triangular frames, oriented so that the lower edge of the top row became the upper edge of the bottom one. The numbers from 1 to 10 appeared at the corners of the frames.

Two contestants competed, typically a returning champion at a blue desk and a challenger at a red one. To begin the game, the champion pushed a plunger to stop a flashing randomizer and highlight one number associated with a corner of a celebrity's triangle. If the number corresponded to one or more celebrities who could be captured on that turn, the contestant had to choose one of them; otherwise, he/she chose any un-captured celebrity marked by that number. The host asked a question and two answers appeared on a screen visible to the celebrity but hidden from the contestant. The celebrity chose the answer he/she believed to be correct. The contestant retained control by correctly agreeing or disagreeing with the response; otherwise, the turn ended and the opponent played.

A celebrity was "captured" once all three numbers around his/her triangle were lit, and the triangle would be highlighted with the capturing player's color. Multiple captures on a single turn were possible. Each number remained lit after it was hit by the randomizer, unless it was needed to complete a capture and the contestant incorrectly agreed/disagreed. In this case, a new question was asked to the same celebrity and the opponent had a chance to capture.

The first contestant to capture any three celebrities won the game and advanced to the bonus round. Any contestant who captured all six celebrities in a single game won a bonus (originally a prize, later $1,000 cash). Since the champion played first, it was possible for the challenger to lose without ever taking a turn, in which case he/she returned to play the next game. Champions remained on the show until they were defeated or had played the bonus round 20 times (reduced to five in 1983).

The rules were changed slightly in 1983. All of the numbers were initially lit and had to be put out in order to capture celebrities. The first question of a contestant's turn used the randomizer, but a correct answer allowed him/her to choose the number at stake for the next question. The two answers for each question were displayed on-screen for the home viewers' benefit, but were still not shown to the contestant.

== Bonus game ==
=== 1981–1982: Battlestars Two/Picture Game ===
A photograph of a celebrity was hidden behind a grid of 20 squares, with the corners left blank. The remaining squares were numbered from 1 to 16, each corresponding to a different card in a stack. The champion selected three cards, and the host inserted them into an electronic reader to determine which squares they represented. Those three squares were revealed, and the champion was allowed to reveal one more square of his/her choice and then offer one guess at the subject for $5,000. During a week of Christmas shows in December 1981, the top prize was doubled to $10,000.

If the champion could not identify the subject after the four squares were revealed, he/she would draw up to three more cards. From this point forward, the six celebrities were also allowed to offer guesses; if the champion was unable to identify the subject by his/her self, he/she could also win the round by having a celebrity identify the person. Doing so after the first draw won the champion $3,000, while the second was worth $2,000 and the third $1,000. If the subject still had not been identified after this, the champion would select another square and the prize was reduced to $500. If still unsuccessful, the champion was allowed to select one last square and the prize was reduced to $250 if the subject was identified.

During the first few weeks of the show's run, the champion chose a square to reveal before drawing the three initial cards. If the card for that square was chosen during the round, he/she was allowed to draw again. The free choice was later moved to occur after the three draws in order to save time.

=== 1983: The Main Event ===
The champion selected any three of the celebrities he/she had captured during the game to participate in this round, and decided the order in which they would play. Each celebrity in turn was asked one question with three answer options, which were displayed to both him/her and the champion. In order to win a question, the champion had to either agree with a correct answer given by the celebrity, or disagree with a wrong answer and then give the correct one from the remaining two choices. If the champion won all three questions, he/she won the Battlestars Bonanza, a jackpot containing $5,000 cash and a collection of prizes that grew in value for every game in which it was not won. Otherwise, the contestant received $500 for each correct decision. The typical starting total value of the Bonanza was usually over $10,000.

== Broadcast history ==
NBC scheduled the first version of Battlestars at 11:30 a.m./10:30 Central, replacing Card Sharks and switching places with Password Plus. However, it failed to find ratings against the second half of CBS's The Price Is Right. NBC decided not to renew Battlestars after two thirteen-week cycles of episodes and removed both it and Blockbusters from its lineup to accommodate another of its struggling daytime series, the soap opera Texas, which the network moved to the 11:00 hour.

Logo for The New Battlestars (1983)

A little less than a year after its cancellation, the now-New Battlestars premiered in NBC's 12pm Eastern/11am Central time slot and replaced the cancelled Just Men! there. Like many shows before it, The New Battlestars found ratings trouble due to the popularity of ABC's Family Feud, CBS's The Young and the Restless, and preemptions for newscasts and other programming on various affiliates. Thus, NBC did not renew The New Battlestars when its thirteen-week contract expired and replaced the series with The Facts of Life reruns. NBC did not try another game show in the slot until the short-lived Go premiered later in the year and did not find a hit show until Super Password premiered in 1984 and stayed on the air until 1989.
