= Primetime Emmy Award for Outstanding Game Show =

- Awarded for: Outstanding Game Show
- Country: United States
- Presented by: Academy of Television Arts & Sciences
- First award: 2023
- Currently held by: Jeopardy! (2026)
- Website: emmys.com
- Related: Replaced the Daytime Emmy Award for Outstanding Game Show

The Primetime Emmy Award for Outstanding Game Show is an award that was first presented in 2023. Before the creation of the category, game shows were eligible in Outstanding Reality Competition Program or the Daytime Emmy category of Outstanding Game Show.

== Winners and nominations ==
In the following list, the first titles listed are winners; the others are nominees, which are listed in alphabetical order. The years given are those in which the ceremonies were held:

=== 2020s ===
Year	Program	Producers	Network
2023 (75th)
2023 (75th)	Jeopardy!	Michael Davies, executive producer; Lisa Broffman, co-executive producer; Rocky Schmidt, supervising producer; Sarah Whitcomb Foss, producer; Billy Wisse, Michele Loud, John Duarte, Mark Gaberman, Debbie Griffin, Robert McClenaghan and Jim Rhine, writers	ABC / Syndicated
2023 (75th)	Family Feud	Gaby Johnston, executive producer; Kristin Bjorklund, Sara Dansby and Brian Hawley, co-executive producers; Michele Roth, senior producer; Mary Lou Browne, Stephen Dukes, Dennis Galligan and Hugh Wright, producers	ABC / Syndicated
2023 (75th)	The Price Is Right	Evelyn Warfel, executive producer; Adam Sandler and Darren Belitsky, co-executive producers; Justin Rae Barnes, supervising producer; Brandi Bryce and Chris Donnan, senior producers; Whitney Kieser, producer	CBS
2023 (75th)	That's My Jam	Jimmy Fallon and Jim Juvonen, executive producers; Mike Yurchuk, executive producer/writer; Jessie Binkow, May Johnson and Mike Deffina, co-executive producers; Josh Knapp, supervising producer/head writer; Stad St. Fleur, Kevin McCarthy and Alexx Wells, senior producers; Matt Barker and Eli Braden, producers; Dave Ferguson, supervising writer; N.A. Smolenski, Evan Williams and Eudora Peterson, writers	NBC
2023 (75th)	Wheel of Fortune	Bellamie Blackstone, executive producer; Steve Schwartz, co-executive producer; Amanda Stern, supervising producer; Rob Roman and Brooke Eaton, producers	Syndicated
2024 (76th)
2024 (76th)	Jeopardy!	Michael Davies, executive producer; Lisa Broffman, co-executive producer; Sarah Whitcomb Foss, producer; Billy Wisse, Michele Loud, Marcus Brown, John Duarte, Mark Gaberman, Debbie Griffin, Robert McClenaghan, Jim Rhine and Steve Tamerius, writers	ABC / Syndicated
2024 (76th)	Celebrity Family Feud	Gaby Johnston and Jim Roush, executive producers; Kristin Bjorklund, Sara Dansby and Brian Hawley, co-executive producers; Stephanie Yoshimura, supervising producer; Michele Roth, senior producer; Mary Lou Browne, Stephen Dukes, Dennis Galligan and Hugh Wright, producers	ABC
2024 (76th)	Password	Jimmy Fallon, John Quinn and Jim Juvonen, executive producers; Jennifer Ryan, co-executive producer; Chana Shwadlenak, supervising producer; Kevin Cook, Chyna Dumas, Rylee Newton and Matthew Timmons, content producers	NBC
2024 (76th)	The Price Is Right at Night	Evelyn Warfel, executive producer; Adam Sandler and Darren Belitsky, co-executive producers; Taline Kevoian, supervising producer; Chris Donnan, Brandi Bryce and Whitney Kieser, senior producers; Kimberly Lowry, producer	CBS
2024 (76th)	Wheel of Fortune	Bellamie Blackstone, executive producer; Steve Schwartz and Genna Gintzig, co-executive producers; Amanda Stern, supervising producer; Robert Roman, Brooke Eaton and Randy Berke, producers	ABC / Syndicated
2025 (77th)
2025 (77th)	Jeopardy!	Michael Davies, executive producer; Bari Jean Dorman, co-executive producer/producer; Sarah Whitcomb Foss, producer; Billy Wisse and Michele Loud, co-head writers & editorial producers; Marcus Brown, John Duarte, Mark Gaberman, Debbie Griffin, Robert McClenaghan, Jim Rhine and Steve Tamerius, writers	ABC / Syndicated
2025 (77th)	Celebrity Family Feud	Myeshia Mizuno, Steve Harvey, Jim Roush, Sara Dansby and Brian Hawley, executive producers; Melissa Watkins Trueblood, co-executive producer; Stephanie Yoshimura, supervising producer; Mary Lou Browne, Maxim Caradonna and Sydney Smith, producers; Stephen Dukes, Bryce Keigley and Michele Roth, senior producers	ABC
2025 (77th)	The Price Is Right	Evelyn Warfel, executive producer; Taline Kevoian, co-executive producer; Gina Sprehe, supervising producer; Chris Donnan, Brandi Bryce and Jill Salama, senior producers	CBS
2025 (77th)	Wheel of Fortune	Bellamie Blackstone, executive producer; Genna Gintzig, co-executive producer; Amanda Stern, supervising producer; Randy Berke, Brooke Eaton, Rob Roman and Andrew Schotz, producers	ABC / Syndicated
2025 (77th)	Who Wants to Be a Millionaire	Michael Davies and Jimmy Kimmel, executive producers; Bobby Patton, co-executive producer and head writer; Bari Jean Dorman, co-executive producer; Colleen Bulger, supervising producer; Derek Miller, producer; Kyle Beakley, Amy Ozols, Ellen Teitel, David Levinson Wilk, Josh Halloway, Jesse Joyce and Kevin Kimmel, writers	ABC
2026 (78th)
2026 (78th)	Jeopardy!	Michael Davies, executive producer; Sarah Whitcomb Foss and Bari Jean Dorman, co-executive producers; Laura Mueller, line producer; Billy Wisse and Michele Loud, head writers; Marcus Brown, John Duarte, Mark Gaberman, Debbie Griffin, Robert McClenaghan, Amy Ozols and Jim Rhine, writers	ABC / Syndicated
2026 (78th)	Celebrity Family Feud	Myeshia Mizuno, Steve Harvey, Jim Roush, Sara Dansby and Brian Hawley, executive producers; Stephanie Yoshimura, co-executive producer; Bryce Keigley, supervising producer; Julio F. Alva, line producer; Stephen Dukes and Michele Roth, senior producers; Maxim Caradonna and Sydney Smith, producers	ABC
2026 (78th)	The Price Is Right	John Quinn, executive producer; Taline Kevoian, co-executive producer; Aaron Sandler, Chris Donnan and Jersey Feimster, supervising producers; Jill Salama, senior producer; Devan Schefferine and Lauren Chamberlin, producers; Richard Sankey, line producer	CBS
2026 (78th)	Wheel of Fortune	Bellamie Blackstone, executive producer; Genna Gintzig, co-executive producer; Amanda Stern, supervising producer; Randy Berke, senior producer; Brooke Eaton, Andrew Schotz and Rob Roman, producers	ABC
2026 (78th)	Who Wants to Be a Millionaire	Michael Davies and Jimmy Kimmel, executive producers; Bari Jean Dorman, co-executive producer; Colleen Bulger, supervising producer; Laura Mueller, line producer; Kyle Beakley, head writer; David Levinson Wilk, Ellen Teitel, Jason Antoniewicz, Josh Halloway, Jesse Joyce, Kevin Kimmel and Brian Greene, writers	ABC

== Programs with multiple wins ==
4 wins

- Jeopardy!

== Programs with multiple nominations ==
4 nominations

- Family Feud
- Jeopardy!
- The Price Is Right
- Wheel of Fortune

2 nominations

- Who Wants to Be a Millionaire
