= Just Men! =

American game show

- Betty White hosting Just Men!
- Genre: Game show
- Created by: Rick Rosner
- Directed by: Bill Foster
- Presented by: Betty White
- Announcer: Steve Day
- Theme music composer: Stormy Sacks
- Country of origin: United States
- No. of episodes: 65

Production
- Executive producer: Rick Rosner
- Producer: Rickie Gaffney
- Production locations: NBC Studios; Burbank, California
- Running time: 24 mins.
- Production companies: Century Towers Productions; Rosner Television; Orion Television

Original release
- Network: NBC
- Release: January 3 – April 1, 1983

Just Men! is an American game show that aired on NBC Daytime from January 3 to April 1, 1983. The show starred Betty White, who won an Emmy award for her work on the show, with Steve Day announcing. It pitted two female contestants who were asked to predict answers to a series of yes/no questions posed previously to a panel of seven male celebrities.

The show was created and produced by Rick Rosner, who was producing CHiPs at the time for NBC, and was a joint production of Rosner Television, Century Towers Productions, and Orion Television. This was one of two collaborations among the three entities. Rosner was later responsible for reviving another NBC game show, Hollywood Squares, which he co-produced with Century Towers with Orion distributing.

The general format of the game, in which the contestant determines whether a celebrity answers "yes" or "no" to a question, is similar to Heatter-Quigley's The Celebrity Game, which aired on CBS from 1964 to 1965.

This was also the first game show in history to have two female contestants playing prior to another short-lived, male-oriented game show Mind of a Man hosted by comedian DeRay Davis that also featured two female contestants playing that aired on Game Show Network (GSN) in 2014.

== Gameplay ==
Two female contestants, one usually a returning champion, competed for a chance to win a car displayed on the stage. At the beginning of each episode, the host used the car's actual ignition key to start it, then dropped that key and six others into a clear plastic box fitted with internal chutes to mix them. One key was given to each panelist; throughout the main game, a panelist stopped taking any active role once a contestant had claimed his key. The champion played first in every round.

=== Round 1 ===
The contestants were presented with a question to which at least two panelists had answered "yes." Each contestant questioned the panel for one minute, using a provided list of topic-related questions, then attempted to select one panelist she believed had said "yes." A correct guess awarded that panelist's key. If both contestants guessed correctly, the round ended at that point. Otherwise, they took turns asking one question at a time to any one panelist of their choice and predicting who said "yes"; the round ended once a total of two keys had been claimed.

=== Round 2 ===
The contestants were presented with a question to which at least two of the remaining five panelists had answered "no." They questioned the panel as in Round 1 and attempted to guess who had answered "no." As in Round 1, a correct guess awarded the panelist's key; however, a miss gave the key to the opponent. Each contestant had one turn.

=== Round 3 (Catch-Up Round) ===
A third question was presented, with no announcement as to how many of the remaining three panelists had answered either way. The contestants took turns questioning one panelist at a time and predicting his response. A correct guess awarded that panelist's key and allowed the contestant to steal one key from her opponent, while a miss gave the key and the steal to the opponent.

This round ended after all seven keys had been claimed, at which point the contestant holding more keys won the game. The loser received one consolation prize for each key she held, but was guaranteed a minimum of one prize.

=== Bonus round ===
The champion selected one of the keys she held for every main-game victory to that point, and could select one more key if she had claimed all seven. She sat in the driver's seat of the car, with the panelist(s) originally associated with the chosen key(s) gathered around or sitting in it, and tried one at a time in the ignition. If the car started, she won it and retired undefeated; if not, the host identified the correct key and opened the trunk with it, revealing a prize the champion received.

Any champion who won seven consecutive games automatically won the car and retired undefeated.

== Broadcast history ==
Just Men! premiered on NBC January 3, 1983, along with two other game shows: Hit Man and a revival of Sale of the Century. The program aired at 12:00 noon Eastern/11:00 a.m. Central, though some stations such as WRC-TV in Washington, D.C. aired the program on next-day tape delay. Like many game shows in this time slot, Just Men! suffered from low affiliate clearances, as many larger markets aired newscasts at noon by 1983. The show lasted just thirteen weeks, ending its run on April 1, 1983. It was replaced in its time slot by The New Battlestars, which also ended after thirteen weeks.

Just Men! aired opposite Family Feud on ABC nationwide, and The Young and the Restless on CBS outside the Eastern Time Zone. (Note: CBS had allocated the 12:00 Noon time slot to local programming in Eastern Time. In some Eastern markets, such as New York City, Just Men! aired opposite Tattletales, which aired at 12:00 Noon instead of 4 p.m. ET.)

Despite the show's short run, Betty White made television history. She became the second woman to be nominated for the Daytime Emmy Award for Outstanding Game Show Host by herself (Susan Stafford was nominated in 1978) and the first to win the award in 1983, when she was voted ahead of Dick Clark and Richard Dawson. White was nominated for a second straight year in 1984, but finished behind Bob Barker and Dawson.

== Critical response ==
Tom Shales of The Washington Post called the show "the litmus test for people who think the TV show that can make them physically ill hasn't been invented." He criticized the nature of questions asked during the show and wrote, "White, a talented light comedian, is terribly demeaned by this role, which has her hobbling about from man to man as they utter answers or remarks that are supposedly uproarious."
