= Daytime Emmy Award for Outstanding Game Show =

Former television award

- Awarded for: Outstanding Game Show
- Country: United States
- Presented by: NATAS; ATAS
- First award: 1974
- Final award: 2022

Highlights
- Most awards: Jeopardy! (19)
- Most nominations: Jeopardy! (38)
- Website: theemmys.tv/daytime/
- Related: Replaced by the Primetime Emmy Award for Outstanding Game Show

The Daytime Emmy Award for Outstanding Game Show was an award presented annually by the National Academy of Television Arts and Sciences (NATAS) and Academy of Television Arts & Sciences (ATAS). It was given in honor of a game show that features "contestants, either alone or as part of a team, who play a game involving answering questions or solving problems for money and/or prizes". Programs that have aired at least 15 original episodes for the calendar year are eligible to enter. In 2020, a category requirement has changed, lowering the number of required original episodes from fifteen to eight.

The 1st Daytime Emmy Awards ceremony was held in 1974 with the game show Password receiving the award. The award category was originally called Outstanding Game/Audience Participation Show before changing to its current title in 2013. The awards ceremony was not aired on television in 1983 and 1984, having been criticized for voting integrity.

Since its inception, the award has been given to ten game shows. In 1980, The $20,000 Pyramid and Hollywood Squares tied for the award, which was the first tie in this category. This situation repeated later only in 2011, with Jeopardy! and Wheel of Fortune both winning the award. In 2006, Jeopardy! became the series with the most wins in the category when it won a tenth time, surpassing Pyramid's previous record of nine; Jeopardy! went on to win in six additional years, ultimately receiving seventeen wins. Jeopardy! also has been nominated on 36 occasions, more than any other series.

In 2023, this category was moved to the Primetime Emmy Awards as part of a re-alignment of categories between the NATAS and ATAS.

== Winners and nominees ==
Table key
‡	Indicates the winner

=== 1970s ===
Year	Program	Network	Ref.
1974 (1st)
1974 (1st)	Password ‡	ABC	
1974 (1st)	Hollywood Squares	NBC	
1974 (1st)	Jeopardy!	NBC	
1975 (2nd)
1975 (2nd)	Hollywood Squares ‡	NBC	
1975 (2nd)	The $10,000 Pyramid	ABC	
1975 (2nd)	Jeopardy!	NBC	
1975 (2nd)	Let's Make a Deal	ABC	
1976 (3rd)
1976 (3rd)	The $20,000 Pyramid ‡	ABC	
1976 (3rd)	Hollywood Squares	NBC	
1976 (3rd)	Let's Make a Deal	ABC	
1976 (3rd)	Match Game	CBS	
1976 (3rd)	The Price Is Right	CBS	
1977 (4th)
1977 (4th)	Family Feud ‡	ABC	
1977 (4th)	The $10,000 Pyramid	ABC	
1977 (4th)	Hollywood Squares	NBC	
1977 (4th)	Match Game	CBS	
1977 (4th)	Tattletales	CBS	
1978 (5th)
1978 (5th)	Hollywood Squares ‡	NBC	
1978 (5th)	The $20,000 Pyramid	ABC	
1978 (5th)	Family Feud	ABC	
1979 (6th)
1979 (6th)	Hollywood Squares ‡	NBC	
1979 (6th)	The $20,000 Pyramid	ABC	
1979 (6th)	Family Feud	ABC	

=== 1980s ===
Year	Program	Network	Ref.
1980 (7th)
1980 (7th)	The $20,000 Pyramid ‡	ABC	
1980 (7th)	Hollywood Squares ‡	NBC	
1980 (7th)	Family Feud	ABC	
1981 (8th)
1981 (8th)	The $20,000 Pyramid ‡	ABC	
1981 (8th)	Family Feud	ABC	
1981 (8th)	Hollywood Squares	NBC	
1982 (9th)
1982 (9th)	Password Plus ‡	NBC	
1982 (9th)	Family Feud	ABC	
1982 (9th)	The Price Is Right	CBS	
1982 (9th)	Wheel of Fortune	NBC	
1983 (10th)
1983 (10th)	The $25,000 Pyramid ‡	CBS	
1983 (10th)	Family Feud	Syndicated	
1983 (10th)	The Price Is Right	CBS	
1984 (11th)
1984 (11th)	The $25,000 Pyramid ‡	CBS	
1984 (11th)	Family Feud	Syndicated	
1984 (11th)	The Price Is Right	CBS	
1985 (12th)
1985 (12th)	The $25,000 Pyramid ‡	CBS	
1985 (12th)	Family Feud	Syndicated	
1985 (12th)	Jeopardy!	Syndicated	
1985 (12th)	The Price Is Right	CBS	
1985 (12th)	Wheel of Fortune	Syndicated	
1986 (13th)
1986 (13th)	The $25,000 Pyramid ‡	CBS	
1986 (13th)	Family Feud	Syndicated	
1986 (13th)	Jeopardy!	Syndicated	
1986 (13th)	The Price Is Right	CBS	
1986 (13th)	Wheel of Fortune	Syndicated	
1987 (14th)
1987 (14th)	The $25,000 Pyramid ‡	CBS	
1987 (14th)	Jeopardy!	Syndicated	
1987 (14th)	The Price Is Right	CBS	
1987 (14th)	Wheel of Fortune	Syndicated	
1988 (15th)
1988 (15th)	The Price Is Right ‡	CBS	
1988 (15th)	The $25,000 Pyramid	CBS	
1988 (15th)	Wheel of Fortune	Syndicated	
1988 (15th)	Win, Lose or Draw	NBC	
1989 (16th)
1989 (16th)	The $25,000 Pyramid ‡	CBS	
1989 (16th)	Jeopardy!	Syndicated	
1989 (16th)	The Price Is Right	CBS	
1989 (16th)	Wheel of Fortune	Syndicated	
1989 (16th)	Win, Lose or Draw	NBC	

=== 1990s ===
Year	Program	Network	Ref.
1990 (17th)
1990 (17th)	Jeopardy! ‡	Syndicated	
1990 (17th)	The Price Is Right	CBS	
1990 (17th)	Wheel of Fortune	Syndicated	
1990 (17th)	Win, Lose or Draw	NBC	
1991 (18th)
1991 (18th)	Jeopardy! ‡	Syndicated	
1991 (18th)	The $100,000 Pyramid	Syndicated	
1991 (18th)	The Price Is Right	CBS	
1991 (18th)	Wheel of Fortune	CBS	
1992 (19th)
1992 (19th)	Jeopardy! ‡	Syndicated	
1992 (19th)	The $100,000 Pyramid	Syndicated	
1992 (19th)	Family Feud	Syndicated	
1992 (19th)	The Price Is Right	CBS	
1993 (20th)
1993 (20th)	Jeopardy! ‡	Syndicated	
1993 (20th)	The Family Feud Challenge	CBS	
1993 (20th)	The Price Is Right	CBS	
1993 (20th)	Wheel of Fortune	Syndicated	
1994 (21st)
1994 (21st)	Jeopardy! ‡	Syndicated	
1994 (21st)	The Price Is Right	CBS	
1994 (21st)	Wheel of Fortune	Syndicated	
1995 (22nd)
1995 (22nd)	Jeopardy! ‡	Syndicated	
1995 (22nd)	American Gladiators	Syndicated	
1995 (22nd)	MTV's 4th Annual Rock 'n' Jock B-Ball Jam	MTV	
1995 (22nd)	The Price Is Right	CBS	
1995 (22nd)	Wheel of Fortune	Syndicated	
1996 (23rd)
1996 (23rd)	The Price Is Right ‡	CBS	
1996 (23rd)	Jeopardy!	Syndicated	
1997 (24th)
1997 (24th)	The Price Is Right ‡	CBS	
1997 (24th)	Debt	Lifetime	
1997 (24th)	Jeopardy!	Syndicated	
1997 (24th)	Secrets of the Cryptkeeper's Haunted House	CBS	
1997 (24th)	Wheel of Fortune	Syndicated	
1998 (25th)
1998 (25th)	Jeopardy! ‡	Syndicated	
1998 (25th)	Pictionary	Syndicated	
1998 (25th)	The Price Is Right	CBS	
1998 (25th)	Wheel of Fortune	Syndicated	
1998 (25th)	Win Ben Stein's Money	Comedy Central	
1999 (26th)
1999 (26th)	Win Ben Stein's Money ‡	Comedy Central	
1999 (26th)	Hollywood Squares	Syndicated	
1999 (26th)	Jeopardy!	Syndicated	
1999 (26th)	The Price Is Right	CBS	
1999 (26th)	Wheel of Fortune	Syndicated	

=== 2000s ===
Year	Program	Network	Ref.
2000 (27th)
2000 (27th)	Who Wants to Be a Millionaire ‡	ABC	
2000 (27th)	Hollywood Squares	Syndicated	
2000 (27th)	Jeopardy!	Syndicated	
2000 (27th)	The Price Is Right	CBS	
2000 (27th)	Win Ben Stein's Money	Comedy Central	
2001 (28th)
2001 (28th)	Who Wants to Be a Millionaire ‡	ABC	
2001 (28th)	Hollywood Squares	Syndicated	
2001 (28th)	Jeopardy!	Syndicated	
2001 (28th)	The Price Is Right	CBS	
2001 (28th)	Win Ben Stein's Money	Comedy Central	
2002 (29th)
2002 (29th)	Jeopardy! ‡	Syndicated	
2002 (29th)	Hollywood Squares	Syndicated	
2002 (29th)	The Price Is Right	CBS	
2002 (29th)	Win Ben Stein's Money	Comedy Central	
2003 (30th)
2003 (30th)	Jeopardy! ‡	Syndicated	
2003 (30th)	Hollywood Squares	Syndicated	
2003 (30th)	The Price Is Right	CBS	
2003 (30th)	Wheel of Fortune	Syndicated	
2003 (30th)	Win Ben Stein's Money	Comedy Central	
2004 (31st)
2004 (31st)	The Price Is Right ‡	CBS	
2004 (31st)	Jeopardy!	Syndicated	
2004 (31st)	Who Wants to Be a Millionaire	Syndicated	
2005 (32nd)
2005 (32nd)	Jeopardy! ‡	Syndicated	
2005 (32nd)	The Price Is Right	CBS	
2005 (32nd)	Who Wants to Be a Millionaire	Syndicated	
2006 (33rd)
2006 (33rd)	Jeopardy! ‡	Syndicated	
2006 (33rd)	Who Wants to Be a Millionaire	Syndicated	
2007 (34th)
2007 (34th)	The Price Is Right ‡	CBS	
2007 (34th)	Jeopardy!	Syndicated	
2007 (34th)	Who Wants to Be a Millionaire	Syndicated	
2008 (35th)
2008 (35th)	Cash Cab ‡	Discovery Channel	
2008 (35th)	Jeopardy!	Syndicated	
2008 (35th)	The Price Is Right	CBS	
2009 (36th)
2009 (36th)	Cash Cab ‡	Discovery Channel	
2009 (36th)	Jeopardy!	Syndicated	
2009 (36th)	Who Wants to Be a Millionaire	Syndicated	

=== 2010s ===
Year	Program	Network	Ref.
2010 (37th)
2010 (37th)	Cash Cab ‡	Discovery Channel	
2010 (37th)	Are You Smarter than a 5th Grader?	FOX	
2010 (37th)	Jeopardy!	Syndicated	
2010 (37th)	The Price Is Right	CBS	
2010 (37th)	Wheel of Fortune	Syndicated	
2011 (38th)
2011 (38th)	Jeopardy! ‡	Syndicated	
2011 (38th)	Wheel of Fortune ‡	Syndicated	
2011 (38th)	Cash Cab	Discovery Channel	
2011 (38th)	The Price Is Right	CBS	
2012 (39th)
2012 (39th)	Jeopardy! ‡	Syndicated	
2012 (39th)	BrainSurge	Nickelodeon	
2012 (39th)	Cash Cab	Discovery Channel	
2012 (39th)	Let's Make a Deal	CBS	
2012 (39th)	Wheel of Fortune	Syndicated	
2012 (39th)	Who Wants to Be a Millionaire	Syndicated	
2013 (40th)
2013 (40th)	The Price Is Right ‡	CBS	
2013 (40th)	Cash Cab	Discovery Channel	
2013 (40th)	Family Feud	Syndicated	
2013 (40th)	Jeopardy!	Syndicated	
2013 (40th)	Let's Make a Deal	CBS	
2013 (40th)	Who Wants to Be a Millionaire	Syndicated	
2014 (41st)
2014 (41st)	Jeopardy! ‡	Syndicated	
2014 (41st)	The American Bible Challenge	GSN	
2014 (41st)	The Chase	GSN	
2014 (41st)	Let's Make a Deal	CBS	
2014 (41st)	The Price Is Right	CBS	
2014 (41st)	Wheel of Fortune	Syndicated	
2015 (42nd)
2015 (42nd)	Jeopardy! ‡	Syndicated	
2015 (42nd)	Family Feud	Syndicated	
2015 (42nd)	The Price Is Right	CBS	
2016 (43rd)
2016 (43rd)	The Price Is Right ‡	CBS	
2016 (43rd)	Jeopardy!	Syndicated	
2016 (43rd)	Let's Make a Deal	CBS	
2016 (43rd)	Monopoly Millionaires' Club	Syndicated	
2016 (43rd)	Who Wants to Be a Millionaire	Syndicated	
2017 (44th)
2017 (44th)	Jeopardy! ‡	Syndicated	
2017 (44th)	Celebrity Name Game	Syndicated	
2017 (44th)	Family Feud	Syndicated	
2017 (44th)	Let's Make a Deal	CBS	
2017 (44th)	The Price Is Right	CBS	
2018 (45th)
2018 (45th)	The Price Is Right ‡	CBS	
2018 (45th)	Family Feud	Syndicated	
2018 (45th)	Jeopardy!	Syndicated	
2018 (45th)	Let's Make a Deal	CBS	
2018 (45th)	Who Wants to Be a Millionaire	Syndicated	
2019 (46th)
2019 (46th)	Family Feud ‡	Syndicated	
2019 (46th)	Jeopardy!	Syndicated	
2019 (46th)	Let's Make a Deal	CBS	
2019 (46th)	The Price Is Right	CBS	
2019 (46th)	Who Wants to Be a Millionaire	Syndicated	

=== 2020s ===
Year	Program	Network	Ref.
2020 (47th)
2020 (47th)	Jeopardy! ‡	Syndicated	
2020 (47th)	Are You Smarter than a 5th Grader?	Nickelodeon	
2020 (47th)	Double Dare	Nickelodeon	
2020 (47th)	Family Feud	Syndicated	
2020 (47th)	The Price Is Right	CBS	
2021 (48th)
2021 (48th)	Jeopardy! ‡	Syndicated	
2021 (48th)	Family Feud	Syndicated	
2021 (48th)	Let's Make a Deal	CBS	
2021 (48th)	The Price Is Right	CBS	
2021 (48th)	Wheel of Fortune	Syndicated	
2022 (49th)
2022 (49th)	Jeopardy! ‡	Syndicated	
2022 (49th)	Family Feud	Syndicated	
2022 (49th)	Let's Make a Deal	CBS	
2022 (49th)	The Price Is Right	CBS	
2022 (49th)	Wheel of Fortune	Syndicated	

== Multiple wins and nominations ==
The following series received two or more wins in this category:

Wins	Series
19	Jeopardy!
9	Pyramid
8	The Price Is Right
4	Hollywood Squares
3	Cash Cab
2	Who Wants to Be a Millionaire
2	Password franchise
2	Family Feud

The following series received two or more nominations in this category:

Nominations	Series
39	Jeopardy!
39	The Price Is Right
21	Wheel of Fortune
20	Family Feud
14	Pyramid
13	Hollywood Squares
12	Who Wants to Be a Millionaire
11	Let's Make a Deal
6	Cash Cab
6	Win Ben Stein's Money
3	Win, Lose or Draw
2	Are You Smarter Than a 5th Grader?
2	Match Game
2	Password franchise

NOTE: Family Feud, Pyramid, and Password include all versions, regardless of title changes among variants of the franchise.

== See also ==
- Daytime Emmy Award for Outstanding Game Show Host
- Daytime Emmy Award
- Primetime Emmy Award for Outstanding Game Show
