= Primetime Emmy Award for Outstanding Host for a Game Show =

- Awarded for: Outstanding Host for a Game Show
- Country: United States
- Presented by: Academy of Television Arts & Sciences
- First award: 2023
- Currently held by: Jimmy Kimmel, Who Wants to Be a Millionaire (2026)
- Website: emmys.com
- Related: Replaced the Daytime Emmy Award for Outstanding Game Show Host

The Primetime Emmy Award for Outstanding Host for a Game Show is an award that was first presented in 2023.

== History ==
Before the creation of the category, game show hosts were eligible in the Outstanding Host for a Reality or Competition Program category or the Daytime Emmy category of Outstanding Game Show Host.

== Winners and nominations ==
=== 2020s ===
Year	Host	Program	Network
2023 (75th)
2023 (75th)	Keke Palmer	Password	NBC
2023 (75th)	Mayim Bialik	Jeopardy!	Syndicated
2023 (75th)	Steve Harvey	Family Feud	Syndicated
2023 (75th)	Ken Jennings	Jeopardy!	Syndicated
2023 (75th)	Pat Sajak	Wheel of Fortune	Syndicated
2024 (76th)
2024 (76th)	Pat Sajak	Wheel of Fortune	ABC/Syndicated
2024 (76th)	Steve Harvey	Celebrity Family Feud	ABC
2024 (76th)	Ken Jennings	Jeopardy!	ABC/Syndicated
2024 (76th)	Keke Palmer	Password	NBC
2024 (76th)	Jane Lynch	Weakest Link	NBC
2025 (77th)
2025 (77th)	Jimmy Kimmel	Who Wants to Be a Millionaire	ABC
2025 (77th)	Elizabeth Banks	Press Your Luck	ABC
2025 (77th)	Steve Harvey	Celebrity Family Feud	ABC
2025 (77th)	Ken Jennings	Jeopardy!	ABC/Syndicated
2025 (77th)	Colin Jost	Pop Culture Jeopardy!	Prime Video
2026 (78th)
2026 (78th)	Jimmy Kimmel	Who Wants to Be a Millionaire	ABC
2026 (78th)	Steve Harvey	Celebrity Family Feud	ABC
2026 (78th)	Ken Jennings	Jeopardy!	ABC/Syndicated
2026 (78th)	Colin Jost	Pop Culture Jeopardy!	Netflix
2026 (78th)	Martin Short	Match Game	ABC

== Multiple wins ==
2 wins

- Jimmy Kimmel

== Multiple nominations ==
4 nominations

- Steve Harvey
- Ken Jennings

2 nominations

- Colin Jost
- Jimmy Kimmel
- Keke Palmer
- Pat Sajak

== See also ==
- Daytime Emmy Award for Outstanding Game Show Host
- Primetime Emmy Award for Outstanding Host for a Reality or Reality Competition Program
