= Daytime Emmy Award for Outstanding Game Show Host =

Annual award, 1974–2022

Daytime Emmy Awards for Outstanding Game Show Host
- Awarded for: Outstanding Host in a Game Show
- Country: United States
- Presented by: NATAS; ATAS
- First award: 1974
- Final award: 2022

Highlights
- Most awards: Bob Barker (14)
- Most nominations: Alex Trebek (32)
- Website: theemmys.tv/daytime/
- Related: Replaced by the Primetime Emmy Award for Outstanding Host for a Game Show

The Daytime Emmy Award for Outstanding Game Show Host was an award presented annually by the National Academy of Television Arts and Sciences (NATAS) and Academy of Television Arts & Sciences (ATAS). It was given to honor the outstanding work of a game show host who has appeared in at least 19% of total episodes for the calendar year.

The 1st Daytime Emmy Awards ceremony was held in 1974 with Peter Marshall receiving the award for his hosting duty on the panel game show Hollywood Squares. The award category was originally called Outstanding Host or Hostess in a Game or Audience Participation Show before changing to its current title in 1985. The awards ceremony was not aired on television in 1983 and 1984, having been criticized for voting integrity.

Since its inception, the award has been given to 18 hosts. In 1983, Betty White became the first woman to win the award and eventually was joined by Meredith Vieira 22 years later as the only two women to have garnered the award. Steve Harvey and Wayne Brady are the only African American game show hosts to have won the Emmy. In 1990, Bob Barker and Alex Trebek tied for the award, which was the first tie in this category. Also in 1990, Barker became the host with the most wins in the category when he won a fifth time, surpassing Marshall's previous record of four; Barker went on to win in nine additional years, ultimately receiving fourteen wins. Trebek has since received five additional wins. Trebek last won the award at the 2021 ceremony, which was accepted posthumously due to his death in November 2020. Trebek also has been nominated on 32 occasions, more than any other host.

At the 2022 ceremony, Harvey became the last awarded host in this category for his hosting duties on Family Feud. In 2023, this category was moved to the Primetime Emmy Awards as part of a re-alignment of categories between NATAS and ATAS and was renamed Outstanding Host for a Game Show.

== Winners and nominees ==
Listed below are the winners of the award for each year, as well as the other nominees.

Table key
‡	Indicates the winner
†	Indicates a posthumous winner

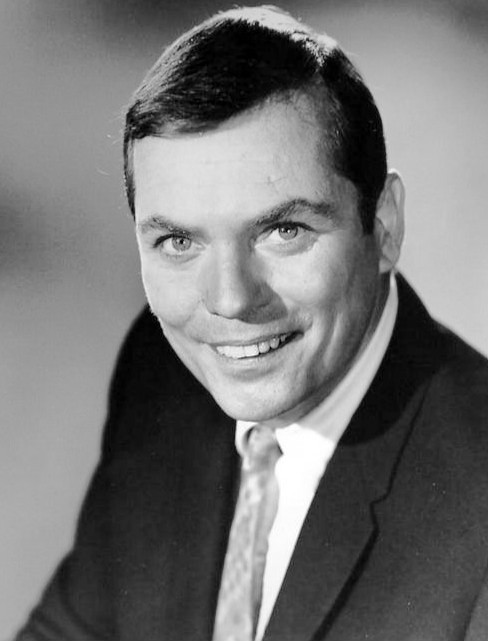
Peter Marshall was the first consecutive winner (1974–75) in this category for hosting Hollywood Squares.

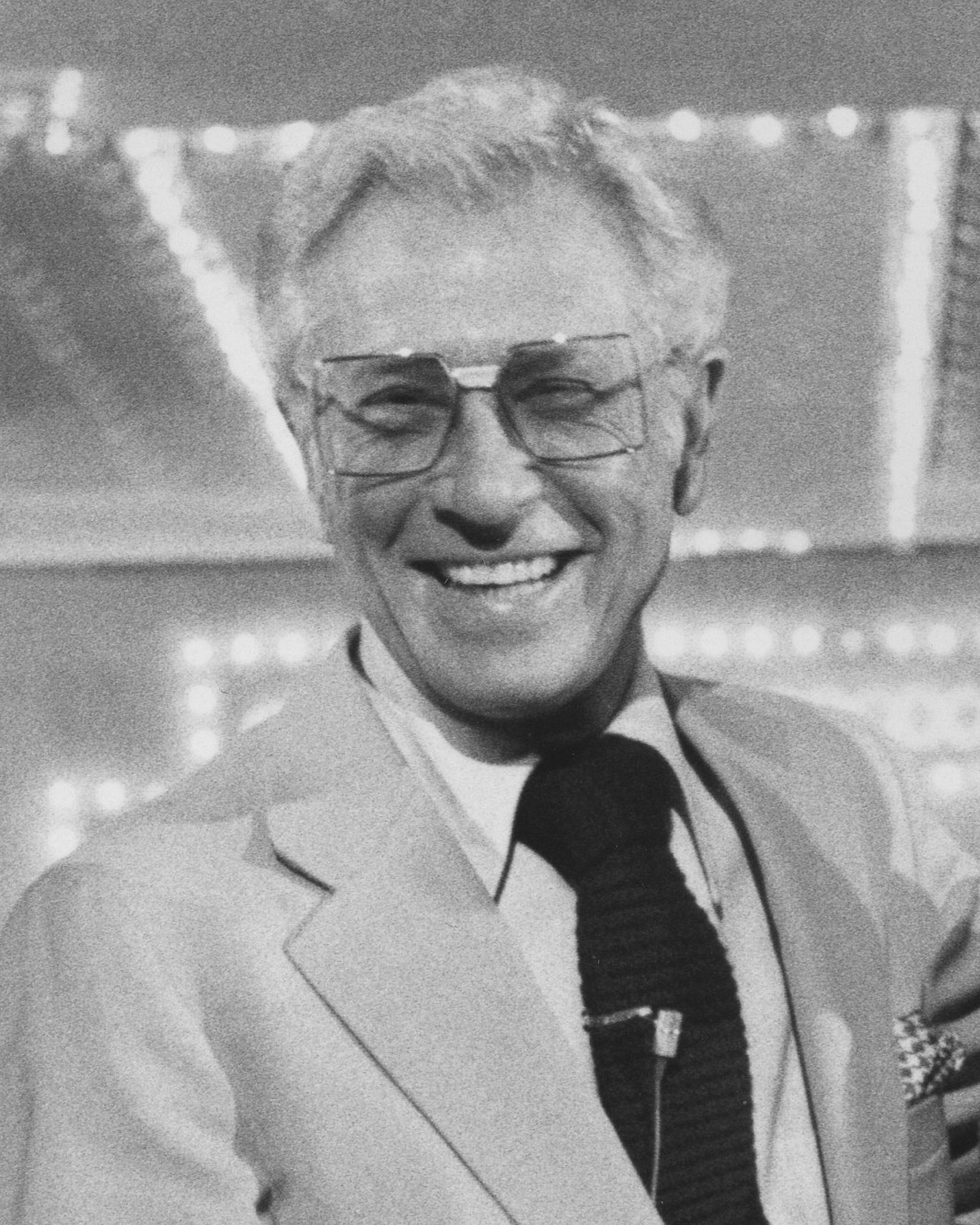
Allen Ludden won in 1976 for hosting Password.

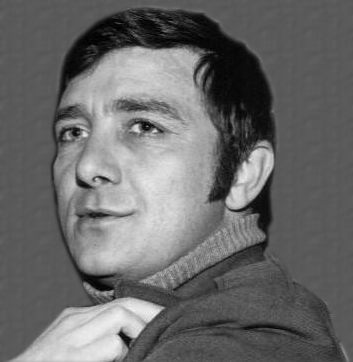
Richard Dawson won once in 1977 (out of seven nominations) for hosting Family Feud.

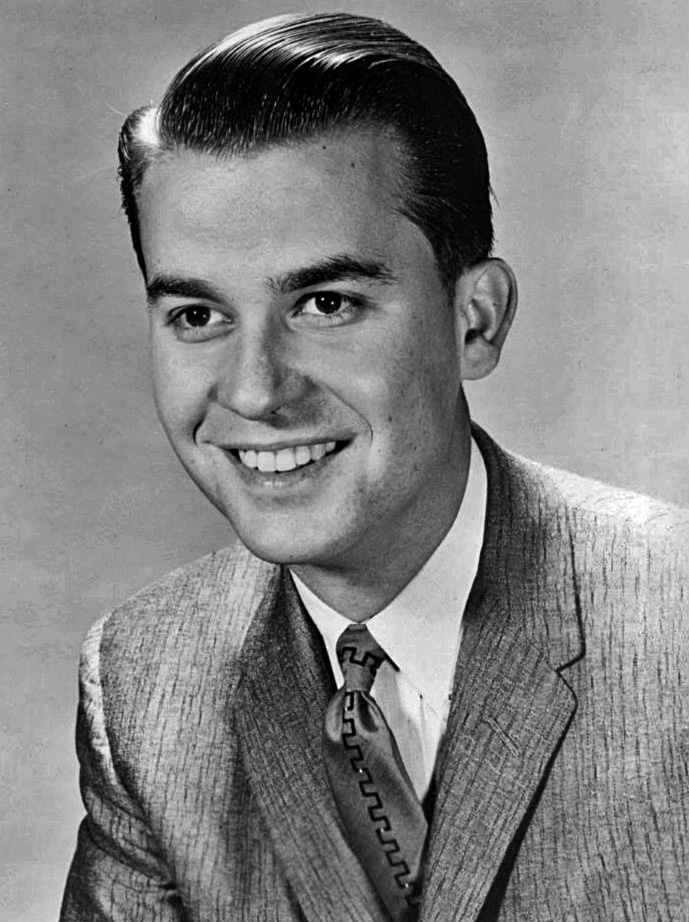
Dick Clark won three (out of ten nominations) for hosting several versions of Pyramid.

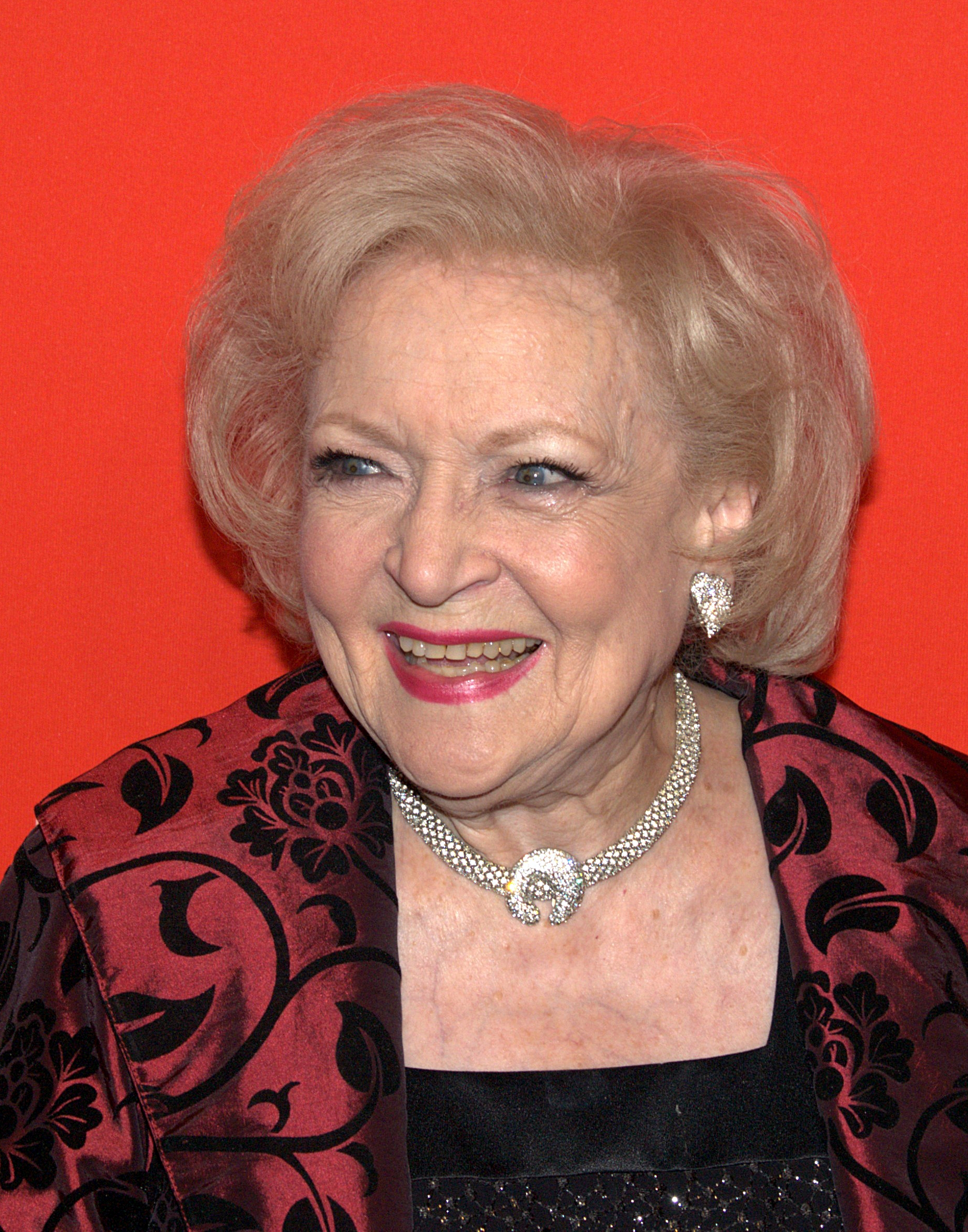
Betty White won in 1983 for hosting Just Men! becoming the first woman to win in this category.

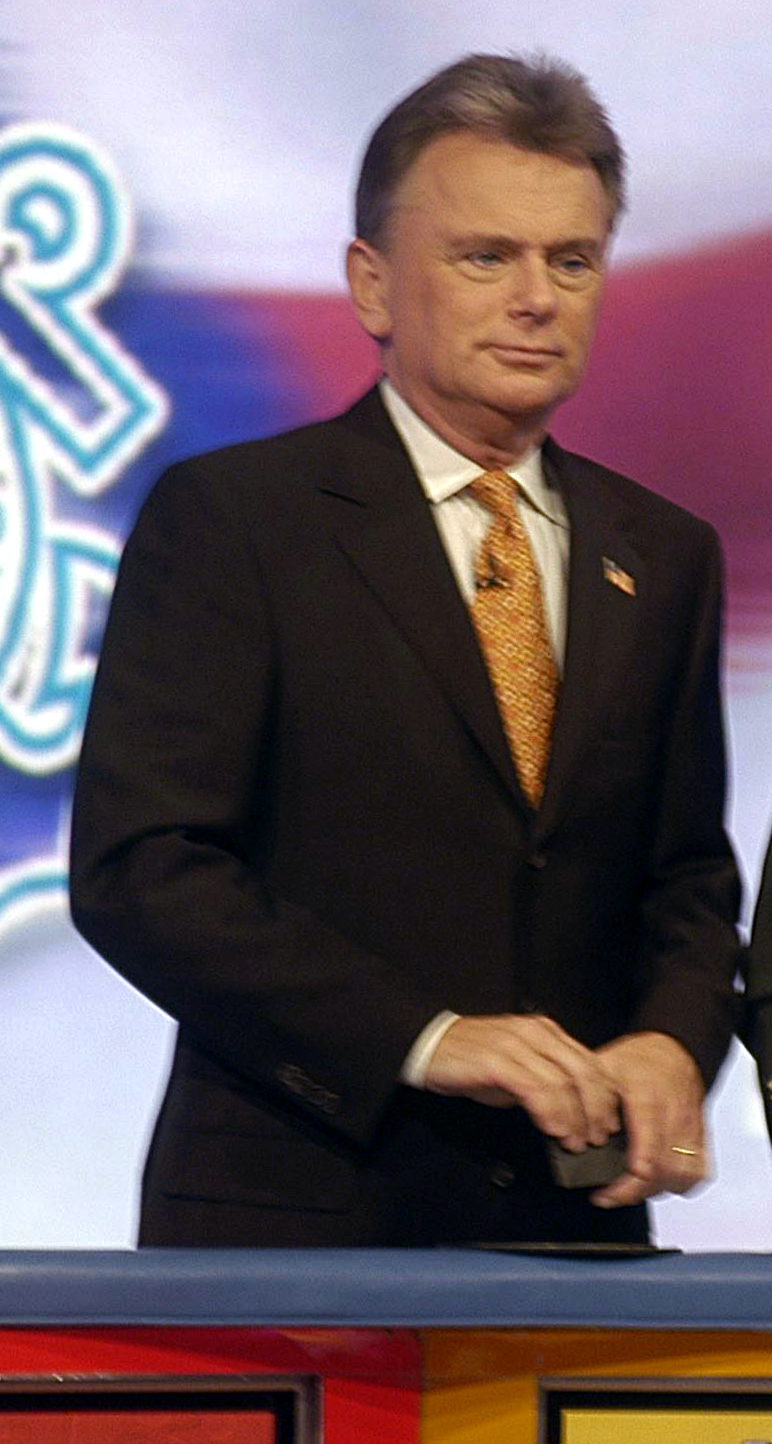
Pat Sajak has won three awards (out of fourteen nominations) for hosting Wheel of Fortune

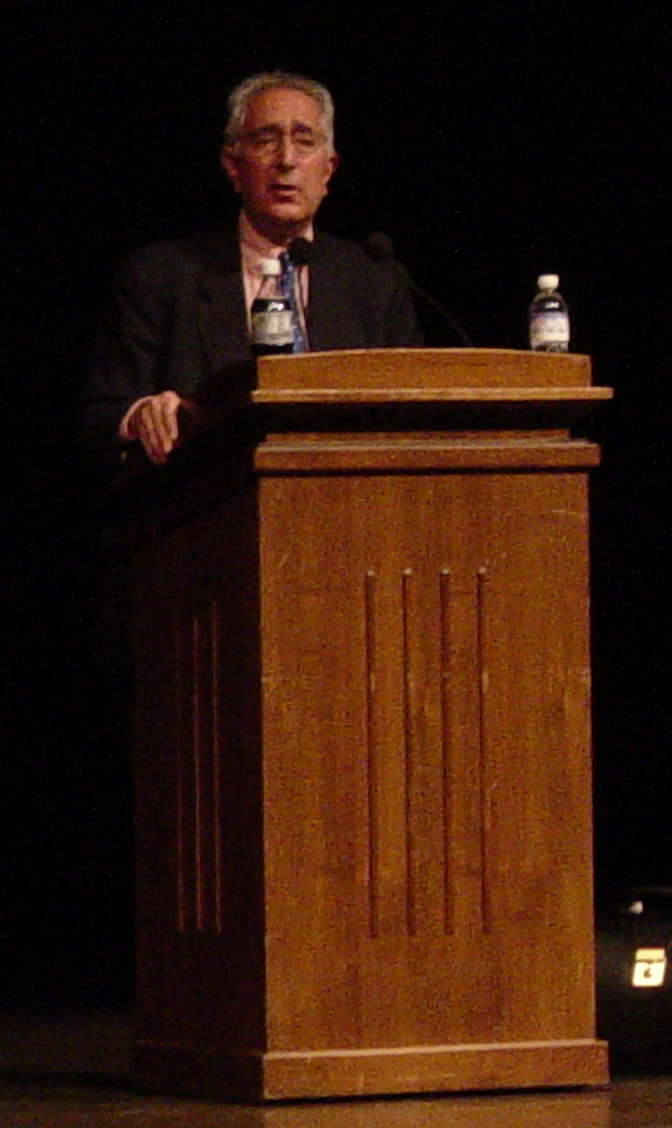
Ben Stein has won once in 1999 from four nominations for his hosting duty on Win Ben Stein's Money.

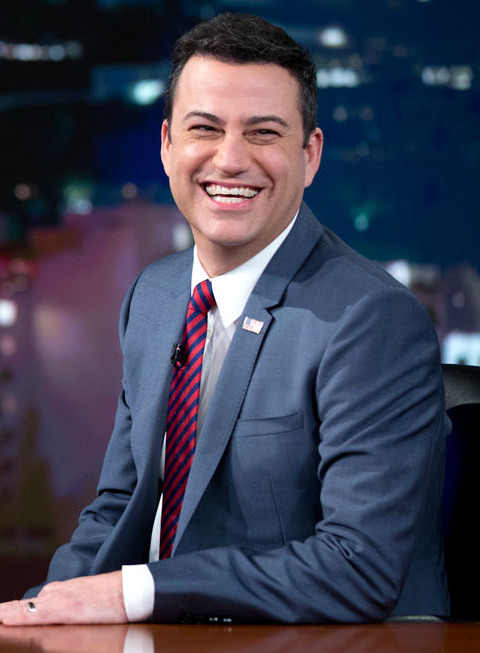
Jimmy Kimmel has won once in 1999 from two nominations, sharing both honors with co-host, Ben Stein on Win Ben Stein's Money.

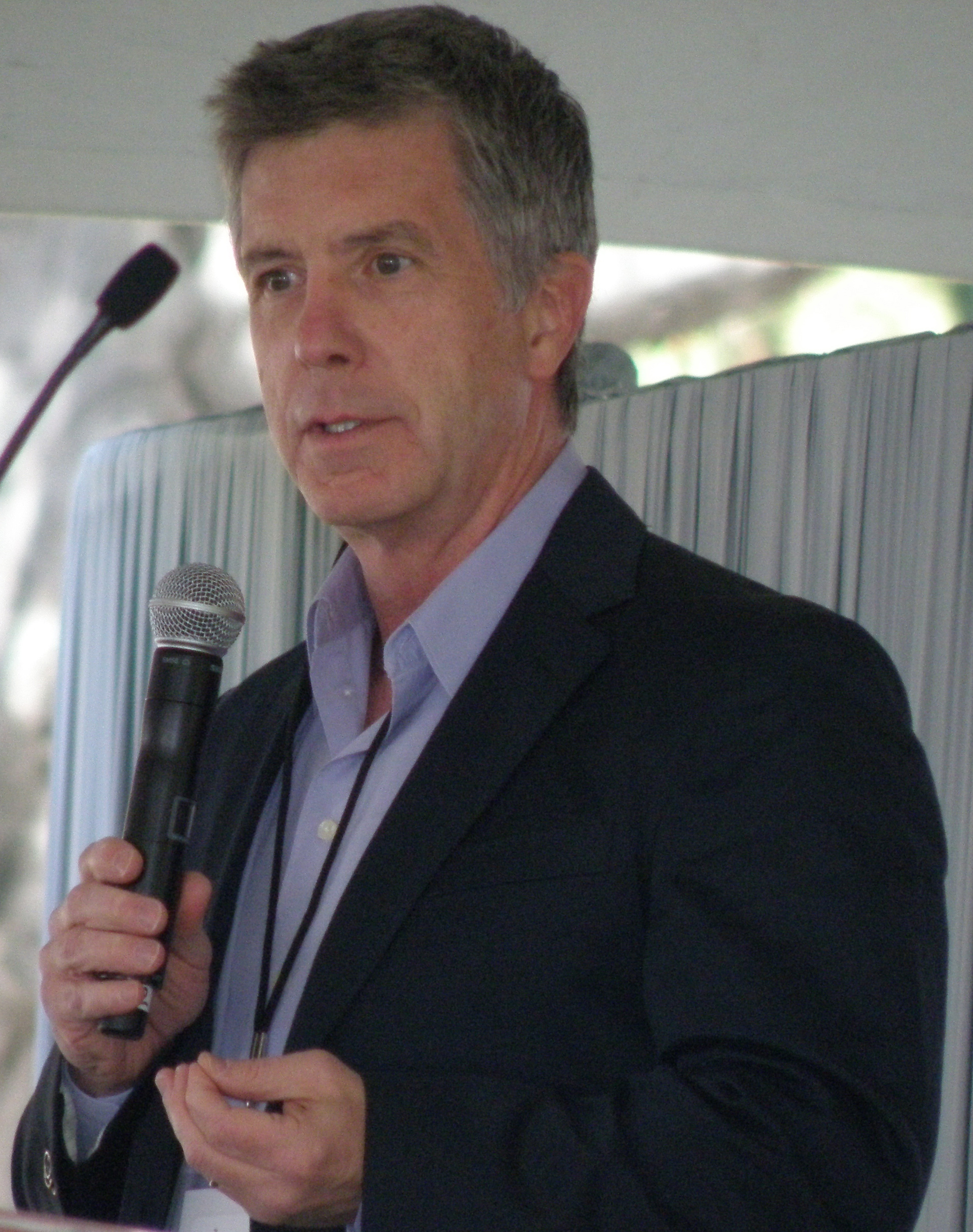
Tom Bergeron won in 2000 (tied with Bob Barker) and was nominated (2001 and 2003) for hosting Hollywood Squares.

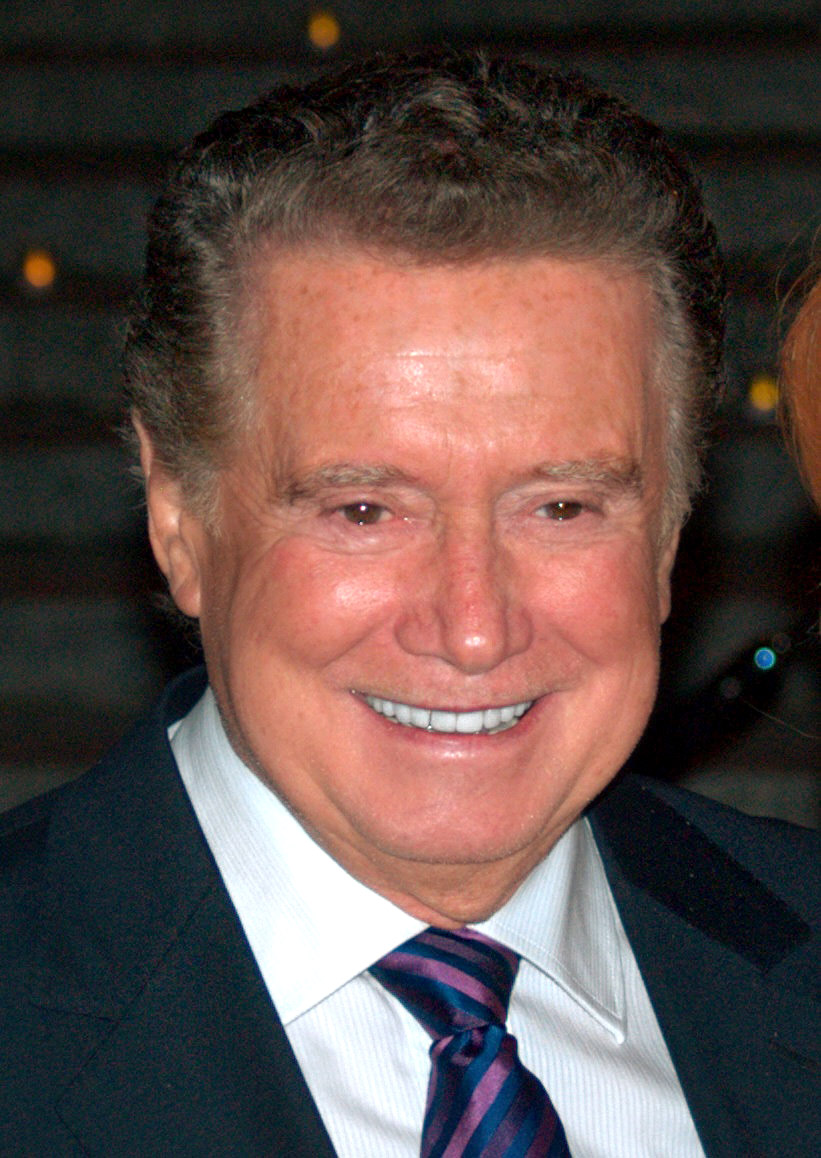
Regis Philbin received two consecutive nominations, winning in 2001 for hosting the ABC version of Who Wants to Be a Millionaire.

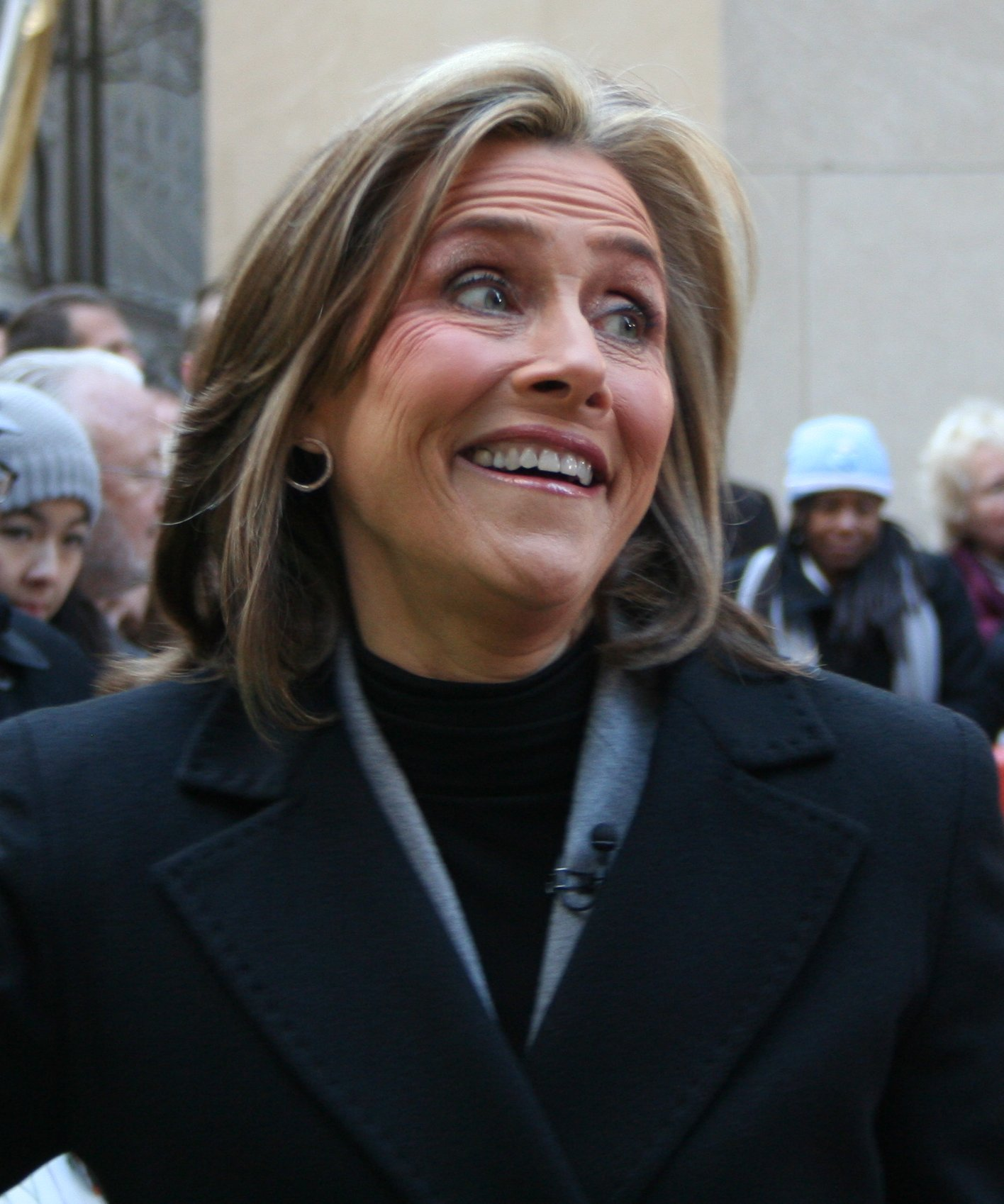
Meredith Vieira earned seven nominations (winning in 2005 and 2009) for hosting the syndicated version of Who Wants to Be a Millionaire.

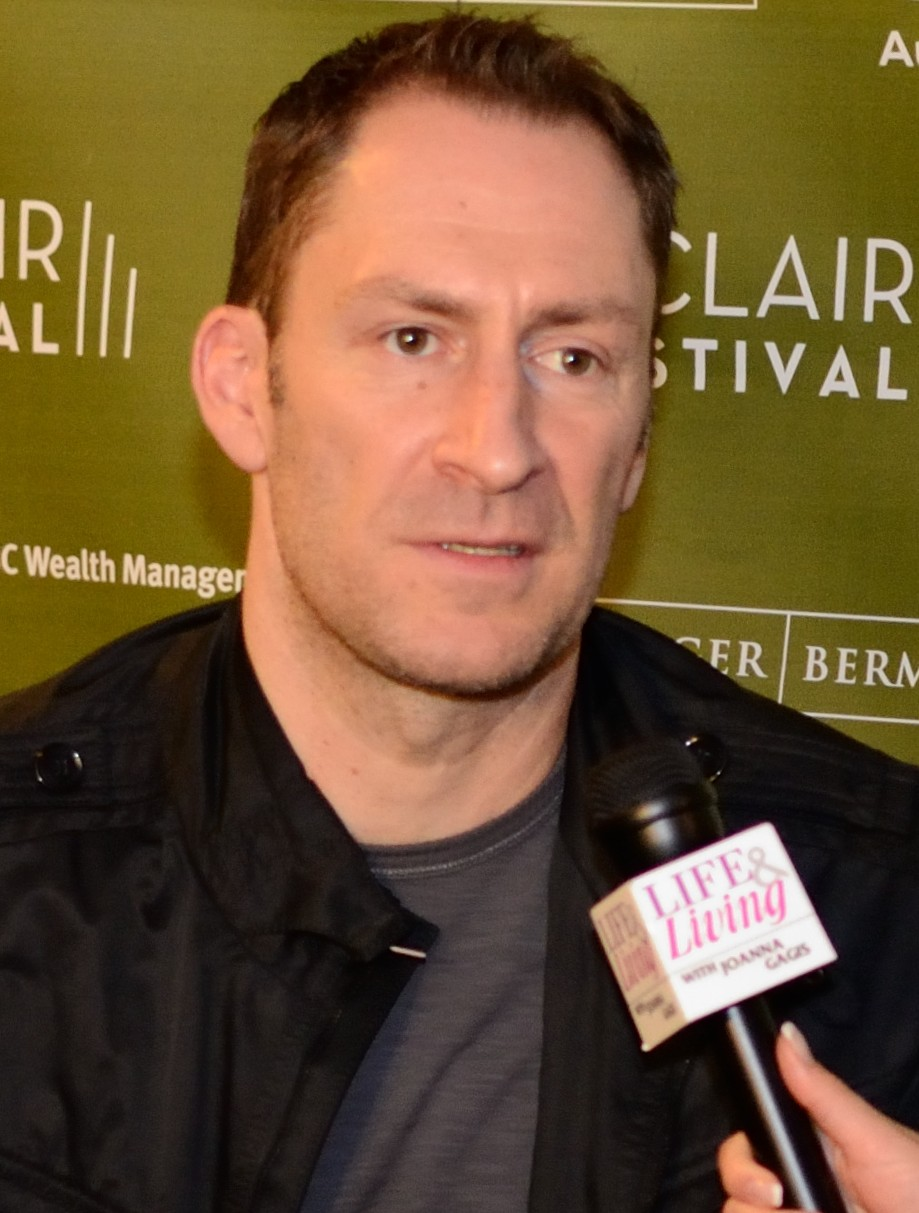
Ben Bailey won three times (2010, 2011 and 2013) for hosting Cash Cab

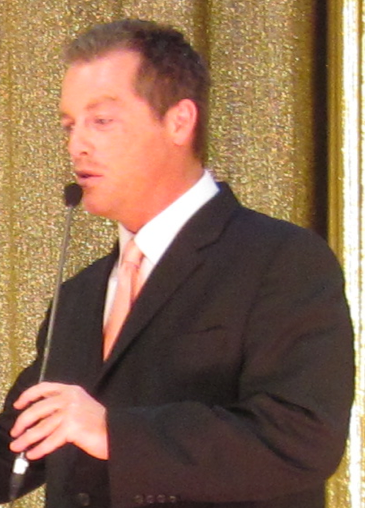
Todd Newton received four nominations, winning once in 2012 for hosting Family Game Night.

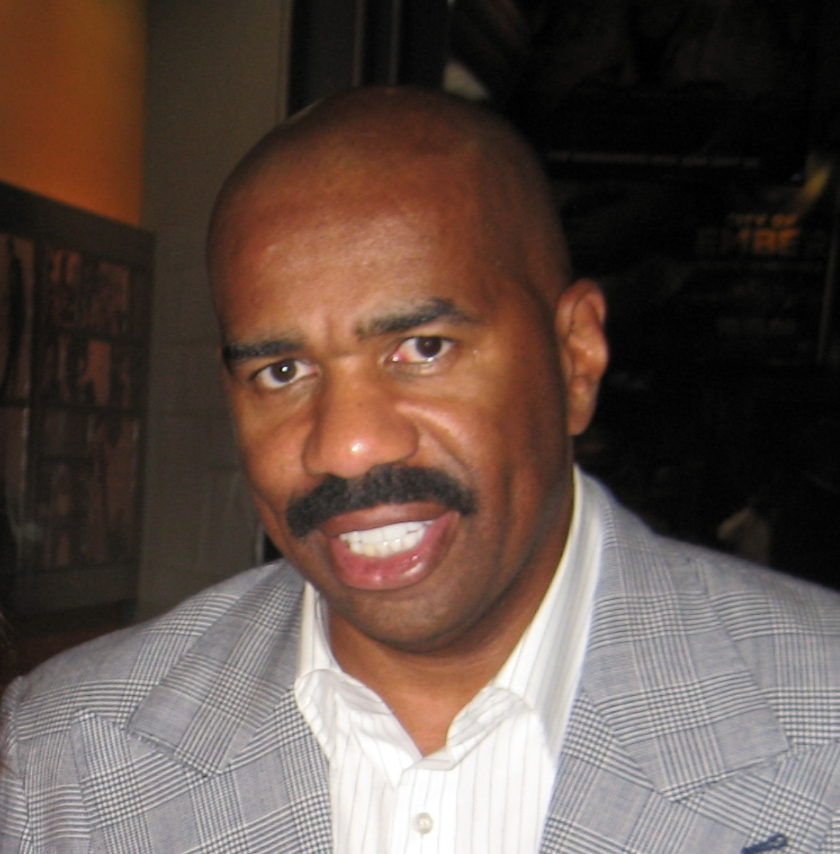
Steve Harvey received nine consecutive nominations, winning three times (2014, 2017 and 2022) for hosting Family Feud.

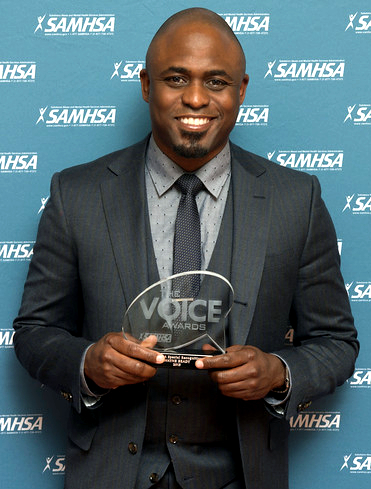
Wayne Brady received twelve nominations, winning in 2018, for hosting Let's Make a Deal.

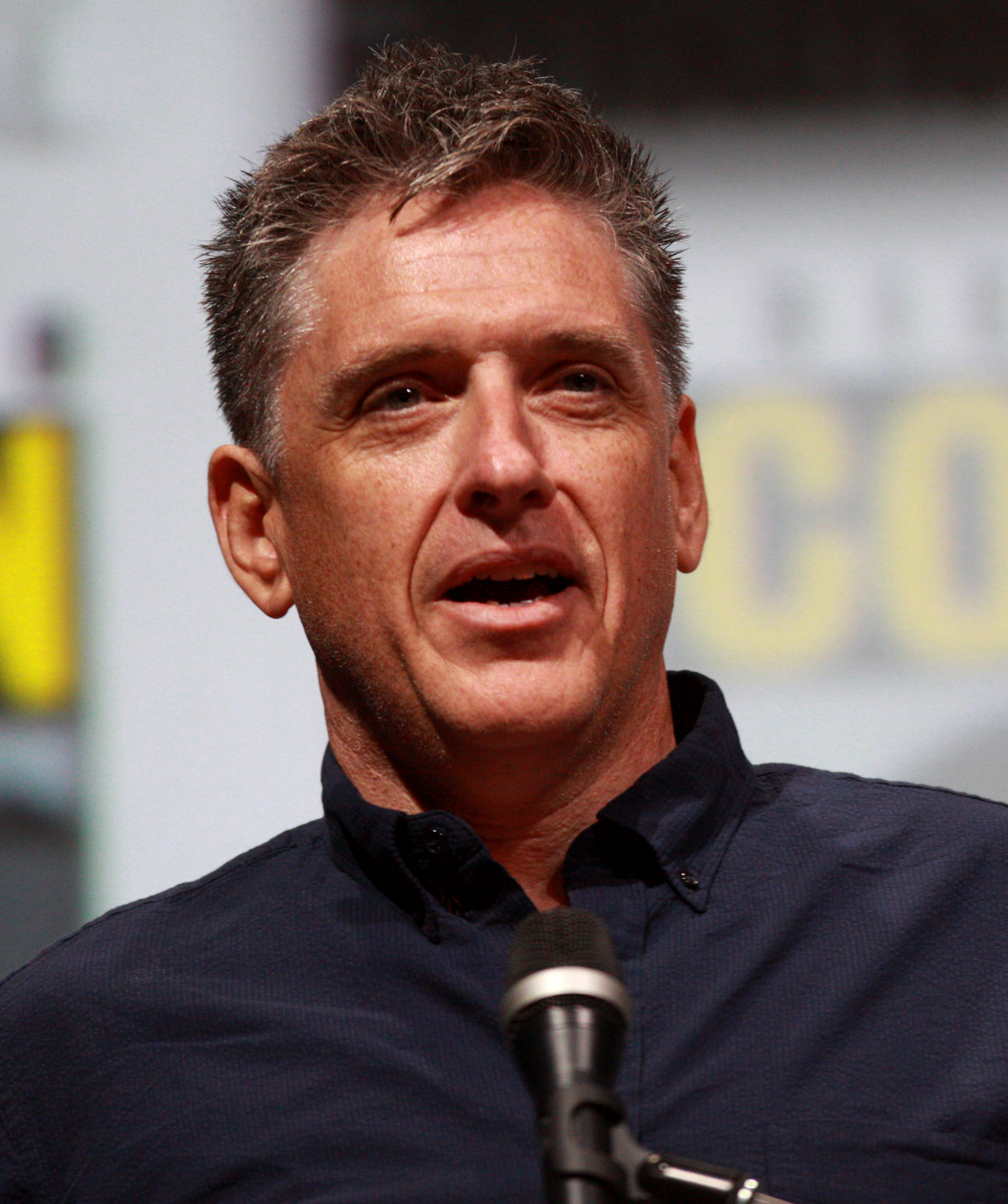
Craig Ferguson garnered two consecutive wins (2015 and 2016) out of three nominations for hosting Celebrity Name Game.

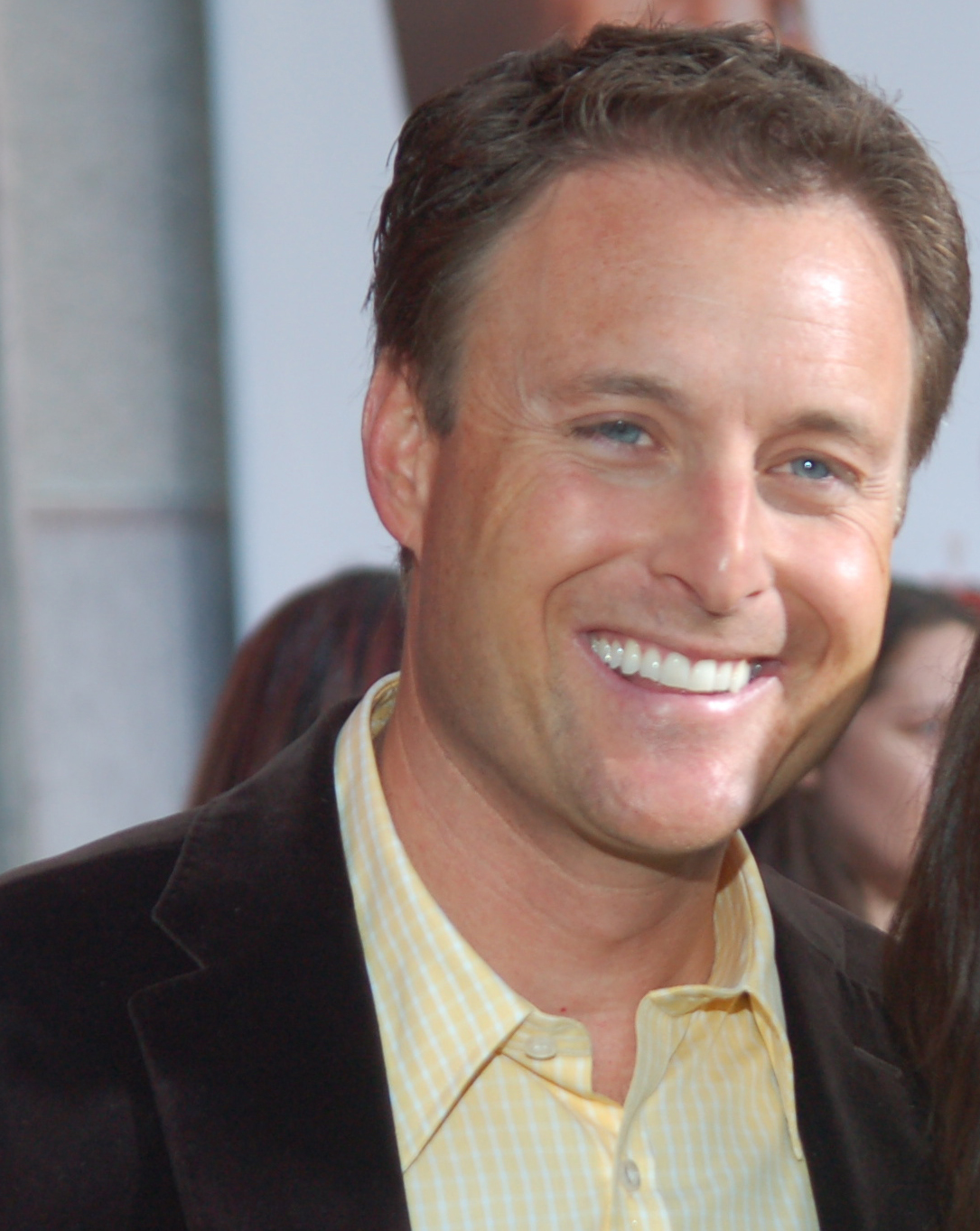
Chris Harrison garnered two consecutive nominations (2018 and 2019) for hosting Who Wants to Be a Millionaire.

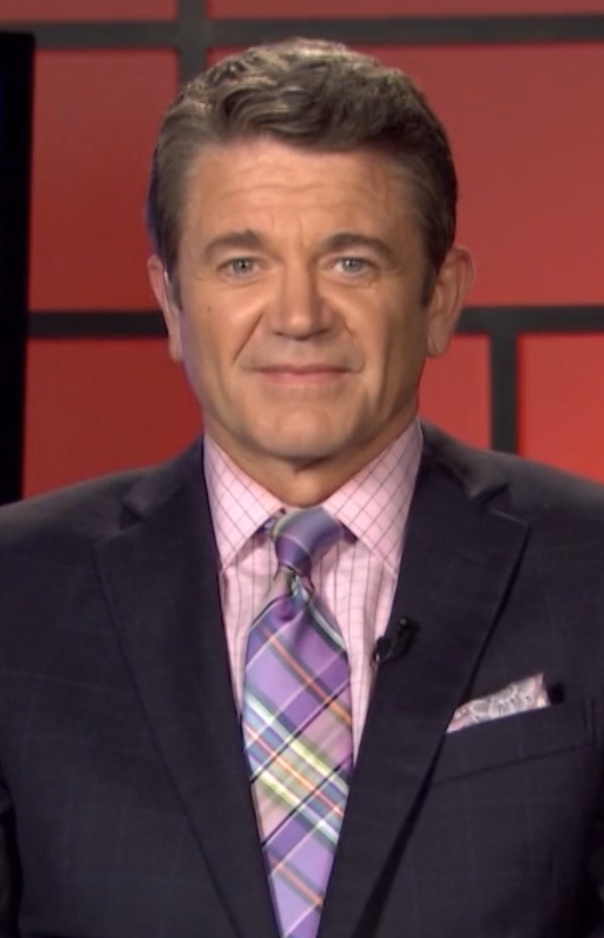
John Michael Higgins was nominated in 2019, for hosting duty on America Says

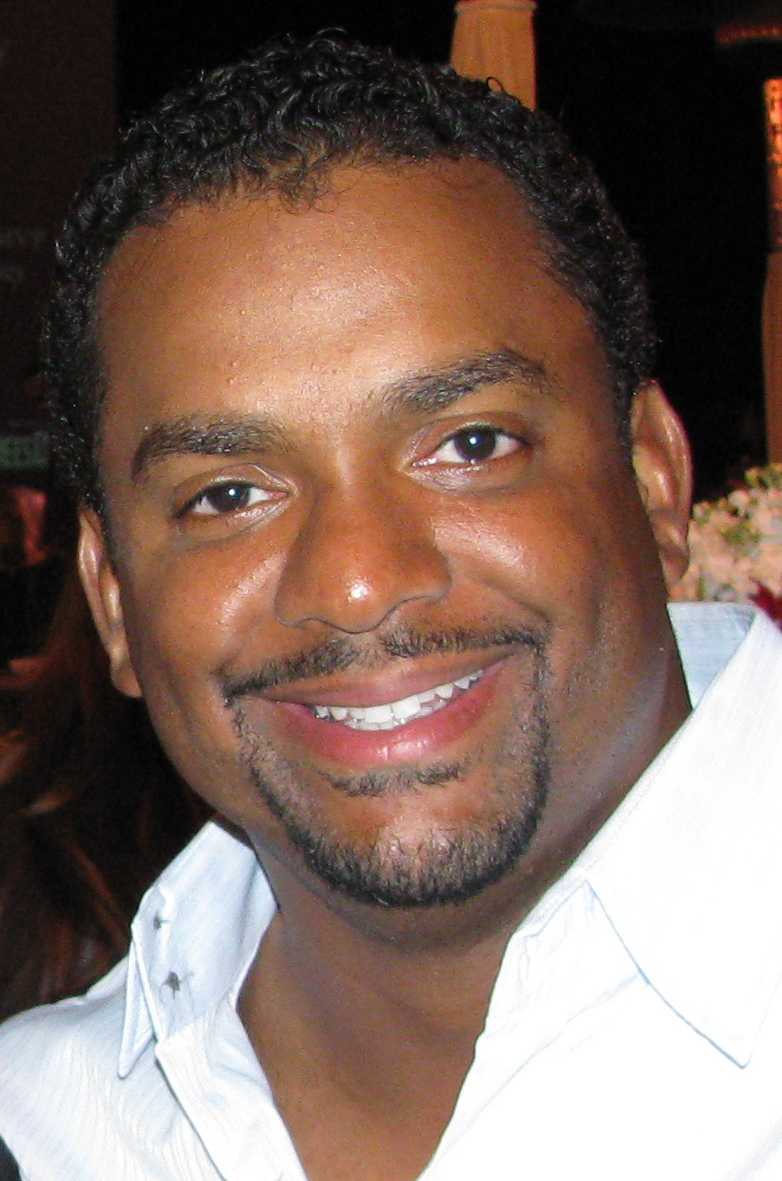
Alfonso Ribeiro was nominated in 2020 and 2021 for hosting duty on Catch 21.

=== 1970s ===
Year	Host(s)	Program	Network	Ref.
1974 (1st)
1974 (1st)	Peter Marshall ‡	Hollywood Squares	NBC	
1974 (1st)	Art Fleming	Jeopardy!	NBC	
1974 (1st)	Allen Ludden	Password	ABC	
1975 (2nd)
1975 (2nd)	Peter Marshall ‡	Hollywood Squares	NBC	
1975 (2nd)	Monty Hall	Let's Make a Deal	ABC	
1975 (2nd)	Gene Rayburn	Match Game	CBS	
1976 (3rd)
1976 (3rd)	Allen Ludden ‡	Password	ABC	
1976 (3rd)	Peter Marshall	Hollywood Squares	NBC	
1976 (3rd)	Geoff Edwards	Jackpot	NBC	
1977 (4th)
1977 (4th)	Bert Convy ‡	Tattletales	CBS	
1977 (4th)	Dick Clark	The $10,000 Pyramid	ABC	
1977 (4th)	Gene Rayburn	Match Game	CBS	
1978 (5th)
1978 (5th)	Richard Dawson ‡	Family Feud	ABC	
1978 (5th)	Dick Clark	The $20,000 Pyramid	ABC	
1978 (5th)	Gene Rayburn	Match Game	CBS	
1978 (5th)	Chuck Woolery & Susan Stafford	Wheel of Fortune	NBC	
1979 (6th)
1979 (6th)	Dick Clark ‡	The $20,000 Pyramid	ABC	
1979 (6th)	Bob Barker	The Price Is Right	CBS	
1979 (6th)	Peter Marshall	Hollywood Squares	NBC	

=== 1980s ===
Year	Host(s)	Program	Network	Ref.
1980 (7th)
1980 (7th)	Peter Marshall ‡	Hollywood Squares	NBC	
1980 (7th)	Richard Dawson	Family Feud	ABC	
1981 (8th)
1981 (8th)	Peter Marshall ‡	Hollywood Squares	NBC	
1981 (8th)	Dick Clark	The $20,000 Pyramid	ABC	
1981 (8th)	Richard Dawson	Family Feud	ABC	
1982 (9th)
1982 (9th)	Bob Barker ‡	The Price Is Right	CBS	
1982 (9th)	Bill Cullen	Blockbusters	NBC	
1982 (9th)	Richard Dawson	Family Feud	ABC	
1983 (10th)
1983 (10th)	Betty White ‡	Just Men!	NBC	
1983 (10th)	Dick Clark	The $25,000 Pyramid	CBS	
1983 (10th)	Richard Dawson	Family Feud	ABC	
1984 (11th)
1984 (11th)	Bob Barker ‡	The Price Is Right	CBS	
1984 (11th)	Richard Dawson	Family Feud	ABC	
1984 (11th)	Betty White	Just Men!	NBC	
1985 (12th)
1985 (12th)	Dick Clark ‡	The $25,000 Pyramid	CBS	
1985 (12th)	Bob Barker	The Price Is Right	CBS	
1985 (12th)	Bill Cullen	Celebrity Hot Potato	NBC	
1985 (12th)	Richard Dawson	Family Feud	ABC	
1985 (12th)	Pat Sajak	Wheel of Fortune	Syndicated	
1986 (13th)
1986 (13th)	Dick Clark ‡	The $25,000 Pyramid	CBS	
1986 (13th)	Bob Barker	The Price Is Right	CBS	
1986 (13th)	Pat Sajak	Wheel of Fortune	Syndicated	
1987 (14th)
1987 (14th)	Bob Barker ‡	The Price Is Right	CBS	
1987 (14th)	Dick Clark	The $25,000 Pyramid	CBS	
1987 (14th)	Pat Sajak	Wheel of Fortune	Syndicated	
1987 (14th)	Alex Trebek	Jeopardy!	Syndicated	
1988 (15th)
1988 (15th)	Bob Barker ‡	The Price Is Right	CBS	
1988 (15th)	Dick Clark	The $25,000 Pyramid	CBS	
1988 (15th)	Vicki Lawrence	Win, Lose or Draw	NBC	
1988 (15th)	Alex Trebek	Classic Concentration	NBC	
1989 (16th)
1989 (16th)	Alex Trebek ‡	Jeopardy!	Syndicated	
1989 (16th)	Dick Clark	The $25,000 Pyramid	Syndicated	
1989 (16th)	Vicki Lawrence Schultz	Win, Lose or Draw	NBC	
1989 (16th)	Pat Sajak	Wheel of Fortune	Syndicated	

=== 1990s ===
Year	Host(s)	Program	Network	Ref.
1990 (17th)
1990 (17th)	Bob Barker ‡	The Price Is Right	CBS	
1990 (17th)	Alex Trebek ‡	Jeopardy!	Syndicated	
1990 (17th)	Alex Trebek	Classic Concentration	NBC	
1991 (18th)
1991 (18th)	Bob Barker ‡	The Price Is Right	CBS	
1991 (18th)	Alex Trebek	Classic Concentration	NBC	
1991 (18th)	Alex Trebek	Jeopardy!	Syndicated	
1992 (19th)
1992 (19th)	Bob Barker ‡	The Price Is Right	CBS	
1992 (19th)	Dom DeLuise	Candid Camera	Syndicated	
1992 (19th)	Alex Trebek	Jeopardy!	Syndicated	
1993 (20th)
1993 (20th)	Pat Sajak ‡	Wheel of Fortune	Syndicated	
1993 (20th)	Bob Barker	The Price Is Right	CBS	
1993 (20th)	Ray Combs	The Family Feud Challenge	CBS	
1993 (20th)	Alex Trebek	Jeopardy!	Syndicated	
1994 (21st)
1994 (21st)	Bob Barker ‡	The Price Is Right	CBS	
1994 (21st)	Alex Trebek	Jeopardy!	Syndicated	
1995 (22nd)
1995 (22nd)	Bob Barker ‡	The Price Is Right	CBS	
1995 (22nd)	Alex Trebek	Jeopardy!	Syndicated	
1996 (23rd)
1996 (23rd)	Bob Barker ‡	The Price Is Right	CBS	
1996 (23rd)	Alex Trebek	Jeopardy!	Syndicated	
1997 (24th)
1997 (24th)	Pat Sajak ‡	Wheel of Fortune	Syndicated	
1997 (24th)	Bob Barker	The Price Is Right	CBS	
1997 (24th)	Al Roker	Remember This?	MSNBC	
1997 (24th)	Alex Trebek	Jeopardy!	Syndicated	
1998 (25th)
1998 (25th)	Pat Sajak ‡	Wheel of Fortune	Syndicated	
1998 (25th)	Bob Barker	The Price Is Right	CBS	
1998 (25th)	Alex Trebek	Jeopardy!	Syndicated	
1999 (26th)
1999 (26th)	Ben Stein & Jimmy Kimmel ‡	Win Ben Stein's Money	Comedy Central	
1999 (26th)	Bob Barker	The Price Is Right	CBS	
1999 (26th)	Tom Bergeron	Hollywood Squares	Syndicated	
1999 (26th)	Pat Sajak	Wheel of Fortune	Syndicated	
1999 (26th)	Alex Trebek	Jeopardy!	Syndicated	

=== 2000s ===
Year	Host(s)	Program	Network	Ref.
2000 (27th)
2000 (27th)	Bob Barker ‡	The Price Is Right	CBS	
2000 (27th)	Tom Bergeron ‡	Hollywood Squares	Syndicated	
2000 (27th)	Regis Philbin	Who Wants to Be a Millionaire	ABC	
2000 (27th)	Pat Sajak	Wheel of Fortune	Syndicated	
2000 (27th)	Alex Trebek	Jeopardy!	Syndicated	
2001 (28th)
2001 (28th)	Regis Philbin ‡	Who Wants to Be a Millionaire	ABC	
2001 (28th)	Bob Barker	The Price Is Right	CBS	
2001 (28th)	Tom Bergeron	Hollywood Squares	Syndicated	
2001 (28th)	Ben Stein & Jimmy Kimmel	Win Ben Stein's Money	Comedy Central	
2001 (28th)	Alex Trebek	Jeopardy!	Syndicated	
2002 (29th)
2002 (29th)	Bob Barker ‡	The Price Is Right	CBS	
2002 (29th)	Pat Sajak	Wheel of Fortune	Syndicated	
2002 (29th)	Ben Stein & Nancy Pimental	Win Ben Stein's Money	Comedy Central	
2002 (29th)	Alex Trebek	Jeopardy!	Syndicated	
2003 (30th)
2003 (30th)	Alex Trebek ‡	Jeopardy!	Syndicated	
2003 (30th)	Bob Barker	The Price Is Right	CBS	
2003 (30th)	Tom Bergeron	Hollywood Squares	Syndicated	
2003 (30th)	Donny Osmond	Pyramid	Syndicated	
2003 (30th)	Pat Sajak	Wheel of Fortune	Syndicated	
2003 (30th)	Ben Stein & Sal Iacono	Win Ben Stein's Money	Comedy Central	
2004 (31st)
2004 (31st)	Bob Barker ‡	The Price Is Right	CBS	
2004 (31st)	Alex Trebek	Jeopardy!	Syndicated	
2004 (31st)	Meredith Vieira	Who Wants to Be a Millionaire	Syndicated	
2005 (32nd)
2005 (32nd)	Meredith Vieira ‡	Who Wants to Be a Millionaire	Syndicated	
2005 (32nd)	Bob Barker	The Price Is Right	CBS	
2005 (32nd)	Alex Trebek	Jeopardy!	Syndicated	
2006 (33rd)
2006 (33rd)	Alex Trebek ‡	Jeopardy!	Syndicated	
2006 (33rd)	Meredith Vieira	Who Wants to Be a Millionaire	Syndicated	
2007 (34th)
2007 (34th)	Bob Barker ‡	The Price Is Right	CBS	
2007 (34th)	Ben Bailey	Cash Cab	Discovery Channel	
2007 (34th)	Pat Sajak	Wheel of Fortune	Syndicated	
2007 (34th)	Alex Trebek	Jeopardy!	Syndicated	
2007 (34th)	Meredith Vieira	Who Wants to Be a Millionaire	Syndicated	
2008 (35th)
2008 (35th)	Alex Trebek ‡	Jeopardy!	Syndicated	
2008 (35th)	Ben Bailey	Cash Cab	Discovery Channel	
2008 (35th)	Pat Sajak	Wheel of Fortune	Syndicated	
2009 (36th)
2009 (36th)	Meredith Vieira ‡	Who Wants to Be a Millionaire	Syndicated	
2009 (36th)	Ben Bailey	Cash Cab	Discovery Channel	
2009 (36th)	Howie Mandel	Deal or No Deal	NBC	
2009 (36th)	Alex Trebek	Jeopardy!	Syndicated	

=== 2010s ===
Year	Host(s)	Program	Network	Ref.
2010 (37th)
2010 (37th)	Ben Bailey ‡	Cash Cab	Discovery Channel	
2010 (37th)	Wayne Brady	Let's Make a Deal	CBS	
2010 (37th)	Pat Sajak	Wheel of Fortune	Syndicated	
2010 (37th)	Alex Trebek	Jeopardy!	Syndicated	
2010 (37th)	Carnie Wilson	The Newlywed Game	GSN	
2011 (38th)
2011 (38th)	Ben Bailey ‡	Cash Cab	Discovery Channel	
2011 (38th)	Wayne Brady	Let's Make a Deal	CBS	
2011 (38th)	Todd Newton	Family Game Night	The Hub	
2011 (38th)	Meredith Vieira	Who Wants to Be a Millionaire	Syndicated	
2012 (39th)
2012 (39th)	Todd Newton ‡	Family Game Night	The Hub	
2012 (39th)	Ben Bailey	Cash Cab	Discovery Channel	
2012 (39th)	Wayne Brady	Let's Make a Deal	CBS	
2012 (39th)	Meredith Vieira	Who Wants to Be a Millionaire	Syndicated	
2013 (40th)
2013 (40th)	Ben Bailey ‡	Cash Cab	Discovery Channel	
2013 (40th)	Wayne Brady	Let's Make a Deal	CBS	
2013 (40th)	Billy Eichner	Funny or Die's Billy on the Street	Fuse TV	
2013 (40th)	Steve Harvey	Family Feud	Syndicated	
2013 (40th)	Alex Trebek	Jeopardy!	Syndicated	
2014 (41st)
2014 (41st)	Steve Harvey ‡	Family Feud	Syndicated	
2014 (41st)	Wayne Brady	Let's Make a Deal	CBS	
2014 (41st)	Jeff Foxworthy	The American Bible Challenge	GSN	
2014 (41st)	Todd Newton	Family Game Night	Hub Network	
2015 (42nd)
2015 (42nd)	Craig Ferguson ‡	Celebrity Name Game	Syndicated	
2015 (42nd)	Steve Harvey	Family Feud	Syndicated	
2015 (42nd)	Todd Newton	Family Game Night	Hub Network	
2015 (42nd)	Pat Sajak	Wheel of Fortune	Syndicated	
2016 (43rd)
2016 (43rd)	Craig Ferguson ‡	Celebrity Name Game	Syndicated	
2016 (43rd)	Wayne Brady	Let's Make a Deal	CBS	
2016 (43rd)	Brooke Burns	The Chase	GSN	
2016 (43rd)	Billy Gardell	Monopoly Millionaires' Club	Syndicated	
2016 (43rd)	Steve Harvey	Family Feud	Syndicated	
2017 (44th)
2017 (44th)	Steve Harvey ‡	Family Feud	Syndicated	
2017 (44th)	Wayne Brady	Let's Make a Deal	CBS	
2017 (44th)	Craig Ferguson	Celebrity Name Game	Syndicated	
2017 (44th)	Pat Sajak	Wheel of Fortune	Syndicated	
2017 (44th)	Alex Trebek	Jeopardy!	Syndicated	
2018 (45th)
2018 (45th)	Wayne Brady ‡	Let's Make a Deal	CBS	
2018 (45th)	Chris Harrison	Who Wants to Be a Millionaire	Syndicated	
2018 (45th)	Steve Harvey	Family Feud	Syndicated	
2018 (45th)	Pat Sajak	Wheel of Fortune	Syndicated	
2018 (45th)	Alex Trebek	Jeopardy!	Syndicated	
2019 (46th)
2019 (46th)	Alex Trebek ‡	Jeopardy!	Syndicated	
2019 (46th)	Wayne Brady	Let's Make a Deal	CBS	
2019 (46th)	Chris Harrison	Who Wants to Be a Millionaire	Syndicated	
2019 (46th)	John Michael Higgins	America Says	GSN	
2019 (46th)	Pat Sajak	Wheel of Fortune	Syndicated	

=== 2020s ===
Year	Host(s)	Program	Network	Ref.
2020 (47th)
2020 (47th)	Alex Trebek ‡	Jeopardy!	Syndicated	
2020 (47th)	Wayne Brady	Let's Make a Deal	CBS	
2020 (47th)	Steve Harvey	Family Feud	Syndicated	
2020 (47th)	Alfonso Ribeiro	Catch 21	GSN	
2020 (47th)	Pat Sajak	Wheel of Fortune	Syndicated	
2021 (48th)
2021 (48th)	Alex Trebek † (posthumous)	Jeopardy!	Syndicated	
2021 (48th)	Wayne Brady	Let's Make a Deal	CBS	
2021 (48th)	Steve Harvey	Family Feud	Syndicated	
2021 (48th)	Alfonso Ribeiro	Catch 21	GSN	
2021 (48th)	Pat Sajak	Wheel of Fortune	Syndicated	
2022 (49th)
2022 (49th)	Steve Harvey ‡	Family Feud	Syndicated	
2022 (49th)	Wayne Brady	Let's Make a Deal	CBS	
2022 (49th)	Leah Remini	People Puzzler	GSN	
2022 (49th)	Pat Sajak	Celebrity Wheel of Fortune	ABC	
2022 (49th)	Pat Sajak	Wheel of Fortune	Syndicated	

== Hosts with multiple wins and nominations ==
The following individuals received two or more Game Show Host awards:

Wins	Host
14	Bob Barker
8	Alex Trebek
4	Peter Marshall
3	Ben Bailey
3	Dick Clark
3	Pat Sajak
3	Steve Harvey
2	Craig Ferguson
2	Meredith Vieira

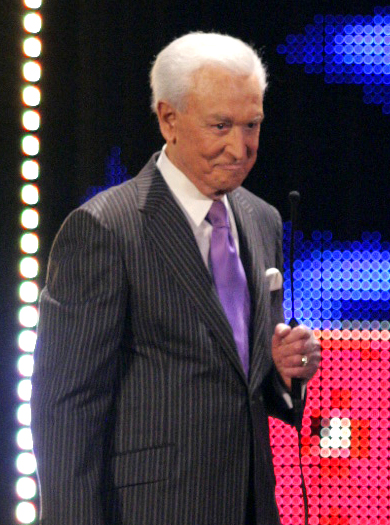
Bob Barker has the most wins in this category for his hosting duty on The Price Is Right.

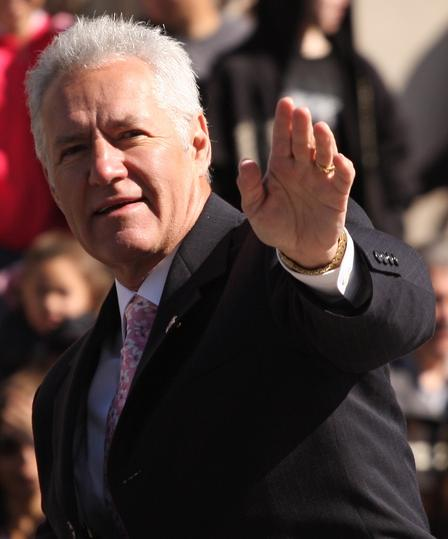
Alex Trebek has been nominated on 32 occasions, receiving eight wins.

The following individuals received two or more Game Show Host nominations:

Nominations	Host
32	Alex Trebek
23	Bob Barker
21	Pat Sajak
12	Wayne Brady
10	Dick Clark
9	Steve Harvey
7	Ben Bailey
7	Richard Dawson
7	Meredith Vieira
6	Peter Marshall
4	Tom Bergeron
4	Ben Stein
3	Gene Rayburn
3	Craig Ferguson
3	Todd Newton
2	Alfonso Ribeiro
2	Bill Cullen
2	Chris Harrison
2	Jimmy Kimmel
2	Vicki Lawrence
2	Allen Ludden
2	Regis Philbin
2	Betty White

== See also ==
- Daytime Emmy Award
- Outstanding Game Show
- Primetime Emmy Award for Outstanding Host for a Game Show
