= Ultimatum (The Office) =

- The Office episode
- Episode no.: Season 7 Episode 13
- Directed by: David Rogers
- Written by: Carrie Kemper
- Cinematography by: Matt Sohn
- Editing by: David Rogers
- Production code: 713
- Original air date: January 20, 2011

Episode chronology
← Previous "Classy Christmas"	Next → "The Seminar"
- The Office (American season 7)

"Ultimatum" is the thirteenth episode of the seventh season of the American comedy television series The Office, and the show's 139th episode overall. Written by Carrie Kemper, and directed by David Rogers, the episode first aired in the United States on January 20, 2011 on NBC.

The series depicts the everyday lives of office employees at the Scranton, Pennsylvania branch of the fictitious Dunder Mifflin Paper Company. In the episode, Michael Scott (Steve Carell) attempts to court Holly Flax (Amy Ryan) after her relationship with A.J. (Rob Huebel) seemingly ends as a result of an ultimatum that he propose to her by the end of the year. Meanwhile, Pam Halpert (Jenna Fischer) starts a New Year's resolution initiative at the office, but her coworkers criticize each other's resolutions or their failure to keep them.

The episode achieved a viewership of 8.29 million during its initial airing in the United States, according to Nielsen Media Research. Jim Halpert is only seen in the episode's cold open, and does not appear in the rest of the episode.

== Synopsis ==
Michael Scott anticipates news regarding the status of Holly Flax and A.J.'s relationship, after Holly's ultimatum that A.J. propose to her by the end of the year. To prepare for either outcome, Michael fills a "happy box" with celebration treats and a "sad box" with consolation items, as well as two videos of himself to be used to calm himself down should he get too excited or too depressed.

Pam Halpert, inspired by the cheerful office administrator from Vance Refrigeration, puts up a New Year's Resolution board in the office so everyone can post their resolutions. These include Kevin Malone resolving to eat more vegetables, Ryan Howard resolving to "live life like it's an art project," and Creed Bratton resolving to do a cartwheel. When Dwight Schrute reveals his resolution is to "meet a loose woman", he goes out on the town along with fellow single men Darryl Philbin and Andy Bernard, in the hopes of meeting women. Darryl suggests they try a bookstore, actually wanting to fulfill his own resolution to "read more" by purchasing an e-book reader.

When Michael sees no ring on Holly's finger, he is ecstatic, and launches into celebration in his office. When he approaches Holly to talk, however, Holly receives a phone call from A.J., during which she tells him she loves him. Michael finds out later, through Phyllis Vance and Erin Hannon, that Holly caved on the ultimatum and that she and A.J. are still together. Upset, Michael interrupts Pam's resolution-board meeting to chastise his employees for giving up on their resolutions, taking out his frustration on Kevin by force-feeding him broccoli as well as berating Creed for not attempting a cartwheel. Holly sees the parallel Michael is making between these abandoned resolutions and her own abandoned ultimatum, and leaves the room, visibly upset. Michael attempts to apologize to Holly, but she declines to talk. Michael has her join Kevin and Creed in his office so he can apologize to the two of them, simultaneously apologizing to Holly indirectly. Holly later tells A.J. that she wants to take a break from their relationship, at least until she returns to Nashua.

Following Michael's outburst, Kevin defacing Ryan's resolution by turning "art" into "fart", and Erin unintentionally angering Creed by doing a cartwheel, Pam tosses the resolution board into a dumpster, saying she has learned her lesson.

== Production ==
The episode was written by Carrie Kemper, the sister of cast member Ellie Kemper, her first writing credit on the series. It was directed by David Rogers, his third directing credit; Rogers also serves as an editor for the series.

The parking lot, bookstore, and rollerskating rink scenes were all shot on location in Northridge, Los Angeles in a single day, requiring an exceptional amount of moving around for the film crew. The bookstore was a Borders outlet, and the rollerskating rink was Skateland. There was a strip club across the parking lot from Skateland in real life, but it did not look obviously like a strip club from the outside, so the production crew acquired permission from the owners to redesign the club's front for the filming. The owners liked the redesign so much that they kept it up after the episode was wrapped.

The Office's prop master, Phil Shea, had the actors all write their own resolution cards so that the different handwritings would be authentic.

The producers paid $40,000 in licensing fees for the use of "My Life Would Suck Without You" by Kelly Clarkson and $50,000 for the use of "Ants Marching" by Dave Matthews Band; this expended the entire available budget for music for the episode, so they had to use a public domain song for the scene with Dwight, Darryl, and Andy all skating together.

Jim is only present during the cold open. He is then absent without explanation for the rest of the episode. In a deleted scene, his voice is heard when he talks to Pam on the phone as he is driving to make a sale. In real life, John Krasinski was filming Big Miracle in Alaska during filming of the episode. The cold open was filmed before he left for Alaska, while the phone call with Pam was filmed during the main shoot, and Krasinski's voice-over added on after he returned.

While filming the final scene of the episode, Creed Bratton was dissatisfied with his first cartwheel, and asked for another take. However, the producers thought Creed doing a partially botched cartwheel made the scene funnier, so they used the first take instead.

== Reception ==
In its original American broadcast on January 20, 2011, "Ultimatum" was viewed by an estimated 8.29 million viewers and received a 4.5 rating/12% share among adults between the ages of 18 and 49, reaching a season-high for the demo and increasing in more than a million viewers from the previous episode. In Canada, the episode was watched by 212,000 viewers, the lowest watched program of the night.
