= Alex Trebek =

Canadian-American TV personality (1940–2020)

Alex Trebek OC
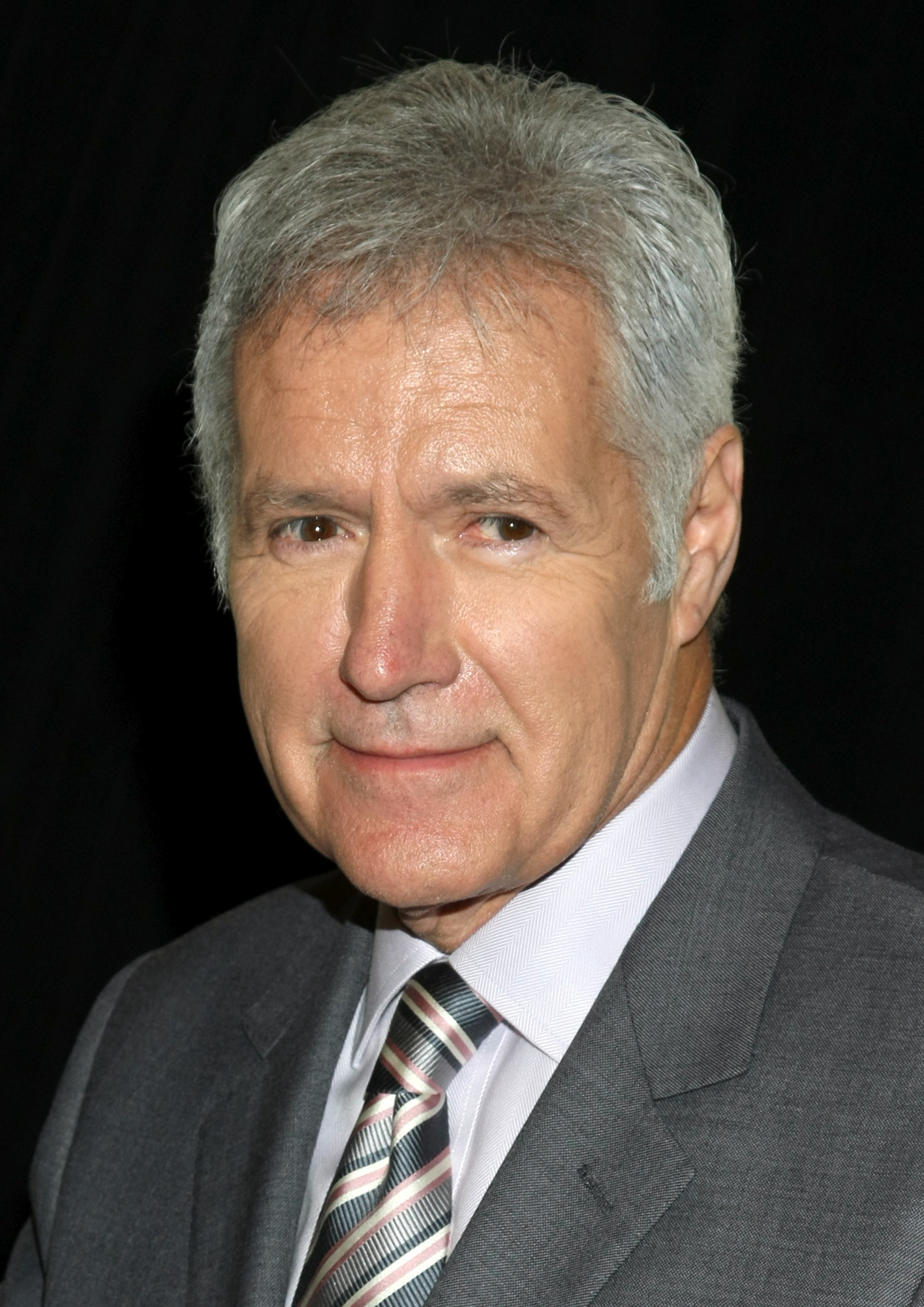
- Trebek in 2012
- Born: George Alexander Trebek; July 22, 1940; Sudbury, Ontario, Canada
- Died: November 8, 2020 (aged 80); Los Angeles, California, U.S.
- Citizenship: Canada; United States (from 1998)
- Education: University of Ottawa
- Occupations: Television personality; game show host
- Years active: 1961–2020
- Known for: Hosting Jeopardy! (1984–2020) (Note: Five episodes aired posthumously in the first full week of January 2021.)
- Spouses: Elaine Howard (m. 1974; div. 1981); Jean Currivan (m. 1990)
- Children: 3 (Note: 2 biological, 1 adopted.)

George Alexander Trebek (/trəˈbɛk/ trə-BECK; July 22, 1940 – November 8, 2020) was a Canadian and American game show host and television personality. Regarded as a pop culture icon, he was best known for hosting the syndicated quiz show Jeopardy! for 37 seasons from its revival in 1984 until his death in 2020. Trebek also hosted a number of other game shows, including The Wizard of Odds, Double Dare, High Rollers, Battlestars, Classic Concentration, and To Tell the Truth. He made appearances, usually as himself, in numerous films and television series.

A native of Canada, Trebek became a naturalized American citizen in 1998. For his work on Jeopardy!, Trebek received the Daytime Emmy Award for Outstanding Game Show Host eight times. He died on November 8, 2020, at the age of 80, after 20 months with stage IV pancreatic cancer. At the time of his death, Trebek had been contracted to host Jeopardy! until 2022.

== Early life ==
George Alexander Trebek was born on July 22, 1940, in Sudbury, Ontario, Canada, the son of George Edward Trebek (né Terebeychuk, Ukrainian: Теребейчук), a chef who had emigrated from Ukraine as a child (and spent a portion of his formative years in Japan) and Lucille Marie Lagacé (April 14, 1921 – 2016), a Franco-Ontarian. Trebek's second nickname, Sai, originated from his father's time in Japan. Trebek had roots in Renfrew County, Ontario, where his maternal grandmother was born in Mount St. Patrick near Renfrew. Trebek grew up in a bilingual French-English household. He was almost expelled from boarding school. Shortly afterwards, Trebek attended a military college in Quebec, but dropped out when he was asked to shave his head. Trebek's first job at age 13 was as a bellhop at the hotel where his father worked as a chef. Trebek attended Sudbury High School and the University of Ottawa. He graduated from the University of Ottawa with a degree in philosophy in 1961. While a university student, Trebek was a member of the English Debating Society. At the time, he was interested in a broadcast news career.

== Career ==
=== CBC ===
Before completing his degree, Trebek began his career in 1961 working for the Canadian Broadcasting Corporation. According to Trebek, "I went to school in the mornings and worked at nights; I did everything, at one time replacing every announcer in every possible job." He would eventually read the CBC national radio news and cover a wide range of special events for CBC Radio and CBC Television, including curling and horse racing.

Trebek's first hosting job was on a Canadian music program called Music Hop in 1963. In 1966, he hosted a high school quiz show called Reach for the Top. From 1967 to 1970, Trebek was a host for the CBC, introducing classical music programs including performances by Glenn Gould. For one or two seasons, he hosted a weekly skating program. Starting on April 1, 1969, Trebek also hosted Strategy, a weekday afternoon game show. From 1971 until the end of 1972, he hosted I'm Here Til 9, the local morning drive radio show on CBC Toronto.

In 1971, Trebek was one of several to have been shortlisted to succeed Ward Cornell as host of Hockey Night in Canada. Although Trebek was the preferred choice of executive producer Ralph Mellanby, based on his audition and other CBC roles, Mellanby stated in 2020 that he ultimately chose Dave Hodge instead, because his boss did not want someone with a mustache to host Hockey Night.

=== Game shows ===
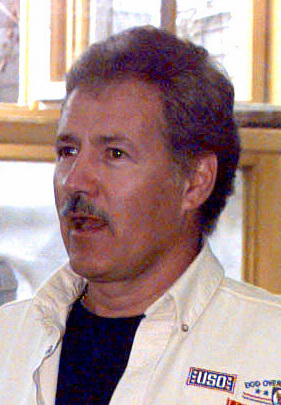
Trebek in 1996

In 1973, Trebek moved to the United States and worked for NBC as host of a new game show, The Wizard of Odds. A year later, Trebek hosted the popular Merrill Heatter-Bob Quigley game show High Rollers, which had two incarnations on NBC (1974–76 and 1978–80) and an accompanying syndicated season (1975–76). In between stints as host of High Rollers, Trebek hosted the short-lived CBS game show Double Dare (not to be confused with the 1986 Nickelodeon game show of the same name). Double Dare turned out to be Trebek's only game show with the CBS network (he returned there in 1994 to host the Pillsbury Bake-Off until 1998), and the first show he hosted for what was then Mark Goodson-Bill Todman Productions, as well as the second season of the syndicated series The $128,000 Question, which was recorded in Toronto.

Since the second incarnation of High Rollers premiered while The $128,000 Question was still airing and taping episodes, Trebek became one of two hosts to emcee shows in both the United States and Canada, joining Jim Perry, who was hosting Definition and Headline Hunters in Canada and Card Sharks, which coincidentally premiered the same day as High Rollers in 1978 in the United States. Trebek's francophone side was put on display in 1978, in a special bilingual edition of Reach for the Top and its Radio-Canada equivalent, Génies en herbe. In this show, Trebek alternated smoothly between French and English throughout.

Like other hosts of the day, Trebek made several guest appearances as a panelist or player on other shows. One of his guest appearances was on a special week of NBC's Card Sharks in 1980. Trebek and several other game show hosts (Allen Ludden, Bill Cullen, Wink Martindale, Jack Clark, Tom Kennedy, Gene Rayburn, and Jim Lange) competed in a three-week-long round-robin tournament for charity. Trebek won the tournament, defeating Cullen in the finals. He also appeared as a celebrity teammate on the NBC game show The Magnificent Marble Machine in 1975, and the Tom Kennedy-hosted NBC word game To Say the Least in 1978. Both of those shows were produced by Merrill Heatter-Bob Quigley Productions, which also produced High Rollers, the show Trebek was hosting during both of those guest appearances. Trebek also was a contestant on Celebrity Bowling in 1976, teamed with Jim McKrell. The duo won their match against Dick Gautier and Scatman Crothers.

After High Rollers was cancelled in 1980, Trebek moved on to Battlestars for NBC. The series debuted in October 1981 and was cancelled in April 1982 after only six months on the air. In September 1981, Trebek took the helm of the syndicated Pitfall, which taped in Vancouver and forced him to commute, as Trebek had done while hosting High Rollers and The $128,000 Question in 1978. Pitfall was cancelled after its production company, Catalena Productions, went bankrupt. As a result, Trebek was never paid for that series. After both series ended, he hosted a revival of Battlestars called The New Battlestars that ended after 13 weeks, then shot a series of pilots for other series for producer Merrill Heatter, for whom he had worked hosting High Rollers and Battlestars, and Merv Griffin. The Heatter pilots were Malcolm, an NBC-ordered pilot featuring Trebek with an animated character as his co-host, and Lucky Numbers, an attempt at a revival of High Rollers that failed to sell. For Griffin, (who was ultimately encouraged to hire Trebek by Lucille Ball) he shot two pilots for a revival of Jeopardy! when original host Art Fleming (a friend of Trebek's) declined to return to the role owing to creative differences. This revival sold, and Trebek began hosting it in 1984 and remained the host until his death in November 2020. Trebek's final episode hosting Jeopardy! was to air on Christmas Day 2020; however, Sony announced on November 23, 2020, that the air dates of Trebek's final week would be postponed, with episodes scheduled for the week of December 21–25 being postponed to January 4–8, 2021, due to the delay caused by the cancellation of most November production dates and pre-emptions caused by holiday week specials and shorts.

Following Trebek's death, a series of guest hosts filled in for Trebek for the remainder of season 37 of Jeopardy! (his final season). On July 27, 2022, it was announced that Mayim Bialik and Ken Jennings would succeed Trebek as the permanent hosts of Jeopardy! after alternating in multi-week stints for the remainder of the show's 38th season after Mike Richards (the show's then-executive producer who briefly succeeded Trebek as host of the program) was let go after taping a week's worth of episodes after various controversies came to light.

In 1987, while still hosting Jeopardy!, Trebek returned to daytime television as host of NBC's Classic Concentration, his second show for Mark Goodson. Trebek hosted both shows simultaneously until September 20, 1991, when Classic Concentration aired its final first-run episode (NBC would air repeats until 1993). In 1991, he made broadcast history by becoming the first person to host three American game shows at the same time, earning this distinction on February 4, 1991, when Trebek took over from Lynn Swann as host of NBC's To Tell the Truth for Goodson-Todman, which Trebek hosted until the end of the series' run on May 31, 1991.

External videos
- Presentation by Trebek to the National Press Club, November 5, 1997, C-SPAN

In 1994, Trebek returned to the CBS network for the first time since hosting Double Dare to host the Pillsbury Bake-Off, which he hosted until 1998. Trebek and Pat Sajak, host of Wheel of Fortune, traded places on April Fools' Day 1997. Pat Sajak hosted Jeopardy! and Trebek hosted Wheel of Fortune with Sajak's wife, Lesly, as Trebek's co-host. Sajak and Wheel of Fortune co-host Vanna White played contestants at the wheel, with winnings going toward charities. Trebek appeared on Celebrity Poker Showdown in 2005 and came in second place in his qualifying game, losing to Cheryl Hines.

On June 24, 2018, Trebek returned as a panelist on the ABC revival of To Tell the Truth. He hosted a Jeopardy! primetime special event titled The Greatest of All Time on ABC in January 2020, pitting the highest money winners in the show's history, Brad Rutter, Ken Jennings, and James Holzhauer, against each other.

=== Other appearances ===
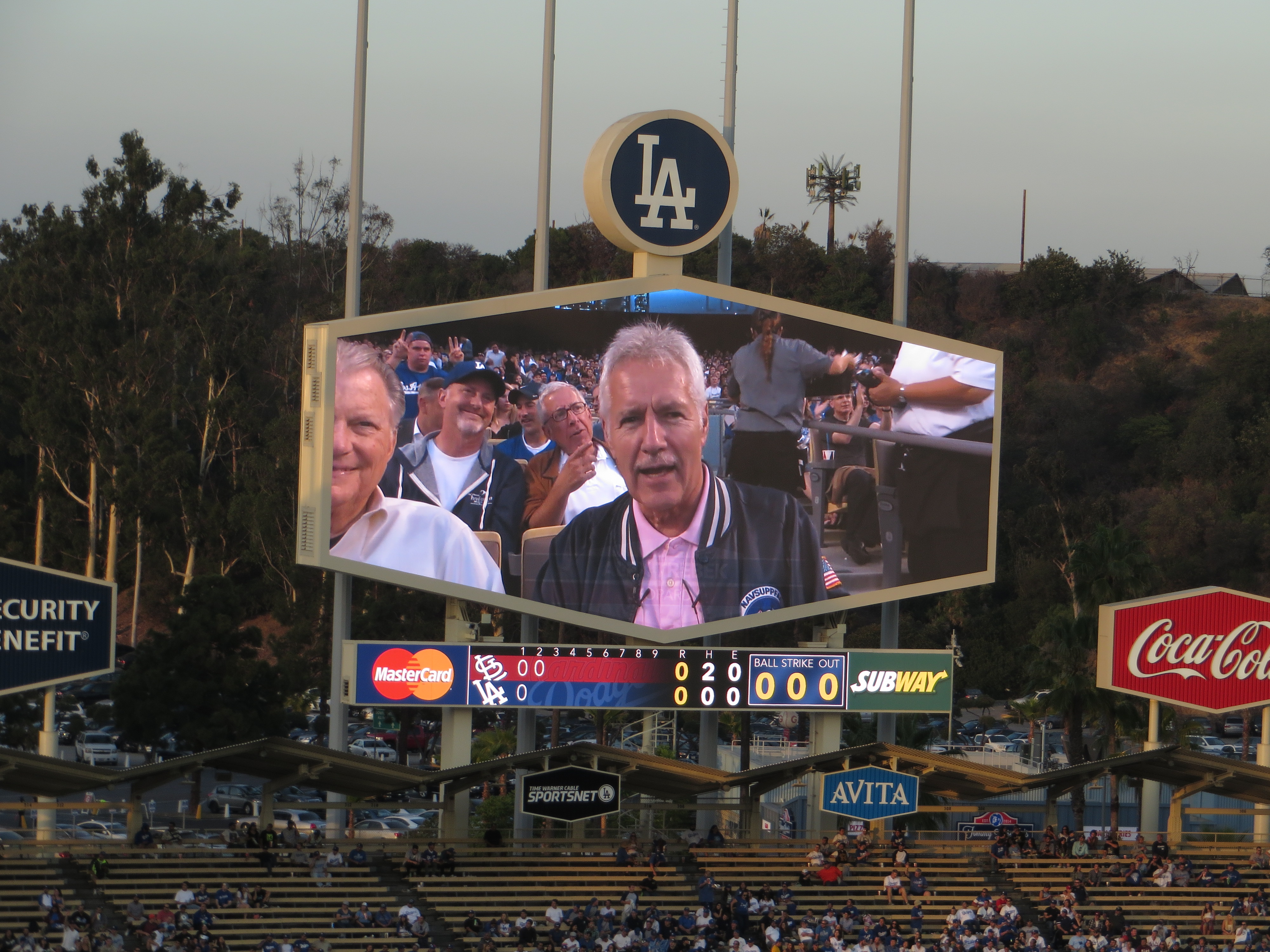
Trebek on the scoreboard of Dodger Stadium in 2014

Trebek made multiple guest appearances on other television shows, ranging from Jimmy Kimmel Live! in 2008 and 2011 to The Colbert Report series finale. In August 1995, during a return to his broadcast-news roots, Trebek filled in for Charles Gibson for a week on Good Morning America. Trebek was also a guest star in season 3 of The X-Files, playing one of two "Men in Black" (human agents charged with the supervision of extraterrestrial lifeforms on Earth, hiding their existence from other humans) opposite Jesse Ventura, in the episode "Jose Chung's From Outer Space", which first aired on April 12, 1996. On June 13, 2014, Guinness World Records presented Trebek with the world record for most episodes of a game show hosted, with 6,829 episodes at the time. He has also appeared in multiple television commercials.

External videos
- Pennsylvania Gubernatorial Debate, October 1, 2018, C-SPAN

On October 1, 2018, Trebek moderated the only debate in the Pennsylvania governor's race, between Democrat Tom Wolf and Republican Scott Wagner. According to news outlets, he wanted to change the flow of the debate to be more conversational instead of the more traditional format. Trebek dominated the debate and talked for 41% of it, often talking about himself without giving candidates time to discuss their stances on political issues. Trebek also made remarks regarding the sexual abuse scandals in the Catholic Church. He later apologized for his performance, stating that he was "naive" and "misunderstood" the role of a moderator, stating: "I offer my sincere apologies to the people of Pennsylvania, a state I dearly love."

Trebek was interviewed by Michael Strahan for an ABC special chronicling Jeopardy! and his career (produced to promote Jeopardy! The Greatest of All Time), which aired on January 2, 2020.

On October 6, 2020, Trebek made a cameo appearance in the 2020 NHL entry draft, announcing the Ottawa Senators' third-overall draft pick, Tim Stützle, in the style of a Jeopardy! question.

== Personal life ==
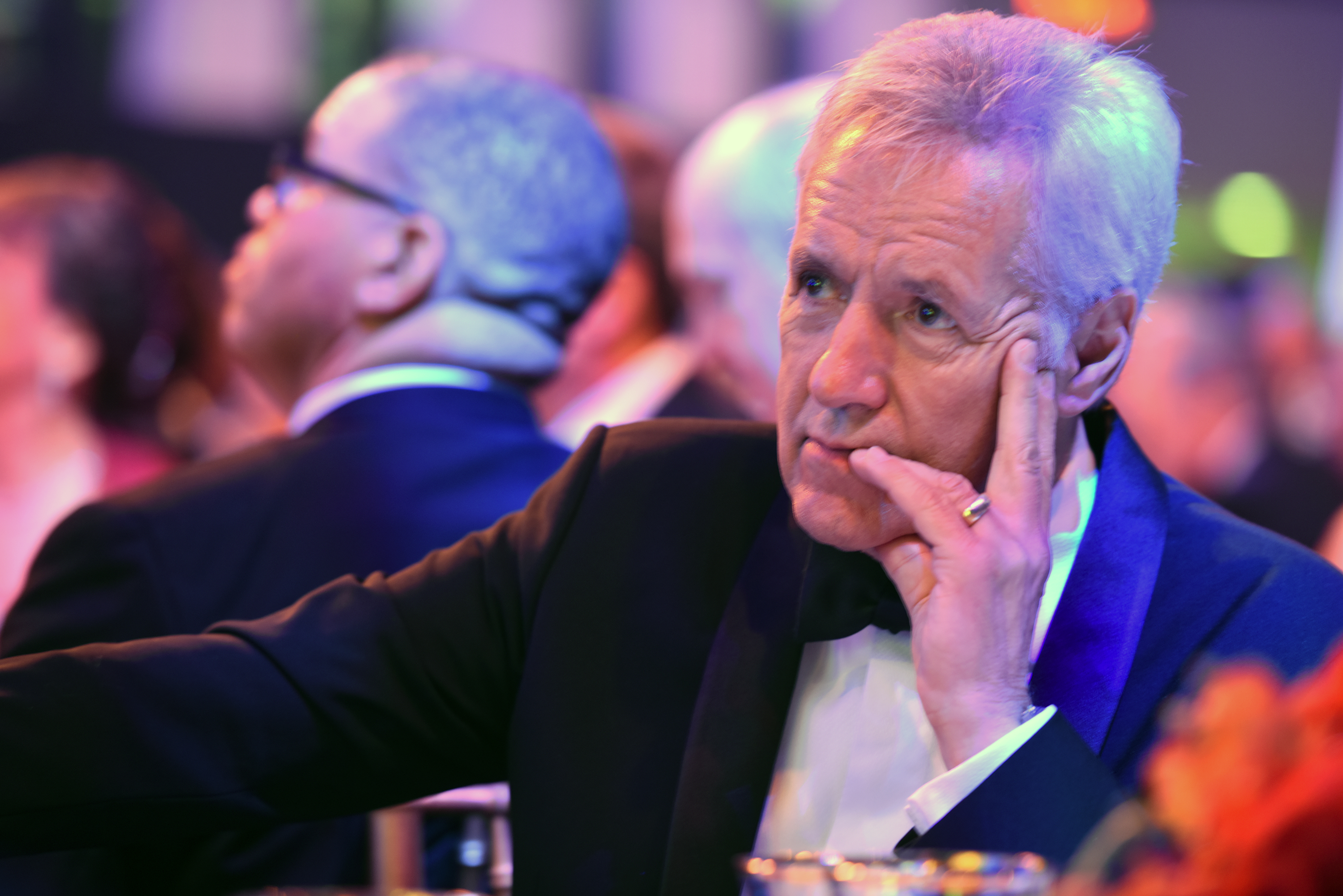
Trebek at the 2016 USO Gala

Trebek married broadcaster Elaine Callei in 1974. They had no children, although he adopted Callei's daughter Nicky. The couple divorced in 1981. In 1990, Trebek married Jean Currivan, a "professional sound healer, Reiki master and Religious Science practitioner" and a real estate project manager from New York. They had two children, Matthew and Emily.

In 1996, Trebek ran the Olympic torch in Jacksonville, Florida, through a leg of its journey to Atlanta. He became a naturalized citizen of the United States two years later.

On January 30, 2004, Trebek escaped major injury after falling asleep behind the wheel of his pickup truck while driving alone on a rural road in the Central Coast town of Templeton, California, returning from a family home in Lake Nacimiento. The truck sideswiped a string of mailboxes, flew 45 feet (14 m) over an embankment, and came to rest against a utility pole in a ditch. Trebek was not cited for the accident and returned to work taping Jeopardy! four days later.

Trebek owned and managed a 700-acre (280 ha) ranch near Paso Robles in Creston, California, known as Creston Farms, where he bred and trained thoroughbred racehorses. Trebek's colt, Reba's Gold, is the stakes-winning son of Slew o' Gold. He sold the operation in 2008, and the property is now an event center called Windfall Farms. In May 2011, Trebek was invited to visit the Western Maryland Scenic Railroad in Cumberland, Maryland, where he served as the engineer of steam locomotive No. 734, fulfilling a long-term wish of driving one.

In a 2018 interview with Vulture, Trebek said that he was a political moderate and registered independent, neither conservative nor liberal, with some libertarian leanings. Trebek stated that he believed in God as a Christian. During a 2018 gubernatorial debate, Trebek said that he was raised Catholic during his childhood and adolescence.

=== Philanthropy and activism ===
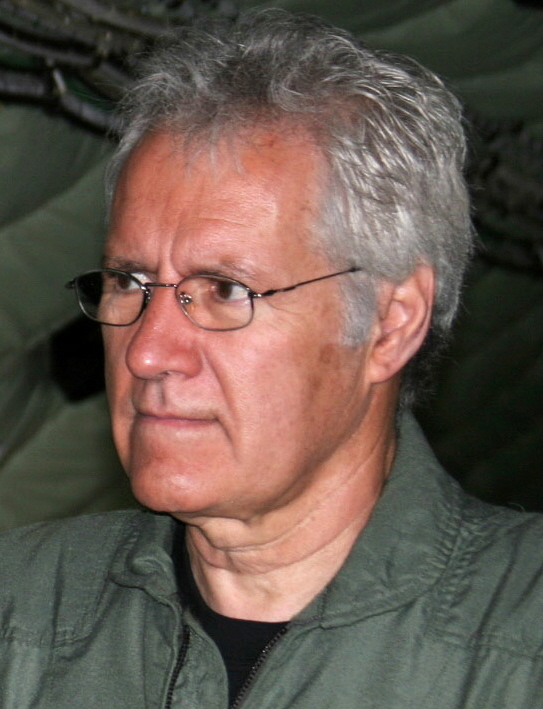
Trebek at Kadena Air Base, Okinawa, Japan, in 2007

Trebek was a longtime philanthropist and activist. He was active with multiple charities, including World Vision Canada, United Service Organizations and the United Negro College Fund. For World Vision, Trebek travelled to many developing countries with World Vision projects, taping reports on the group's efforts on behalf of children around the world. He and the Jeopardy! crew became involved with the United Service Organizations in 1995, appearing on several military bases throughout the world, both in an attempt to find contestants and as a morale booster for the troops. While genuinely supportive of the cause throughout his life, Trebek has said that he believes he initially got involved with the UNCF in the 1980s because — due to the afro, mustache, and "very dark tan" that he sported at the time — Trebek was often confused for being a Black man and so was invited to take part in the organization's telethons.

Trebek also donated 74 acres (30 ha) of open land in the Hollywood Hills to the Santa Monica Mountains Conservancy in 1998. He was later awarded one of the American Foundation for the Blind's six yearly Access Awards for his role in accommodating Jeopardy! champion Eddie Timanus. Trebek hosted the annual The Great Canadian Geography Challenge in Canada. He hosted the National Geographic Bee in the United States for 25 years, stepping down in 2013. Trebek also served on the advisory board of U.S. English, an organization that supports making English the official language of the United States.

In 2016, Trebek donated $5 million to the University of Ottawa to fund the Alex Trebek Forum for Dialogue, the objective of which is "to expose students to a wide range of diverse views, through speeches, public panels, events and lectures by University of Ottawa researchers, senior government officials and guests speakers from around the world." His gifts to the university, which at the time totaled $7.5 million, also fund a Distinguished Speaker Series, which has included a presentation by Nobel laureate Leymah Gbowee, introduced by Trebek. In 2017, he funded the Alex Trebek Leadership Award at the University of Ottawa, an annual $10,000 award to a summa cum laude graduate who has also demonstrated community leadership. By October 2020, Trebek's contributions to the University of Ottawa totaled around $10 million.

In March 2020, Trebek donated $100,000 to Hope of the Valley Rescue Mission, a homeless shelter in Los Angeles, which replaced the Skateland skating rink. It was subsequently named the Trebek Center.

Trebek owned his own wardrobe, consisting of dozens of outfits and hundreds of neckties. In February 2021, Trebek's son, Matthew, donated the wardrobe to The Doe Fund, in keeping with a statement Trebek had made on his last day of taping.

=== Health ===
On December 10, 2007, Trebek experienced a minor heart attack at his home, but returned to work as scheduled in January 2008. Early in the morning on July 26, 2011, Trebek injured his Achilles tendon while chasing a burglar who had entered his San Francisco hotel room, requiring six weeks in a cast. Trebek experienced another mild heart attack on June 23, 2012, but was able to return to work the following month.

On December 15, 2017, over the winter break of Jeopardy! taping, Trebek was admitted to Cedars-Sinai Medical Center after reportedly experiencing complications from a fall in October of that year. The incident resulted in a subdural hematoma. Trebek underwent surgery to remove blood clots from his brain the following day. On January 4, 2018, the verified Twitter account of Jeopardy! announced that Trebek had been suffering from the fall. He required a short medical leave and returned to regular hosting duty in mid-January 2018.

In 2018, while being interviewed by Harvey Levin on Fox News, Trebek floated the idea of retirement, saying the odds of his leaving Jeopardy! in 2020 were 50/50 "and a little less". Trebek added that he might continue if he is "not making too many mistakes" but would make an "intelligent decision" as to when he should give up the emcee role. In October 2018, Trebek signed a new contract to continue as host through 2022, stating in January 2019 that although he was beginning to slow down due to his age, the show's work schedule, consisting of 46 taping sessions each year, was still manageable.

==== Pancreatic cancer and death ====
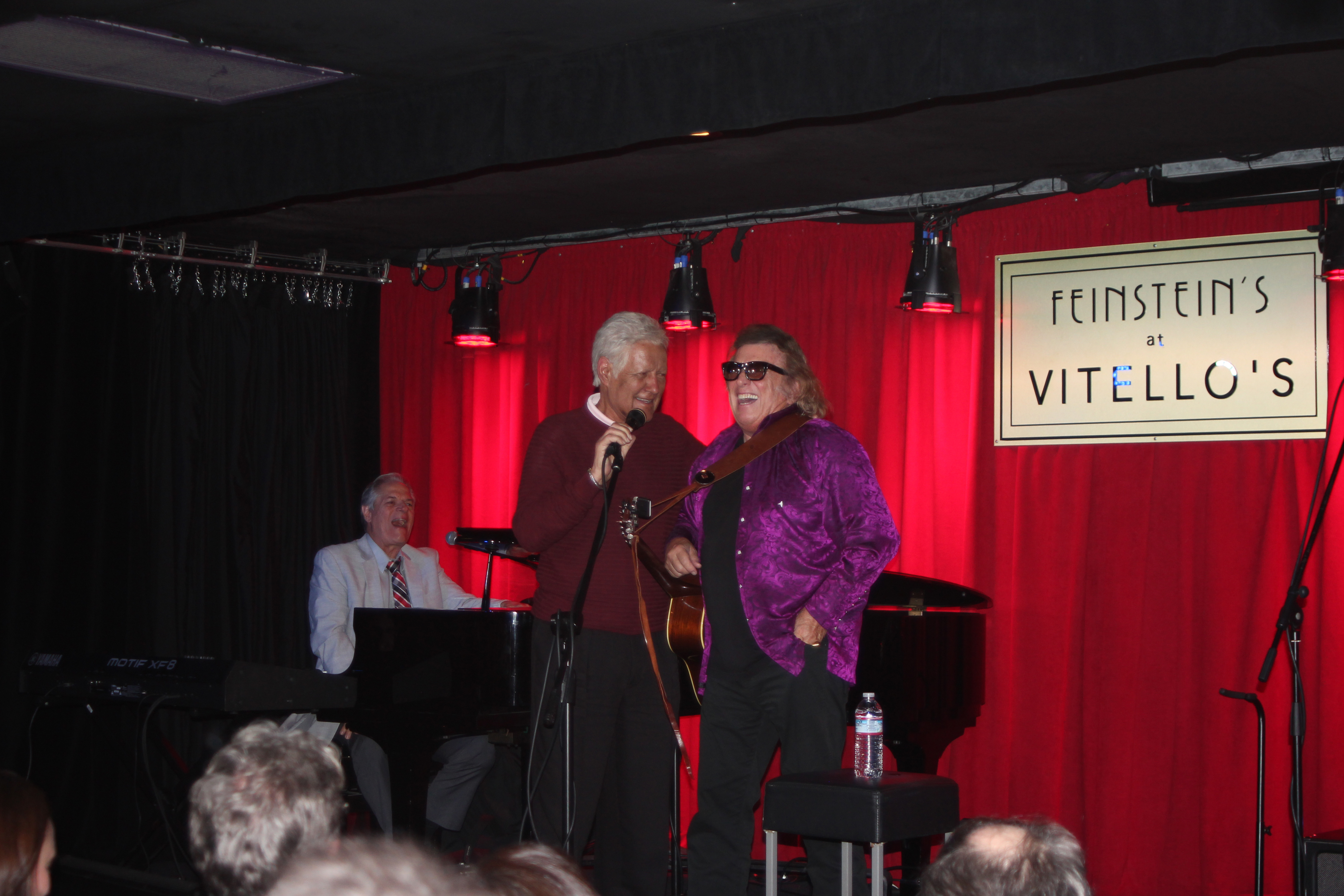
Trebek (left) with Don McLean (right) in December 2019, nine months after his diagnosis

On March 6, 2019, aged 78, Trebek announced that he had been diagnosed with stage IV pancreatic cancer. Trebek had been experiencing a persistent stomach ache before the diagnosis, but he did not recognize it as a symptom of the disease. In a prepared video announcement of the diagnosis, Trebek noted that his prognosis was poor, but stated that he would aggressively fight the cancer in hopes of beating the odds, and continue hosting Jeopardy! for as long as he was able, joking that his contract obligated him to do so for three more years. Trebek updated the situation two months later, stating that he was responding exceptionally well to treatment, and some of the tumors had shrunk to half their previously observed size; Trebek credited the prayers and well wishes of his fans for the better-than-usual results and planned to undergo several more rounds of chemotherapy. He finished that round of chemotherapy treatments in time to resume taping of the show in August 2019. Follow-up immunotherapy was ineffective, and Trebek resumed chemotherapy in September.

On October 4, 2019, in an interview with CTV chief anchor and senior editor Lisa LaFlamme, Trebek said: "I'm not afraid of dying" and "I've lived a good life, a full life, and I'm nearing the end of that life... [I]f it happens, why should I be afraid [of] that?" In the same interview, Trebek noted that sores in his mouth, a side effect from the chemotherapy, were interfering with his ability to speak, noting that "there will come a point when they (fans and producers) will no longer be able to say, 'It's okay.'" In a December 2019 interview with ABC News, Trebek stated that he would begin looking at experimental treatments and chemotherapies, and, despite periods of severe pain and depression, he was still in good enough physical condition to handle construction projects. Trebek also stated that he had already prepared an on-air farewell statement before his cancer diagnosis.

In March 2020, Trebek announced that he had survived one year of cancer treatment (noting that the one-year survival rate was 18%) and that, though the chemotherapy treatments were often worse than the cancer symptoms themselves, Trebek was confident he would survive another year, despite a 7% survival rate, saying that ending treatment would be a "betrayal" to his family, supporters, and the God in whom he had faith, along with the many prayers said on his behalf. As a precautionary measure, Jeopardy! initially taped episodes without a studio audience, as protection from the COVID-19 pandemic; Trebek, because of both his age and health condition, was particularly at risk of death from the particular variant of SARS-CoV-2 circulating. Soon afterward, production of the show was suspended altogether. The show resumed taping in August, in time for the season 37 premiere.

On July 16, 2020, Trebek gave an update regarding his cancer by saying that while he still felt fatigued, the chemotherapy was "paying off". Trebek also stated that he was looking forward to taping again. Five days later, Trebek published his memoir: The Answer Is...: Reflections on My Life.

Trebek underwent surgery related to his cancer treatment in October. Two weeks after the surgery, Trebek returned to the show, but was unable to handle his full workload due to pain from the surgery, and had to split his usual five-episode taping session over two days; these five episodes would be Trebek's last. He taped his final episode on October 29, 2020, just 10 days before his death. On November 8, Ken Jennings was called in to substitute host for Trebek for what was initially expected to be a temporary replacement, while Trebek recovered from the surgery; that same day, Trebek died at his home in Los Angeles at age 80, after 20 months fighting pancreatic cancer. It was the same illness that affected his predecessor and the original host of Jeopardy! Art Fleming, who died a little over 25 years earlier. Trebek's death became major headlines around the world, which also led some of the Big Three networks to break their regular programming for special report coverage in the United States, as well as many news reports remembering his career and life on Canada's CBC, CTV, Global Television, and other major broadcasters in his birth nation. Trebek was cremated and his ashes were given to his wife. Trebek's estate was liquidated in an estate sale in April 2022 as his daughter prepared to sell his home in Studio City.

== Legacy ==
Shortly after Trebek's death, Jeopardy! contestant and future host Ken Jennings, then-Canadian Prime Minister Justin Trudeau, and Wheel of Fortune hosts Pat Sajak and Vanna White were among those who paid tribute.

On the November 9, 2020, episode of Jeopardy!, as a tribute to Trebek, then-executive producer of both Jeopardy! and Wheel of Fortune, Mike Richards, visibly emotional, opened the show with the following statement:

I'm Mike Richards, the executive producer of Jeopardy! Over the weekend, we lost our beloved host Alex Trebek. This is an enormous loss for our staff and crew, for his family, and for his millions of fans. He loved this show and everything it stood for. In fact, he taped his final episodes less than two weeks ago. He will forever be an inspiration for his constant desire to learn, his kindness, and for his love of his family. We will air his final 35 episodes as they were shot. That's what he wanted. On behalf of everyone here at Jeopardy!, thank you for everything, Alex. This is Jeopardy!

The lights on the set then dimmed blue in remembrance. After each posthumous episode in season 37, a screen read, "Dedicated to Alex Trebek. Forever in our hearts. Always our inspiration." On the first anniversary of Trebek's death, which was also the day that the first episode Ken Jennings hosted in season 38 was aired, a different title card read, "Alex Trebek, July 22, 1940 – November 8, 2020. You are missed every day." On the second anniversary of his death, Trebek was honored in a category entitled "Remembering Alex Trebek" during the Jeopardy! round of the 2022 Tournament of Champions special exhibition episode of Jeopardy!

Since Trebek's death, various television networks aired their own tributes to him such as MeTV (which played "What Is... Cliff Clavin?" and "Mama on Jeopardy!", two episodes of the classic 1980s sitcoms Cheers and Mama's Family respectively in which Jeopardy! was a plot device), Buzzr (which aired episodes of shows Trebek guest starred in such as Card Sharks or hosted such as Classic Concentration and To Tell the Truth in the Fremantle library) and Game Show Network (which aired a Jeopardy! marathon). On the premiere episode of the rebooted American version of The Chase, where Jeopardy! champions James Holzhauer, Brad Rutter, and Ken Jennings were chasers, host Sara Haines paid tribute to Trebek at the start of the show.

Trebek's final episode of Jeopardy! aired on January 8, 2021, concluding with a 90-second tribute to Trebek.

On August 19, 2021, the Jeopardy! stage was renamed "The Alex Trebek Stage", with his family present at the dedication.

The United States Postal Service honored Trebek with a commemorative stamp honoring both the 60th anniversary of the Jeopardy! franchise and Trebek's naturalized American citizenship, with the stamp officially released on July 22, 2024, on what would have been his 84th birthday.

== Work ==
=== Filmography ===
==== Shows hosted ====
- 1963–1964: Music Hop (CBC)
- 1964: Vacation Time – co-host (CBC)
- 1966–1970: CBC Championship Curling – announcer (CBC)
- 1966–1973: Reach for the Top (CBC)
- 1969: Barris & Company – co-host/announcer (pilot) (CBC)
- 1969: Strategy (CBC)
- 1971: Pick and Choose (CBC)
- 1972: Outside/Inside (CBC)
- 1973: TGIF – announcer (CBC)
- 1973: The Wizard of Odds (NBC)
- 1974–1976, 1978–1980: High Rollers (NBC)
- 1976–1977: Double Dare (CBS)
- 1976–1980: Stars on Ice (CTV)
- 1977–1978: The $128,000 Question
- 1980–1981: Wall $treet
- 1981–1982: Pitfall
- 1981–1983: Battlestars
- 1983: Malcolm (pilot)
- 1983: Starcade (pilot)
- 1984–2021: Jeopardy! (posthumous, November 9, 2020, to January 8, 2021, episodes)
- 1985: Lucky Numbers (pilot)
- 1987: Second Guess (unsold pilot)
- 1987: VTV-Value Television – co-host with Meredith MacRae
- 1987–1991: Classic Concentration
- 1989–2013: The National Geographic Bee national finals
- 1990: Super Jeopardy!
- 1991: To Tell the Truth (1990–1991) – from February to May 1991
- 1993: The Red Badge of Courage/Heart of Courage – Canadian-produced show highlighting brave individuals
- 1996–1998: The Pillsbury Bake-Off
- 1997: Wheel of Fortune – April Fools' Day episode (also a substitute host in August 1980)
- 1999: Live from the Hollywood Bowl – annual live broadcast
- 2017: Game Changers – host and executive producer
- 2020: Jeopardy! The Greatest of All Time

==== Acting ====
- 1987: Mama's Family – as himself, the host of Jeopardy! (episode 4.19 – "Mama on Jeopardy!")
- 1988: For Keeps – as himself, the host of Jeopardy!
- 1988: Rain Man – as himself, the host of Jeopardy!
- 1990: Cheers – as himself, the host of Jeopardy! (episode 8.14 – "What Is... Cliff Clavin?")
- 1990: Predator 2 – as himself, the host of Jeopardy! (voice)
- 1990: The Earth Day Special – as himself, the host of Jeopardy!
- 1991: WrestleMania VII – as himself, a ring announcer and interviewer
- 1992: The Golden Girls – as himself, the host of Jeopardy! (episode 7.16 – "Questions and Answers")
- 1992: White Men Can't Jump – as himself, the host of Jeopardy!
- 1993: Short Cuts – as himself, the host of Jeopardy!
- 1993: Groundhog Day – as himself, the host of Jeopardy! show #1656
- 1993: The Larry Sanders Show – as himself, the minister who marries Hank Kingsley (episode 2.15 – "Hank's Wedding")
- 1993: Rugrats – as Alan Quebec, the host of "Super Stumpers" (episode 2.37 – "Game Show Didi")
- 1995: The Nanny – as himself, the host of Jeopardy! (episode 3.2 – "Franny and the Professor")
- 1995: Beverly Hills, 90210 – as himself, the host of Jeopardy!
- 1995: Blossom – as himself, the host of Jeopardy! (episode 5.14 – "Who's Not on First")
- 1995: Jury Duty – as himself, the host of Jeopardy!
- 1996: The X-Files – as a Man in Black who Agent Mulder thought looked "incredibly" like himself (episode: "Jose Chung's From Outer Space")
- 1996: Seinfeld – as himself, the host of Jeopardy! (episode 8.9 – "The Abstinence")
- 1996: The Magic School Bus – Announcer (voice) (episode 2.6 – "Shows and Tells")
- 1996: Ellen's Energy Adventure – as himself, the host of Jeopardy!
- 1997: Ned and Stacey – as himself, the host of Jeopardy!
- 1997: The Simpsons – as himself, the host of Jeopardy! in "Miracle on Evergreen Terrace" (Voice)
- 1998: Baywatch – as himself, the host of Jeopardy! (episode 9.8 – "Swept Away")
- 1998: The Weird Al Show – as himself, the host of Jeopardy! (voice)
- 1998: Mafia! – himself, riding on a parade float
- 2000: Finding Forrester – as himself, the host of Jeopardy!
- 2000: Charlie's Angels – as himself, the host of Jeopardy!
- 2000: Saturday Night Live – himself
- 2000: Arthur – as Alex Lebek, the host of Riddle Quest
- 2001: Pepper Ann – as himself (2 episodes)
- 2002: Saturday Night Live – himself
- 2006: Family Guy – as himself, the host of Jeopardy! in "I Take Thee Quagmire" (voice)
- 2007: The Bucket List – as himself, the host of Jeopardy! (voice)
- 2010: How I Met Your Mother – himself in "False Positive"
- 2012: The Simpsons – as himself, the host of Jeopardy! in "Penny-Wiseguys" (Voice)
- 2013: How I Met Your Mother – himself in "P.S. I Love You"
- 2013: Delta Air Lines – as himself, answering a Jeopardy-like question in the final segment of Delta's Holiday-themed safety video.
- 2014: Hot in Cleveland – as himself and Park Ranger Alex Trebek
- 2014: Delta Air Lines – as himself, seen raising hand after being asked if the passengers have any questions toward the end of a Delta safety video.
- 2014: The Colbert Report (series finale) – as himself, "the man who knows all the answers", in Santa's sleigh
- 2015: The Amazing Race Canada 3 – as himself/Sudbury Pit Stop greeter
- 2018: Orange Is the New Black – as himself
- 2018: RuPaul's Drag Race – as himself
- 2020: Last Week Tonight with John Oliver – as himself
- 2020: 2020 NHL Entry Draft – as himself
- 2020: Scooby-Doo and Guess Who? - as himself, the host of Jeopardy! in "Total Jeopardy" (voice, posthumous release)
- 2021: Free Guy – as himself, the host of Jeopardy! (final film role, posthumous)

=== Bibliography ===
- Alex Trebek (July 21, 2020). The Answer Is...: Reflections on My Life. Simon & Schuster. ISBN 9781982158002.

== Accolades ==
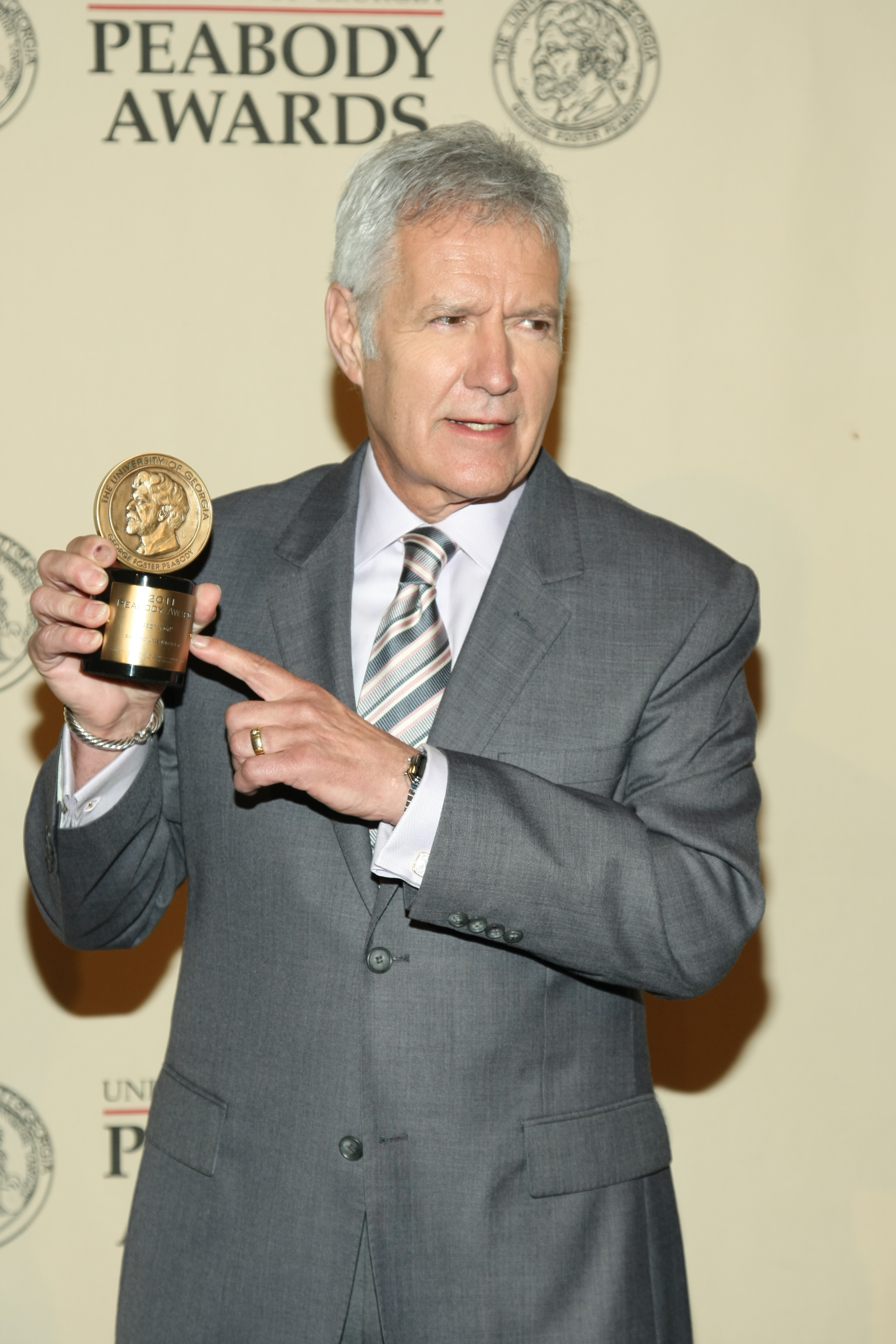
Trebek with the Peabody Award in 2012

In 1997, Trebek was awarded the honorary degree of Doctor of the university (D.Univ) from the University of Ottawa. In addition to awards for Jeopardy!, he received a great deal of recognition. Trebek received a star on Canada's Walk of Fame in Toronto. He was also awarded eight Outstanding Game Show Host Emmy Awards (1989, 1990, 2003, 2006, 2008, 2019, 2020, and 2021) and a star on the Hollywood Walk of Fame (at 6501 Hollywood Boulevard, near those for Ann-Margret and Vincent Price).

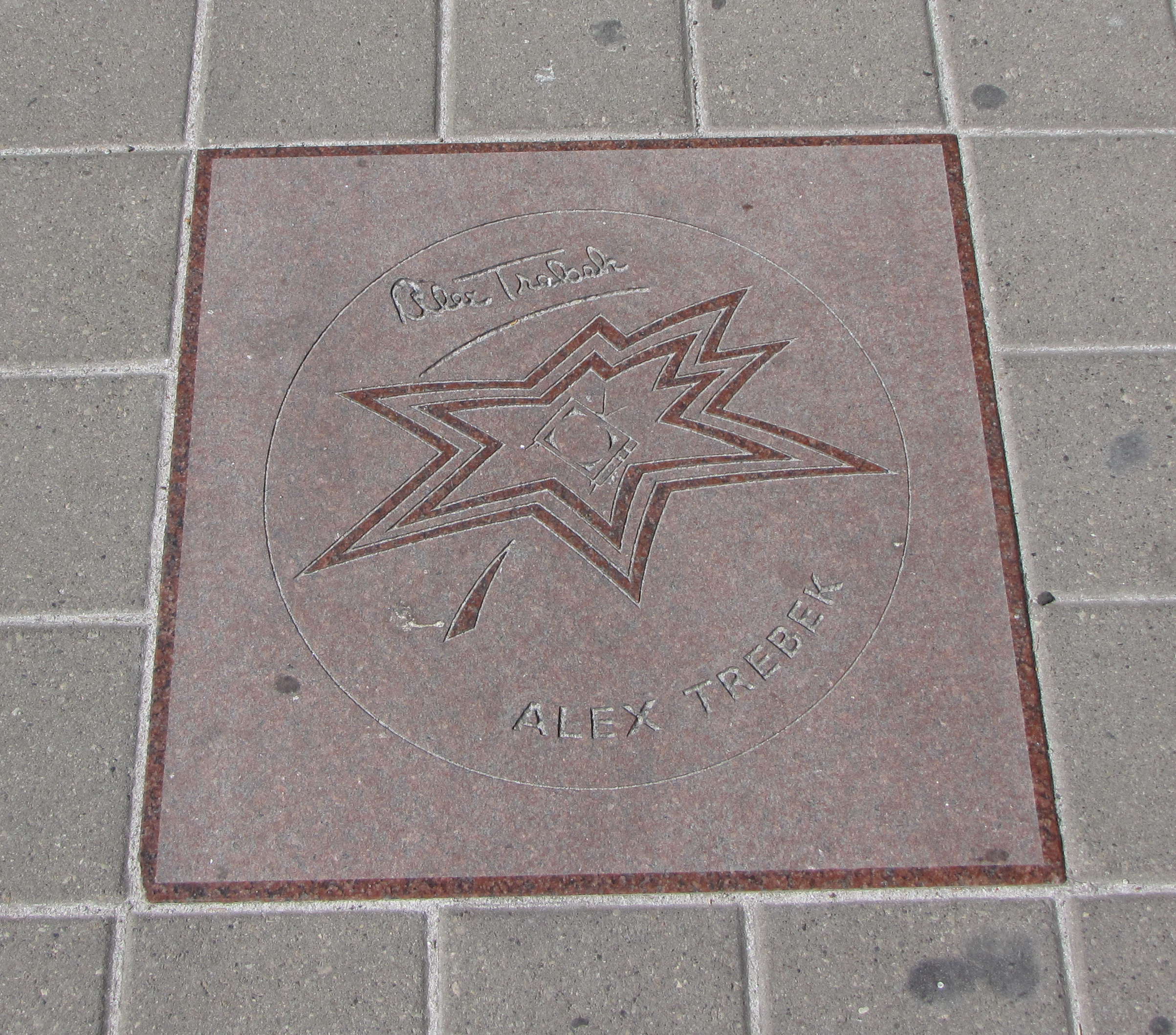
Trebek's star on Canada's Walk of Fame

On November 4, 2010, Trebek received the Royal Canadian Geographical Society's gold medal for his contribution to geographic education and the popular study of geography. Previous recipients of this award include the author and anthropologist Wade Davis (2009), Peter Gzowski (1997), and Mary May Simon (1998). In 2016, Trebek was named the Honorary President of the Royal Canadian Geographical Society; in that capacity, he was present at the opening of the RCGS's new headquarters in 2018.

In 2011, it was announced that Trebek would be one of the recipients of the Lifetime Achievement Award at the Daytime Emmy Awards. That same year, he received an Honorary Doctorate from Fordham University. Since June 13, 2014, Trebek has held a Guinness World Record for "the most game show episodes hosted by the same presenter (same program)" for having hosted 6,829 episodes of Jeopardy!, overtaking previous record holder Bob Barker. On May 4, 2015, Trebek's alma mater, the University of Ottawa, named its alumni hall in his honor, as a benefactor to the university.

In May 2016, Trebek was given the Key to the City by the City of Ottawa. On June 30, 2017, he was named an Officer of the Order of Canada by then-Governor General David Johnston for "his iconic achievements in television and for his promotion of learning, notably as a champion for geographical literacy." On June 28, 2019, Trebek was awarded the 2019 Americanism Award by the Daughters of the American Revolution.

On January 7, 2020, Trebek and his wife Jean were awarded the Fordham Founder's Award at Fordham University.

In December 2019, Trebek was named the winner of the Academy of Canadian Cinema and Television's Icon Award for the 8th Canadian Screen Awards in 2020. Although the ceremony was cancelled due to the COVID-19 pandemic in Canada, the award was presented to Trebek in a recorded acceptance speech, which the academy released to social media platforms in January 2021 to coincide with the broadcast of Trebek's last episode of Jeopardy!

In July 2021, the Royal Canadian Geographical Society and the National Geographical Society announced a grant program called The Trebek Initiative, whose goal is to promote emerging Canadian explorers, scientists, educators and photographers. A month later, artist Kevin Ledo created a mural memorializing Trebek on the outer wall of Sudbury Secondary School, where Trebek had attended high school, as part of the Up Here Festival.

On August 19, 2021, prior to the start of Jeopardy! season 38 taping, Sony Pictures Studios sound stage Studio 10 was officially renamed as "The Alex Trebek Stage".

On September 29, 2022, Trebek was posthumously inducted into the inaugural class of the Jeopardy! Hall of Fame at the first Jeopardy! Honors event. His widow, Jean, accepted the award on his behalf.

In November 2023, Trebek's widow Jean, alongside television personality Katie Couric (who served as a guest host on Jeopardy! in March 2021 following Trebek's death) launched "The Alex Trebek Fund" in his honor in partnership with Stand Up to Cancer, to support scientists working on improving screening and treatment options for pancreatic cancer.

On June 21, 2024, the U.S. Postal Service announced that it will issue a first-class Forever stamp honoring Trebek, which was released on July 22, 2024, on what would have been his 84th birthday. The stamp's design is in the form of a Jeopardy!-style question.
