= Classy Christmas =

- The Office episodes
- Episode nos.: Season 7 Episodes 11/12
- Directed by: Rainn Wilson
- Written by: Mindy Kaling
- Cinematography by: Matt Sohn
- Editing by: David Rogers; Claire Scanlon
- Production code: 711/712
- Original air date: December 9, 2010
- Running time: 44 minutes

Guest appearances
- Part 2: Rob Huebel as A.J.; Jack Coleman as Robert Lipton

Episode chronology
← Previous "China"	Next → "Ultimatum"
- The Office (American season 7)

"Classy Christmas" is the collective name for the eleventh and twelfth episodes of the seventh season of the American comedy television series The Office, and the show's 137th and 138th episodes overall. Written by Mindy Kaling and directed by Rainn Wilson, the episode originally aired on December 9, 2010, in the United States on NBC. "Classy Christmas" guest stars Jack Coleman as Senator Robert Lipton, Rob Huebel as A.J., Mark Proksch as Nate, and marks the return of Amy Ryan as Holly Flax.

The series—presented as if it were a real documentary—depicts the everyday lives of office employees in the Scranton, Pennsylvania, branch of the fictional Dunder Mifflin Paper Company. In the episode, Michael Scott (Steve Carell) is overjoyed about the return of his old love, Holly Flax. Michael forces Pam Halpert (Jenna Fischer) to plan a second Christmas party for Holly's return to Scranton. Meanwhile, Darryl Philbin (Craig Robinson) convinces his daughter to attend the party. Jim Halpert (John Krasinski) agrees to a snowball fight with Dwight Schrute (Rainn Wilson), which he later regrets. Oscar Martinez (Oscar Nunez) notices something scandalous about Angela Martin's (Angela Kinsey) new boyfriend.

The scenes that were filmed outdoors in Los Angeles had to be crafted to look as if it were cold; in reality, temperatures reached 90 °F (32 °C) and above. The snowmen used in the episode took a day to create and used over 100 tons of chipped ice. "Classy Christmas" was viewed by 7.18 million viewers and received a 3.7 rating among adults between the age of 18 and 49, marking a slight drop in the ratings when compared to the previous week. Despite this, the episode was the highest-rated NBC series on the night that it aired. It received largely positive reviews from critics.

== Synopsis ==
Michael Scott learns that Toby Flenderson will be taking a leave of absence to go on jury duty for the Scranton Strangler trial, leading the corporate office to send Holly Flax to cover for him. Michael forces Pam Halpert to plan a second, classier Christmas party for Holly's return to Scranton. Michael welcomes Holly back, but becomes upset when she tells him that she and A.J. are still in a relationship. Holly then tells the women of the office that she's giving A.J. an ultimatum: either propose to her by year's end or their relationship is over. Michael lies to Holly and tells her that he is seeing a woman named Tara from New York, and Holly shows curiosity, but Michael interprets this as potential jealousy. When Michael gets further upset over hearing about Holly's relationship with A.J., he takes her toy Woody from Toy Story—a present from A.J.—throws it in the trash, and pours his coffee on it. When Holly demands to know who did it, Michael comes forward and admits that he still has feelings for her. A.J. arrives in Scranton to surprise Holly and Michael welcomes him politely. After cleaning Holly's Woody, he leaves the office and Pam follows him out, where he breaks down. In order to lift his spirits, Pam tells him about Holly's ultimatum, suggesting their relationship is not going to last very long. He returns to the party where he overhears Holly and A.J. talking about Woody, with Holly fabricating a story to cover for Michael's actions.

Darryl Philbin is upset that his daughter Jada would rather spend Christmas with her mother than him. At the party, Jada begins to lose interest, but Pam and Andy Bernard try to find fun activities for her; however, Andy ends up ruining most of them. Darryl then takes her to the break room, where she is impressed with the snacks in the vending machines. They take out the snacks and hand them to employees. When she hands one to Michael, he decides to dress up as Santa again so she can tell him what she wants for Christmas as Holly looks on with admiration. Angela Martin brings her new boyfriend Robert Lipton to the party. Oscar Martinez believes that Robert is secretly gay.

Pam says that her husband Jim Halpert always makes her great Christmas gifts, so she wants to make him one too. She creates a hand-drawn comic book about Jim, who gets attacked by a radioactive bear and takes its powers. She asks for others' opinions before giving it to Jim, but most of them give her harsh critiques. Jim gives Pam a beautiful bracelet and he is amazed at the comic book she gives him. Jim and Dwight Schrute agree to a snowball fight after Jim throws a snowball at Dwight indoors. When he is first challenged outside, however, he finds the doors chained. Dwight then emerges from a snowman, throwing multiple snowballs and leaving Jim with a bloody nose. Throughout the day, Dwight torments Jim with increasingly elaborate snowball ambushes. Jim tries to surrender, but Dwight refuses. At the end of the day, Jim is too afraid to go outside. He and Pam find multiple snowmen, and Jim attacks them all hoping to find Dwight. Dwight, however, is on the roof of the building, claiming that the greatest snowball in a snowball fight is fear, and smilingly wishes the camera "Merry Christmas".

== Production ==
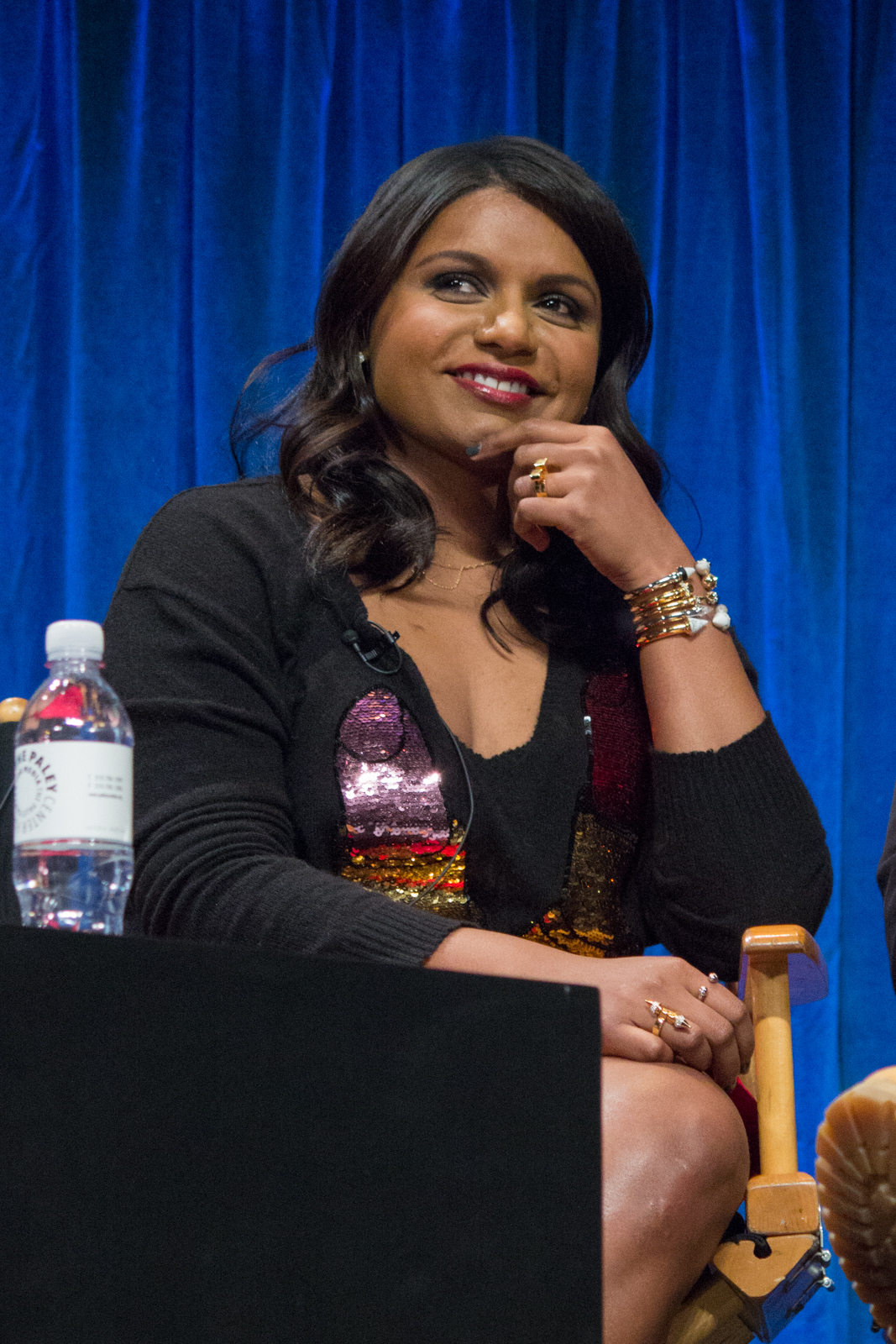
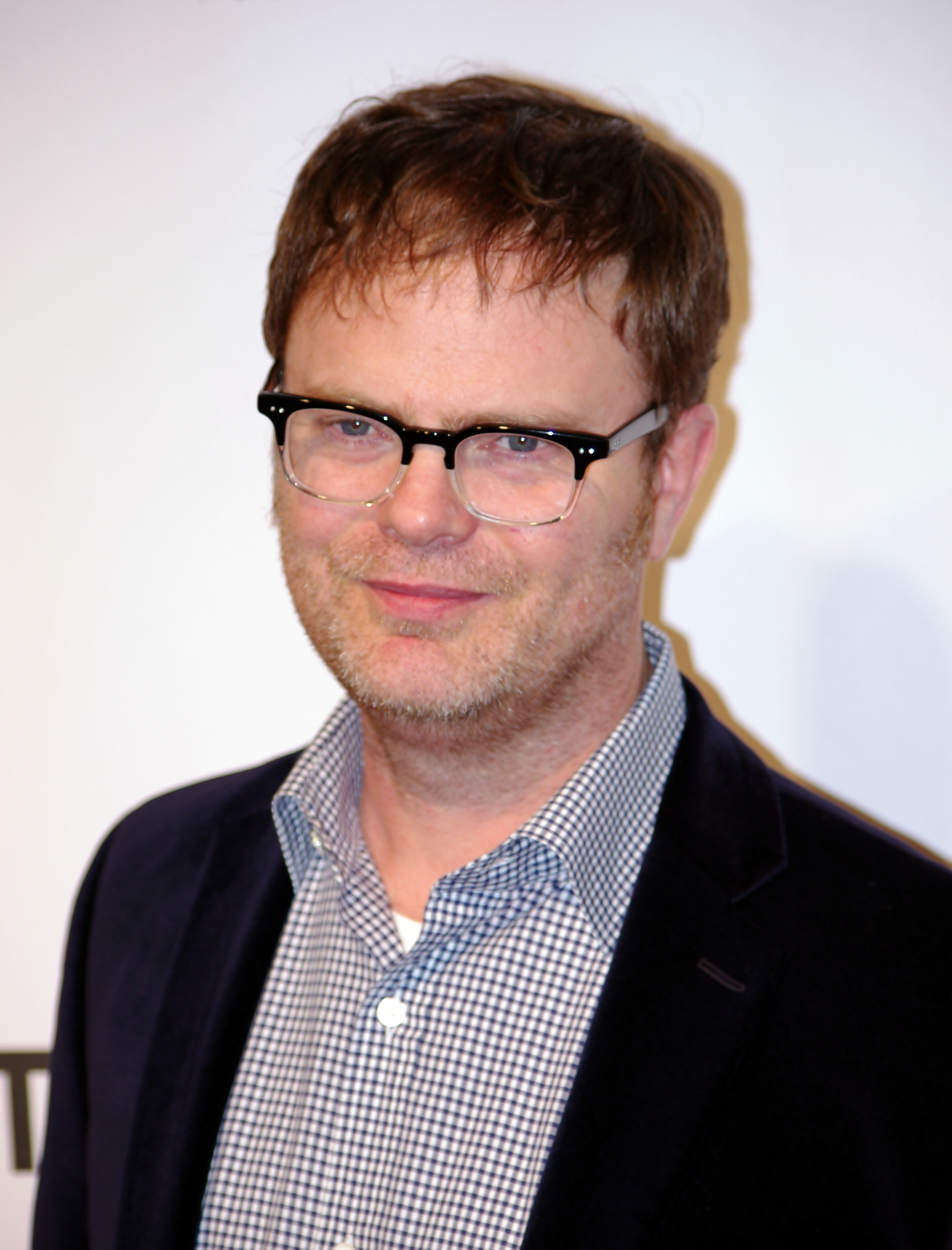
The episode was written by Mindy Kaling (left) and directed by Rainn Wilson (right).

The episode was written by co-executive producer Mindy Kaling, her eighteenth writing credit for the series. Rainn Wilson, who portrays Dwight Schrute on the series, directed the episode, his second directing credit of the series after the sixth-season episode "The Cover-Up". The episode was also the first of several season seven episodes that saw the return of Amy Ryan as Holly. Kaling purposely made Dwight "complicated" and "mean" in the script; she wanted to avoid Jim and Dwight becoming friends, calling it something that would happen in a "crappy sitcom feel-good formula." Kaling specifically wrote Jim to be "off-guard [and] surprised" in the episode, because she reasoned that "perfect isn't always nearly as fun to play or watch as flawed." The episode was filmed in early November and was shot out of order. This required the assistant directors of The Office to re-dress "the sets from white, spare 'classy Christmas' look to the elaborate, colorful 'regular Christmas look.'"

According to Kaling, the group had to pretend like it was cold during the outdoor scenes when it was actually warm. The snow that was used for the snowballs was artificial, and did not cooperate well. According to Kaling, the snowballs would "'explode' before they made contact". While Krasinski and Wilson did not hold back during the fights, neither one was injured; the blood on Jim's face and shirt was artificial. The snowmen featured at the end of the episode took a day to construct. In addition, the artificial snow had to be maintained, and footprints had to "be tracked constantly" to maintain continuity. The snowmen were crafted out of 100 tons of chipped ice, and the show's special effects team created molds and hand-crafted the creations. The scenes featuring the snowmen were shot on the hottest day of the episode's shoot in Los Angeles, with temperatures reaching above 90 degrees Fahrenheit. The entire crew was outfitted UV-protectant glasses because "snow-blindness was a real possibility." To prevent heat-related injuries, an on-set medic monitored the staff and crew; anyone who was slated to appear outside was "slathered in sunscreen" and kept inside until "moments" before each shot.

The Season Seven DVD contains two deleted scenes from this episode (Jim asking Erin for a first aid kit, and Pam talking about Holly's ultimatum), as well as longer versions of Kelly giving out the Sabre gifts and Toby discussing the Scranton Strangler trial.

== Cultural references ==
Michael claims that, to a person from New Hampshire, a fake tree is the same as a burning cross. Darryl mentions that he has a fondness for the Nickelodeon series iCarly, specifically complimenting the voice of Freddie Benson, played by Nathan Kress. A line that was cut from the scene features Darryl harshly criticizing the Disney Channel series The Suite Life of Zack & Cody. The gifts that Kelly decides to give to her staff members on Corporate's behalf are laptop sleeves, featuring the popular fictional character Hello Kitty, which is produced by the Japanese company Sanrio. Holly's gift from A.J. is a replica of Woody from Toy Story, the 1995 animated Disney & Pixar film about friendly toys coming to life when no one is around. When Michael claims he heard Holly would be single, he blames "Nora Ephron and every romantic comedy ever". Andy disguises himself as the Grinch and steals the Christmas tree's star for the sake of Jada's entertainment.

== Reception ==
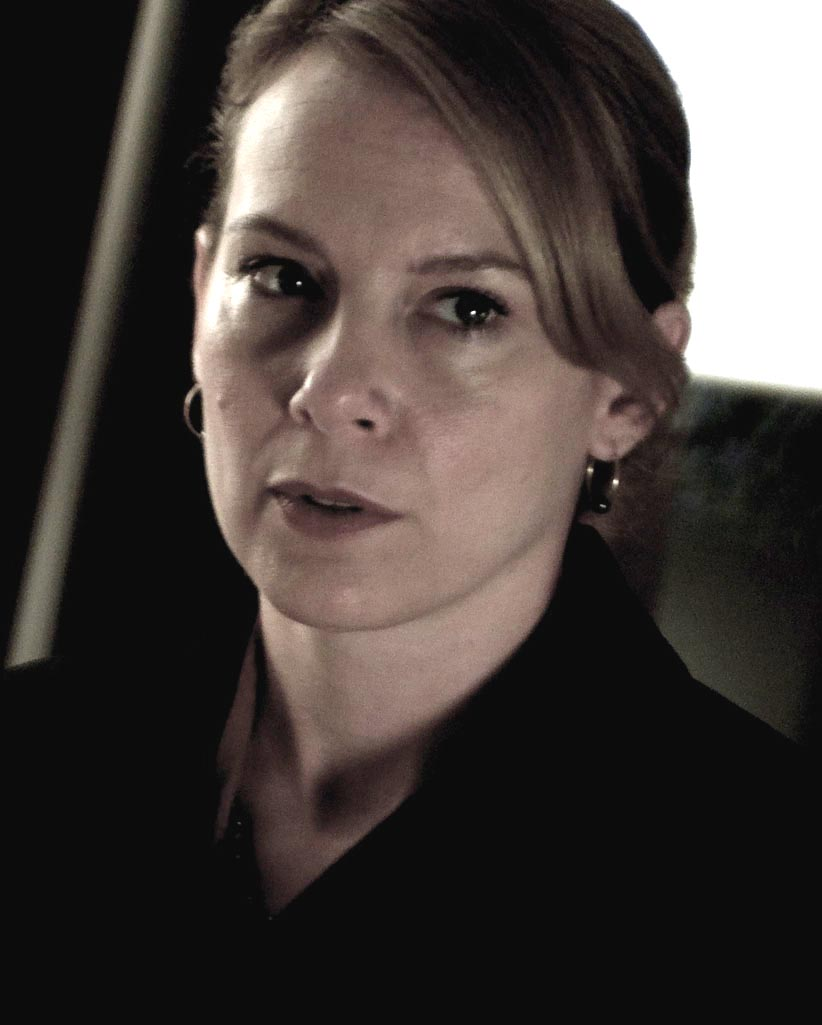
Many critics applauded the reintroduction of Holly Flax, played by Amy Ryan.

"Classy Christmas" first aired on December 9, 2010. The episode received 3.7/10 percent share among adults between the ages of 18 and 49 according to Nielsen ratings. This means that 3.7 percent of all households with an 18- to 49-year-old living in it watched the episode, and ten percent had their televisions tuned to the channel at any point. The episode was watched by 7.18 million viewers, dropping in viewers from the previous week, although ratings were adjusted down due to a local NFL game broadcast in Indianapolis and Nashville. Despite this, the episode was the highest-rated NBC series of the night that it aired.

This episode received mostly positive reviews. James Poniewozik of Time magazine said, "'Classy Christmas' may not have been one of the show's most hilarious episodes ever, but it did recall the best era of the show, when it was able to deliver with storylines that were as much drama as comedy." He also said that "it was an initially good payment". TV Fanatic's Dan Forcella said that "Classy Christmas" was an enjoyable episode and "watching Jim suffer as Dwight jumped out of a snowman and pummeled him with snow ball after snow ball was absolutely hilarious." Despite this, he also said it was not as good as the second season episode "Christmas Party". IGN writer Matt Fowler named it the third best Christmas episode of the series calling it a "good episode, with a sweet ending".

Alan Sepinwall of HitFix called the episode "another standout holiday episode", and applauded the return of Holly, calling her "welcome". He enjoyed the episode largely because it was full of "darkness"; he noted that "I like when The Office aims for something non-comic, so long as it takes its characters seriously, which it did here." Sepinwall also complimented the subplot featuring Jim being terrorized by Dwight, applauding both Kaling's writing and Wilson's directing. Bonnie Stiernberg of Paste magazine argued that the reappearance of Holly—a signal that Steve Carell's exit was approaching—"gifted [the viewers] with some of the show's best writing in a long time."

Myles McNutt of The A.V. Club gave it a slightly more critical review, awarding it a "B". He compared the episode the third season episode "A Benihana Christmas", writing that "both deal with Michael’s heart being broken and the somewhat self-destructive ways he deals with it." However, he felt that the episode "struggles greatly if you have no emotional connection to Holly and Michael" because it "isn't funny, by any real stretch of the term, nor is it really intended to be funny." He went on to say "I like episodes like this one in general and don't necessarily need the show to make me laugh, but I would say that I wanted this hour to be slightly more... pleasant."
