= Pick and Choose =

- Genre: Short film
- Presented by: Alex Trebek
- Country of origin: Canada
- Original language: English
- No. of seasons: 1

Production
- Producer: Nancy Riley
- Running time: 30 minutes

Original release
- Network: CBC Television
- Release: 4 July – 12 September 1971

Pick and Choose is a Canadian short film television series that aired on CBC Television in 1971.

== Premise ==
Alex Trebek hosted this selection of short films produced at CBC stations throughout Canada. Episodes would be given a theme such as artists, history or women, around which the films were grouped.

== Scheduling ==
This half-hour series was broadcast Sundays at 2:00 p.m. (Eastern) from 4 July to 12 September 1971.
