= List of The Magic School Bus episodes =

This is a list of episodes of the children's television series The Magic School Bus, which is based on the series of books of the same name written by Joanna Cole and Bruce Degen. The series aired on PBS for four seasons, from September 10, 1994 to December 6, 1997.

The show's continuity is not necessarily dependent on the order in which the episodes aired. In the first episode aired ("Gets Lost In Space"), Arnold mentions that the class has already been inside a rotten log ("Meets the Rot Squad") and to the bottom of the ocean (various episodes, including "Gets Eaten", "Blows Its Top", and "Ups and Downs").

== Series overview ==
Season	Episodes	Originally released	
Season	Episodes	First released	Last released
1	13	September 10, 1994	December 3, 1994
2	13	September 9, 1995	December 2, 1995
3	13	September 14, 1996	December 25, 1996
4	13	September 13, 1997	December 6, 1997

== Episodes ==
=== Season 1 (1994) ===
No. overall	No. in season	Title	Topic	Directed by	Written by	Guest star	Original release date	Prod. code
1	1	"Gets Lost In Space"	The Solar System	Lawrence Jacobs	Brian Meehl & Jocelyn Stevenson	N/A	September 10, 1994	MSB-01
Arnold Perlstein's cousin, Janet Perlstein, visits Ms. Valerie Frizzle's (aka the Friz's) class to go on their first field trip to the planetarium to watch a show about the solar system. When the planetarium is closed, Arnold desperately suggests they go into outer space. The class explores Mercury, Venus, and Mars, while Janet collects proof of their voyage. In the asteroid belt, while Janet is trying to collect an asteroid as further proof, they lose the Friz and find themselves lost in space. They reunite on Pluto, but Janet is desperate to bring her space stuff back, so Arnold gets her to forget about proving herself by taking off his helmet. Arnold gets a cold but Janet learns that she doesn't need to prove anything as long as Ms. Frizzle's class believes her.
2	2	"For Lunch"	Digestion	Lawrence Jacobs	Ellen Schecter, Brian Meehl, John May & Jocelyn Stevenson	N/A	September 17, 1994	MSB-02
With Arnold chewing gum, trying to break the school record for the longest chewing time, he swallows the gum, much to Wanda Li's dismay. To Arnold’s surprise, he finally gets his wish by staying at school with their class pet, Liz, while the Friz takes the rest of the class on another weird field trip...without realizing it is his own digestive system. Arnold wins the award for being the "best field trip ever."
3	3	"Inside Ralphie"	Germs	Lawrence Jacobs	John May & Jocelyn Stevenson	Tyne Daly	September 10, 1994 (Fox Kids); September 24, 1994 (PBS)	MSB-03
The class needs Ralphie Tennelli to give them a story idea for Broadcast Day, but he is sick. His mother (Tyne Daly), who is a doctor, refuses to allow him to go to school. When the Friz says that there is an amazing battle going on inside him, the class decides Broadcast Day should be about whatever is making him sick. After shrinking and going into his veins through a cut on his leg, they travel to his sore throat to see what is making him sick, as it reveals to be bacteria. Then, after they forget to stay out of the crossfire, his white blood cells see the bus as a threat and attempt to devour it.
4	4	"Gets Eaten"	The Food Chain	Lawrence Jacobs	Jocelyn Stevenson & John May	N/A	October 1, 1994	MSB-04
Arnold and Keesha Franklin are supposed to do a "bring-in" of two beach things that go together for a report, but they both completely forget about it. She brings in a tuna fish sandwich, and he brings the "scum" he gets on his shoe when he steps in a pond. They have nothing in common...or do they?
5	5	"Hops Home"	Habitats	Lawrence Jacobs	Jocelyn Stevenson	N/A	October 8, 1994	MSB-05
Some of the class is bringing animals to school and Wanda has brought her pet frog, Bella. When she escapes, Wanda is determined to get her back. The Friz takes the class to several different places, until they find a perfect frog habitat.
6	6	"Meets The Rot Squad"	Decomposition	Lawrence Jacobs	John May & Jocelyn Stevenson	Ed Begley Jr.	October 15, 1994	MSB-06
The Friz's class learns about what makes things rot by getting small enough to examine a rotting log up close when Wanda attempts to have it removed to plant a new tree in its place. Also, Arnold wants everyone to be part of the "Leave-The-Log-As-It-Is" club.
7	7	"All Dried Up"	Desert Adaptation	Lawrence Jacobs	Brian Meehl & Jocelyn Stevenson	N/A	October 22, 1994	MSB-07
Phoebe Terese is worried about all the poor animals living in deserts. How will they ever survive? Fortunately, the Friz takes her class on an overnight field trip to the desert in order to do something about it, and for once, Arnold is not complaining.
8	8	"In The Haunted House"	Sound	Lawrence Jacobs	John May, Kristin Laskas Martin & Jocelyn Stevenson	Carol Channing	October 29, 1994	MSB-08
Carlos Ramon invents a new instrument for a class concert at the Sound Museum, but it sounds awful. When the bus breaks down, they miss the rehearsal, giving Carlos more time to perfect his instrument. But to do so, the class must learn how sound is made in the middle of the night in the Sound Museum itself, where they learn about its history.
9	9	"Gets Ready, Set, Dough"	Kitchen Chemistry	Lawrence Jacobs	Brian Meehl, John May & Jocelyn Stevenson	Dom DeLuise	November 5, 1994	MSB-09
On the Friz’s birthday, the class wants to throw a surprise party for her, but they do not have a cake. The magic school bus is acting up on their field trip to a bakery, and it shrinks. How will they make the Friz a cake when they are only around a millimeter tall?
10	10	"Plays Ball"	Forces	Lawrence Jacobs	Brian Meehl & John May & Jocelyn Stevenson	N/A	November 12, 1994	MSB-10
Dorothy Ann Hudson has brought a book about physics, but everyone else finds it boring. Ralphie borrows it from her to use it as a replacement for home plate, of which she does not learn until they set off on a field trip. The Friz decides to back up and get the book, but the bus shrinks and lands on page 97 which has a "frictionless" baseball field. The class soon learns that friction is needed for the simplest actions, from playing baseball to walking. However, when it comes time to leave, the book closes due to high winds--and the entire class gets stuck! How will they find a way to escape?
11	11	"Goes To Seed"	Seeds	Lawrence Jacobs	Ronnie Krauss, Brian Meehl & Jocelyn Stevenson	Robby Benson	November 19, 1994	MSB-11
The class is planting a garden, but Phoebe's plant is at her old school. They decide to go there, but she is worried about the Friz embarrassing her and her old teacher, Mr. Archibald Seedplot (Robby Benson).
12	12	"Gets Ants In Its Pants"	Ants	Lawrence Jacobs	Jocelyn Stevenson, Kristin Laskas Martin & Brian Meehl	N/A	November 26, 1994	MSB-12
The class is going to make a movie about ants, and Keesha is the director. She finds an ant to be the star, but it runs away to an ant hill with hundreds of others, leaving her increasingly frustrated at her inability to find one to serve as the focus of the movie.
13	13	"Kicks Up A Storm"	Weather	Lawrence Jacobs	John May, Brian Meehl & Jocelyn Stevenson	N/A	December 3, 1994	MSB-13
Ralphie decides to call himself Weatherman, but a jealous Keesha claims that he is not. Enraged, she tells Ralphie that the heat is getting to him, which makes him angry as well. So he decides to prove his worth by creating a thunderstorm, but makes a mistake and things go out of control.

=== Season 2 (1995) ===
- Danny Tamberelli replaces Amos Crawley as Arnold.
- Andre Ottley-Lorant replaces Max Beckford as Tim.

No. overall	No. in season	Title	Topic	Directed by	Written by	Guest star	Original release date	Prod. code
14	1	"Blows Its Top"	Volcanoes	Charles E. Bastien	Sean Kelly, George Arthur Bloom, & Jocelyn Stevenson	N/A	September 9, 1995	MSB-14
According to the Friz, there is an island so new it has yet to be discovered. Carlos wants to name it "Carlos Island", but Dorothy Ann has decided to get a name by looking in a book. However when they arrive, there is no island. Luckily, the Friz says it has not arrived yet. In the end, it is revealed that it was created by an underwater volcano.
15	2	"Flexes Its Muscles"	Body Mechanics	Charles E. Bastien	John May, Jocelyn Stevenson, & George Arthur Bloom	Tony Randall	September 16, 1995	MSB-15
The magic school bus is acting up again, so Ms. Frizzle decides to take it to a nearby Body Shop owned by R.U. Humerus (Tony Randall), for repairs. Meanwhile, Ralphie has been dreaming what it would be like if he had a robot to do all his chores. So he and the rest of the class (but Keesha) want to try building one using all the gadgets in the Body Shop. First, though, they will have to understand how bones and muscles work.
16	3	"The Busasaurus"	Dinosaurs	Charles E. Bastien	Ronnie Krauss, Brian Meehl, & George Arthur Bloom	Rita Moreno	September 23, 1995	MSB-16
The class visits the Friz’s old friend, Dr. Carmina Skeledon (Rita Moreno), at a dinosaur dig. She lets Arnold see a fossilized dinosaur egg as they are leaving, and he still has it when they go back in time. An Ornithomimus steals it, and he and Phoebe chase after it. The rest of the class is left to find them, and in the end, Arnold faces off with a Tyrannosaurus rex after being grown.
17	4	"Going Batty"	Bats	Charles E. Bastien	Ronnie Krauss, Brian Meehl, & George Arthur Bloom	Tyne Daly, Dana Elcar, Elliott Gould, Eartha Kitt, & Edward James Olmos	September 30, 1995	MSB-17
Ralphie is convinced that the Friz is a vampire when she shows up outfitted in a cape, speaking with a Transylvanian accent, and moving and talking like one. She is now taking all the kids' parents on a little field trip and Ralphie is convinced she is going to do something terrible to them. Special Guests cast: Tyne Daly as Dr. Tennelli, Dana Elcar as Mr. Terese, Elliott Gould as Mr. Perlstein, Eartha Kitt as Mrs. Franklin, Edward James Olmos as Mr. Ramon
18	5	"Butterfly And The Bog Beast"	Butterflies	Charles E. Bastien	Brian Meehl & George Arthur Bloom	N/A	October 7, 1995	MSB-18
The Friz’s class needs a new mascot for their soccer team because the other one is so old that nobody even knows what it is anymore. Phoebe is convinced it should be the butterfly, but the rest of the class disagrees with this. Janet returns and convinces them that it should be the "Bog Beast". Since nobody seems to know what that is, the Friz takes them on a trip to the swamp to find out.
19	6	"Wet All Over"	The Water Cycle	Charles E. Bastien	Jocelyn Stevenson, George Arthur Bloom, & Kristin Laskas Martin	N/A	October 14, 1995	MSB-19
The Friz’s class is excited about going to Waterland. Wanda and Arnold are working on a project together and somehow she convinces him to go to the girls' bathroom with her to get water. Getting distracted, he accidentally leaves the Friz’s keys along with Liz in there, and worse, he forgets to turn the water off. When they leave for Waterland, Ms. Frizzle instead uses a spare key which turns her, the class, and the bus into water. (Note: Part of this episode appeared on the video Kids for Character to illustrate responsibility.)
20	7	"In a Pickle"	Microorganism	Charles E. Bastien	Jocelyn Stevenson, Brian Meehl, & George Arthur Bloom	N/A	October 21, 1995	MSB-20
The Friz’s class has just come back from vacation and found that the vegetables that had won a contest have rotted. Keesha is particularly distressed, not because her first prize cucumber has rotted, but because it is gone and has been replaced with a pickle. She reasons that the door to the classroom was locked over vacation and the Friz had the key. To everyone's surprise, the Friz admits that she did do something to the cucumber. The kids put her on trial and make Liz the judge. She claims that the cucumber was turned to a pickle by a group of microbes, which she nicknames "The Mike Robe Gang," and she takes the class on a field trip to prove it.
21	8	"Revving Up"	Engines	Charles E. Bastien	Sean Kelly, Brian Meehl, & George Arthur Bloom	Sherman Hemsley	October 28, 1995	MSB-21
Mr. Junkett (Sherman Hemsley), a vehicle maintenance inspector, is so displeased when he inspects the bus that he decides to take it to the junkyard to be crushed. Now the Friz’s class has to do something to save it. Naturally, they decide to shrink and go inside its engine. All the problems seem to be caused by peanut butter, as Mr. Junkett was eating a peanut butter sandwich while he was inspecting it. (Note: There is an animation error in this episode, whereas one of the students (most notably Ralphie, Keesha, and Dorothy Ann) have their suits changed to a different color. For example, Ralphie's suit went from lime-green to chartreuse, Keesha's suit went from dark pink/fuchsia to maroon/dark red, and Dorothy Ann's suit went from violet to a light magenta color. Another animation error in this episode is that when Carlos says, "Line's clear, Ms. Frizzle!", his suit is the same color as Ralphie's, and Dorothy Ann's gloves are pink. In later scenes of this episode, one scene has Ralphie, Tim, and Dorothy Ann missing when the cylinder lowers.)
22	9	"Taking Flight"	Flight	Charles E. Bastien	Kermit Frazier & George Arthur Bloom	N/A	November 4, 1995	MSB-22
Wanda and Tim Wright have built a model airplane for a model show. The Friz decides to shrink the class so they can fly in it. Tim, Phoebe, and Liz stay on the ground to operate the remote control, but then Tim doesn’t watch where he is stepping and then the remote control smashes. The class learns all about flight, only to crash land into a tree. Meanwhile, Tim, Phoebe, and Liz try to turn the bus into different airplanes (two of which can't fly) to go rescue them.
23	10	"Getting Energized"	Energy	Charles E. Bastien	Brian Meehl & George Arthur Bloom	N/A	November 11, 1995	MSB-23
At the Walkerville carnival, the Friz’s class is running a Ferris Wheel, however, it doesn't work for some reason. Carlos' little brother, Mikey, comes to the rescue. Since electric power will not work, they decide to use the energy of falling rocks. If the passengers ride in one side of the wheel and the rocks land on the other, then they will cause it to turn without hurting anyone. The problem is how to get them to it.
24	11	"Out Of This World"	Space Rocks	Charles E. Bastien	Libby Hinson & George Arthur Bloom	Swoosie Kurtz	November 18, 1995	MSB-24
Dorothy Ann has a nightmare about an asteroid crashing into Walkerville Elementary. She also spots one that will hit Earth in about five days and is worried that it will destroy the school to make her nightmare come true. To protect it with her ideas, the Friz’s class calls NASA, and has decided "to find it, follow it, and finish it off". They also encounter a meteor and comet.
25	12	"Cold Feet"	Warm/Cold-Blooded	Charles E. Bastien	Jocelyn Stevenson, John May, & George Arthur Bloom	Michael York	November 25, 1995	MSB-25
Liz has disappeared and the trail leads to Herp Haven, which is some kind of spa for reptiles. There, they see a woman named Mrs. Westlake ask for her turtle to be "toasted and stuffed, just like the last one". They decide to lead a rescue mission to find Liz, on which they learn about reptiles and how they need to move from place to place to get comfortable because they are cold-blooded, which comes in handy, as the Friz has turned them into some.
26	13	"Ups And Downs"	Buoyancy	Charles E. Bastien	Brian Meehl & George Arthur Bloom	Cindy Williams	December 2, 1995	MSB-26
Talk show reporter Gerri Poveri (Cindy Williams) is reporting that there is a monster in Walker Lake. The Friz’s class (especially Wanda) is very eager to find it. Phoebe also wants to do so so she can feed it. However, the bus' automatic sinking lever is rusted. They will have to find some other way to get it to sink. They succeed by adding weight and "crumpling" it. However, at the bottom, they discover that the monster is a fake; Gerri made the story up to increase her ratings. Now they will have to make the bus float again, so they can tell the truth to the public.

=== Season 3 (1996) ===
No. overall	No. in season	Title	Topic	Directed by	Written by	Guest star	Original release date	Prod. code
27	1	"In A Beehive"	Honeybees	Charles E. Bastien	Doug Booth	N/A	September 14, 1996	MSB-27
When Wanda and Tim are delivering honey from Tim's grandfather's bee farm, they encounter a bee flying around them, causing their cart to tip over, all of the jars to fall and break, and the honey to flow down the storm drain. Desperate to replace the ruined honey, the Friz’s class learns about the life cycle of honeybees to make more. When they accidentally lead a bear to the hive, they end up having to help the honeybees replace their lost supply of food as well as replacing Wanda's and Tim's merchandise. In the end, a customer tells them that the honey they made is the best-tasting yet.
28	2	"In The Arctic"	Heat	Charles E. Bastien	Brian Meehl	N/A	September 21, 1996	MSB-28
Arnold wants to know what happened to the heat from his cocoa. The Friz thinks it is fitting to learn about heat in the land of ice and cold, so she takes the class to the Arctic. However, she accidentally drives the bus into the water, and the engine freezes. To make matters worse, the bus has been trapped on an ice flow with Phoebe, Ralphie, and Liz. The rest of the class will have to get to it and heat it up to escape.
29	3	"Spins A Web"	Spiders	Charles E. Bastien	Robert Schechter	Ed Asner	September 28, 1996	MSB-29
The Friz’s class goes to a drive-in theater to see the black and white B-film Stand by Your Mantis from 1953 featuring General Araneus (Ed Asner) who is attempting to destroy a giant praying mantis. Carlos and Phoebe are not enjoying it: he hates insects and spiders, and she is upset and declares that if she were in the movie, she would trap the praying mantis, take it somewhere else, and free it. Naturally, this gives the Friz an idea. So she drives the bus into the movie. General Araneus takes over it, kidnaps Liz, and pushes a button that makes the class go back out of the movie and shrink. He wants to use Liz as bait for the praying mantis. Outside the movie, the class encounters a lot of spiders, and when Liz pushes a button that pulls them back into the movie, they apply what they have learned about spiders to stop General Araneus from using her as praying mantis bait.
30	4	"Under Construction"	Structures	Charles E. Bastien	Libby Hinson	Rosalind Chao	October 5, 1996	MSB-30
The Friz’s class is going on a field trip to the new suspension bridge currently being constructed. However, there is a problem: Wanda's mother, Mrs. Li (Rosalind Chao) needs her to watch her little brother, William, until she gets off her business call. The class decides to watch William together, but he accidentally uses the Porta-Shrinker to shrink them (without Liz) and the magic school bus and locks them in the bathroom, while he uses the bus as a toy. They use the materials available to them to build structures to escape, only to discover an alligator in the bath. Note: “Under Construction” is the first episode in which the magic school bus does not transform in any way.
31	5	"Gets A Bright Idea"	Light	Charles E. Bastien	Ronnie Krauss	N/A	October 12, 1996	MSB-31
Janet is let down by the all-school field trip to a light show, considering that she wants to see a magic show. Janet tells the Friz’s class she could do a magic trick, but can't because of the ghost that haunts the theater. When the class leaves it they find Arnold missing. When they enter it again, they see his "ghost". Keesha is convinced that it is really a trick being done by Janet to scare them. She soon finds out that Janet is using the Pepper's Ghost Effect to do so.
32	6	"Shows And Tells"	Archaeology	Charles E. Bastien	John May	Alex Trebek	October 19, 1996	MSB-32
The Friz’s class is on an international Show and Tell game show, in which one person shows and the other tells. Arnold will bring his rock collection and Dorothy Ann will be doing the "tell" part. However, Arnold forgets the collection. He had found a strange object, which he thinks would work much better, but nobody even knows what it is. The Friz then takes the class on a field trip to find out. She turns the magic school bus into Suppose-O-Tron that can test their hypothesis.
33	7	"Makes A Rainbow"	Color	Charles E. Bastien	George Arthur Bloom & Jocelyn Stevenson	Paul Winfield	October 26, 1996	MSB-33
The Friz has invented a magical pinball machine that uses light instead of balls. (The light travels much slower than in the real world.) It goes through a prism and the player attempts to bounce the different colored beams of light into the appropriate eye in order to "make a rainbow". The Friz says if she fails to win the game, it will be taken away. The class decides to help, and they shrink the bus and go inside it. The principal, Mr. Ruhle, shows up, and Arnold tries to stall him. Meanwhile, the rest of the class can’t find a way out of the machine because they are trapped inside.
34	8	"Goes Upstream"	Migration	Charles E. Bastien	Ronnie Krauss	N/A	November 2, 1996	MSB-34
Ralphie is wondering what happened to all the salmon. They need them for the school fish fry, but none of them are there. The Friz has decided to take the class on a marine field trip to find out. She turns the magic school bus into a salmon and puts a compact disc in it that makes it think like a real salmon, so it will go wherever Ralphie's salmon went. However, when it starts migrating, Ralphie changes his mind about doing anything to find out what happened to the salmon. He, Keesha, Carlos, and Wanda attempt to stop it, but to no avail.
35	9	"Works Out"	Circulation	Charles E. Bastien	Jocelyn Stevenson, George Arthur Bloom, & Robert Schechter	Dan Marino	November 9, 1996	MSB-35
At this year's Teacherathalon, the Friz is competing against Mr. Sinew (Dan Marino), a gym teacher with giant muscles. Janet returns once again and supports him. The class is convinced that there is no way the Friz can beat someone who can destroy shirts simply by flexing his muscles. Ralphie wants to know what lungs have to do with how your muscles work, so they go on a field trip inside the Friz herself.
36	10	"Gets Planted"	Photosynthesis	Charles E. Bastien	Ronnie Krauss	N/A	November 16, 1996	MSB-36
The Friz’s class is performing a play of Jack and the Beanstalk. As Phoebe gets stage fright, she decides to make the props. However, there is a problem with the beanstalk: she tried to grow a real one, but it only sprouted; so she tried to build one, but it fell and broke. Naturally, Ms. Frizzle turns her into one and she becomes shorter than Liz. However, no one is sure how plants get food.
37	11	"In The Rainforest"	Rainforest Ecology	Charles E. Bastien	Brian Meehl	Matt Frewer	November 23, 1996	MSB-37
The class has decided to give the Friz a present for Earth Day--a cocoa bean tree in the Amazon Rainforest, as cocoa beans are used to make chocolate. The day just happens to be the one when the first shipment reaches them, but for some reason, the tree has produced none. They go to the rainforest to find the reason and the Friz hires Tim and Dorothy Ann "RFIs," or Rainforest Investigators. The tree is in a patch of the rainforest controlled by Inspector 47 (Matt Frewer), who talks with a strong French accent and runs around the rainforest in a white suit. He is very proud that he got rid of the mud in his patch, however, the class finds out, at the end, that the mud's absence was what caused that of cocoa beans. The mud holes were where the insects that pollinated the cocoa pods lived, and it is revealed that Inspector 47 had covered the rainforest floor with artificial turf. They explain this to him and he decides to "rip up this filthy artificial turf with my bare hands".
38	12	"Rocks And Rolls"	Erosion	Charles E. Bastien	Jocelyn Stevenson, George Arthur Bloom, & Robert Schechter	Jessica Walter	November 30, 1996	MSB-38
The Friz’s class is sculpting a statue of their city's founder, Captain Krasnick P. Walker Esquire. He left instructions on how he wanted it sculpted in the form of a poem. They interpret the meaning--he wants it sculpted without the use of hands--a little too literally. However, the statue breaks off the top of the mountain due to ice erosion, and falls down. The Friz has to take the class on an emergency field trip and turns the magic school bus into a rock. Water erosion reduces the statue to its head by the time they reach the bottom of the river. Desperate to get to the ceremony, the bus cracks open a dam of rocks that has formed and slides down the mountain, only to crash land into the ceremony. However, they found that somehow they made the mountain into a statue of Captain Walker's head and realize that he had wanted it sculpted through erosion!
39	13	"Family Holiday Special"	Recycling	Charles E. Bastien	Brian Meehl & John May	Dolly Parton	December 25, 1996	MSB-39
It is the day before the winter holidays, and the class is taking stuff to the recycling center, which is run by Friz’s cousin, Murph (Dolly Parton). Wanda is going to see The Nutcracker by Pyotr Ilyich Tchaikovsky and is bringing a toy soldier instead of taking money, as they are taking toys to give to homeless children. As usual, something goes wrong. Arnold mistakes the soldier for something being taken to the recycling center and it is turned into plastic pellets. An enraged Wanda declares she wishes recycling had never been invented. Naturally, this gives the Friz an idea. She turns the magic school bus into an anti-recycling machine, which changes the city to the way it would be without recycling. It cuts down the forest, and turns recycling trucks into garbage trucks. The class is confused when it turns the swing set in the park into aluminum cans and such. Wanda is still pleased, since if recycling had never been invented, then her soldier would be still waiting for them in the classroom. However the bus turns the school into a garbage dump when they get there. Finally, the bus "unrecycles" itself. Wanda then apologizes to Arnold for having ever wanted to get rid of recycling, and wants it back. The Friz changes the bus so it changes everything back. Wanda makes new toy soldiers from the melted plastic pellets. Arnold has to leave for his sick grandmother for Hanukkah, but to his surprise, his classmates, the Friz, and Murph appear. Note: “Holiday Special” aired as a special one-hour episode during its original airing. The first 30 minutes is the regular episode and the second half of the hour is a behind the scenes look of the series with the voice cast. For subsequent reruns, it aired as a regular 30 minute episode with the behind the scenes segment cut out. The home video release is also missing the behind the scenes segment and only features the 30 minute version seen in syndication.

=== Season 4 (1997) ===
No. overall	No. in season	Title	Topic	Directed by	Written by	Guest star	Original release date	Prod. code
40	1	"Meets Molly Cule"	Molecules	Lawrence Jacobs	Ronnie Krauss	Wynonna Judd	September 13, 1997	MSB-40
Wanda's favorite singer, Molly Cule (Wynonna Judd), is coming to Walkerville. Wanda wants to have the great honor of washing her car, so the rest of the Friz’s class sets up a car wash. She miraculously chooses theirs over automatic car washes. The reason for this is explained when she says that she can't afford to have her hood ornament get wet. When Arnold asks what it's made of, she says, "That's my little secret, Sugar." She continues to call him "Sugar" for the remainder of the episode. After they clean the car, she finds a tiny blot of tar on the hood using a "megamagnifier." They shrink down to the size of molecules to find it, and clean it off. However, when they get back, Wanda accidentally knocks Molly's hood ornament into their bucket of water. It occurs to Arnold that it is made from sugar, from what she said when he asked her what it was made from. The class shrinks down to the size of molecules again to rebuild it. After they start, the sugar molecules begin to crystallize and it gets put back together before Molly returns. They then get to participate in her concert.
41	2	"Cracks A Yolk"	Eggs	Lawrence Jacobs	Ronnie Krauss	Paul Winfield	September 20, 1997	MSB-41
Mr. Ruhle gives the Friz’s class the task of caring of his pet chicken, Giblets (since Carlos takes care of his pet goat, Folly). However, he frantically escapes and the class decides to get a new Rhode Island Red to replace him. Naturally, they decide to hatch one from an egg. They learn that in order to produce a chicken, they would need a fertilized egg. At the last minute Giblets returns, and the Friz cracks, "I guess he who flies the coop can always fly back again."
42	3	"Goes To Mussel Beach"	Tidal Zones	Lawrence Jacobs	John May, George Arthur Bloom, & Jocelyn Stevenson	N/A	September 27, 1997	MSB-42
The Friz's class goes to a beach, but Ralphie insists on keeping them in one spot, which the rest of the class think is the most rotten one there, being crowded with other people. Ralphie, however, insists that this is where they want to be. Meanwhile, the Friz hears that her Uncle Shelby needs a special spot saved for someone named “Mert.” Eager to get away from Ralphie's, the rest of the class agrees. However, they find this one's inhabitant is not a human; it is a mussel. They decide the middle tidal zone is too crowded so they decide to find a spot. However, they find worse problems in the low one and the high one, so they eventually come back. When they get back to Ralphie, they try to apply what they have learned to convince him to change spots, but they discover that he did have his reasons for picking his-–an ice cream truck stops by!
43	4	"Goes On Air"	Air Pressure	Lawrence Jacobs	Brian Meehl, George Arthur Bloom, & Jocelyn Stevenson	N/A	October 4, 1997	MSB-43
For the Walkerville space capsule, the Friz’s class has to put in something on air. Keesha brings an "empty" pickle jar though, as she explains, "It's not empty; it's filled with air." The rest of the class believes this is extremely pathetic and Ms. Frizzle "accidentally" gets them stuck inside it. Conveniently, they have to use air to get out of it in time for the space capsule's liftoff.
44	5	"Gets Swamped"	Wetlands	Lawrence Jacobs	George Arthur Bloom & Robert Schechter	N/A	October 11, 1997	MSB-44
The Walkerville town hall is debating whether to build a mall where the swamp is now, or to build it somewhere else. With the toss of a coin, the Friz’s class finds themselves defending the swamp and Janet arguing against them. However, they find out that it is home to several organisms, an argument Janet finds little more than a joke, with which the city agrees. That is, until lightning strikes and knocks over a tree, blocking off the swamp and flooding the city. After the crisis is resolved, the city realizes that if it were to build a mall on the swamp, then it would be washed away. When the clock strikes midnight, the class only has one hour left to make a good argument, so they must do so on time before it's too late.
45	6	"Goes Cellular"	Cells	Lawrence Jacobs	Jocelyn Stevenson	N/A	October 18, 1997	MSB-45
Arnold is about to have the honor of being the first kid to receive one of the Rocky Awards at the annual Granite Awards, held at the Walkerville Hotel. However, he has an embarrassing predicament. For reasons that are never exactly explained, he has eaten only Seaweedies for a month and has consequently turned orange (carotenosis) ("It's my favorite color; except when it's my own skin.") He then asks, "What's the difference between my skin and let's say, Phoebe's?" So, of course, the class goes on a field trip to compare their skin, but they get nowhere since none of Phoebe's cells are orange. They have to learn about cells and how they get energy to solve the mystery before Arnold is forced to accept the award. It turns out the Seaweedies are high in carotene and his exclusive eating them has pigmented his skin.
46	7	"Sees Stars"	Stars	Lawrence Jacobs	Noel MacNeal	Dabney Coleman	October 25, 1997	MSB-46
On Dorothy Ann's birthday, she, unfortunately, is sick and has to stay home. The Friz’s class does not know what to get her as a present until they see a man named Horace Scope (Dabney Coleman) on S.S.N. (a.k.a. the Star Shopping Network), who is selling the stars for seven dollars each. Tim reasons that if every student puts in a dollar, they will be able to buy Dorothy Ann a star and name it after her. However, Keesha refuses to put in hers, as her grandmother was once duped by a similar organization, the Home Mopping Network. Therefore the Friz takes the class on a field trip back to outer space to see the three stars being sold by Horace for themselves. They encounter a T Tauri star, a yellow dwarf with two exoplanets, and a red supergiant star. Note: Dorothy Ann is the only student to have a birthday in this episode.
47	8	"Gains Weight"	Gravity	Lawrence Jacobs	George Arthur Bloom	Paul Winfield	November 1, 1997	MSB-47
Phoebe has been chosen to do a slam dunk for the school. But how can she when she is not being tall enough? She reasons that maybe if she just knew how it felt, then maybe she could do it. Therefore, The Friz takes the class into outer space once again and transforms the magic school bus into a planet with adjustable gravity. With little gravity, Phoebe finds a slam dunk easy, but with no gravity it is impossible to even make the ball go through the basket. However, when the lever accidentally falls into the position of heavy gravity, the class has trouble even standing up! They will have to restore the gravity to normal so they can return to Earth in time for Phoebe's performance.
48	9	"Makes A Stink"	Smelling	Lawrence Jacobs	George Arthur Bloom	Bebe Neuwirth	November 8, 1997	MSB-48
After Carlos finds his mothball from his room, Flora Whiff (Bebe Neuwirth), the famous expert on smell--whose "nose knows"--comes to school to judge the “First Annual Smell Search.” The Friz’s class creates a unique smell which is bound to win first prize, but Janet, determined to win by herself, evilly corrupts it to a stench that even a skunk would hate. They discover the secret to what makes things smell...now they have to make sure their creation will not make a big stink.
49	10	"Gets Charged"	Electricity	Charles E. Bastien	Suzanne Bolch, George Arthur Bloom, & Jocelyn Stevenson	N/A	November 15, 1997	MSB-49
On Valentine's Day, the Friz’s class is selling light bulbs as a fundraiser. They decide to go to the Friz’s house to see if she wants to buy some, but her doorbell unfortunately is not working. Tim and Wanda find her, and overhear her reading a "love letter". The class now has to fix the doorbell before her "big connection" comes over.
50	11	"Gets Programmed"	Computers	Charles E. Bastien	John May & Ronnie Krauss	Malcolm McDowell, Paul Winfield	November 22, 1997	MSB-50
Mr. Ruhle gets a new computer, and the Friz’s class has the job of setting it up and opening the school. Carlos's little brother, Mikey, is a computer expert. After he sets the computer up to raise the flag, make the coffee in the teachers' lounge, open the doors, turn on the sprinklers, and ring the bell, he goes on his own trip to see its inner workings. Carlos records his voice with a handheld microphone. As usual, something goes wrong, along with the replay of his recorded voice, as Mikey has set the computer to do the tasks every minute instead of everyday. Can the class get to him to have him fix the problem?
51	12	"In The City"	City Critters	Charles E. Bastien	Noel MacNeal, George Arthur Bloom, & Jocelyn Stevenson	N/A	November 29, 1997	MSB-51
On the class' first "normal" field trip to the zoo, they wonder how the animals could live in the city. The Friz then turns them into various city animals (Tim, Arnold, and Phoebe into foxes; Ralphie, Wanda, and Keesha into opossums; Dorothy Ann and Carlos into peregrine falcons, and herself into a raccoon), but the magic school bus mistakes itself for a bear, and with Liz inside, leaves them. Worse, the city authorities are after it, Carlos thought that it is a lost sheep needing to return home. Will the class get to it in time, or will they be animals forever?
52	13	"Takes A Dive"	Coral Reefs	Charles E. Bastien	Jocelyn Stevenson	N/A	December 6, 1997	MSB-52
For their coral reef projects, the Friz's class each worked with partners. Wanda hates partnership, and instead of working with hers, Dorothy Ann, she does her own project. The Friz tells the class about her great-grandfather, Redbeard the Pirate, leaving treasure in a coral reef, and Wanda, a wannabe pirate, wants to look for it. The Friz tells them to go two-by-two with their partners, which Wanda teams up with Dorothy Ann, Keesha teams up with Ralphie, Tim teams up with Carlos, and Arnold teams up with Phoebe. They learn about mutualistic, symbiotic relationships in coral reefs. They are forced to work together when they see that one part of the reef has been bleached out by none other than the treasure chest. They then go back to school, and open it up, which has a portrait of Redbeard and a model of his ship that can change shape much like the magic school bus.

== Home media ==
=== Videocassettes ===
These videocassettes were released by KidVision and later Warner Home Video.

- Gets Lost in Space (February 1, 1995)
- For Lunch (February 1, 1995)
- Inside Ralphie (June 13, 1995)
- Gets Eaten (June 13, 1995)
- Hops Home (June 13, 1995)
- Inside the Haunted House (September 12, 1995)
- Plays Ball (February 13, 1996)
- Goes to Seed (February 13, 1996)
- Kicks Up a Storm (February 13, 1996)
- Blows Its Top (October 1, 1996)
- Going Batty (October 1, 1996)
- The Busasaurus (April 15, 1997)
- Taking Flight (April 15, 1997)
- Flexes Its Muscles (April 15, 1997)
- Gets Ready, Set, Dough (July 29, 1997)
- Gets Ants in Its Pants (July 29, 1997)
- Getting Energized (February 17, 1998)
- Out of this World (February 17, 1998)
- Butterflies! (April 20, 1999)
- In a Beehive (July 27, 1999)
- Spins a Web (July 27, 1999)
- Under Construction (April 25, 2000)
- In the Rainforest (April 25, 2000)
- Creepy Crawly Fun (August 8, 2000)
- In a Pickle (August 8, 2000)
- Gets Planted (July 3, 2001)
- Makes a Rainbow (July 3, 2001)
- Holiday Special (October 8, 2002)

=== DVDs ===
Each DVD contains three episodes of the series. The following is a list of episodes appearing on each DVD. All of the DVDs are for Region 1. DVDs were released by Warner from 2002 to 2005, and by Scholastic in 2006. Current releases are issued through Cinedigm.

- The Magic School Bus – Bugs, Bugs, Bugs (September 28, 2004, reissued July 31, 2012)
  - Gets Ants in Its Pants
  - In a Beehive
  - Butterfly and the Bog Beast
  - Gains Weight (bonus episode on Cinedigm issue)
- The Magic School Bus – Space Adventures (January 28, 2003, reissued July 31, 2012)
  - Gets Lost in Space
  - Out of This World
  - Taking Flight (only on Warner issue)
  - Gains Weight (only on Cinedigm issue)
  - Plays Ball (bonus episode on Cinedigm issue)
  - Space Explorers (book included with some copies of Cinedigm issue)
- The Magic School Bus – Human Body (September 6, 2005, reissued July 31, 2012)
  - For Lunch
  - Inside Ralphie
  - Flexes Its Muscles
  - Gets Planted (bonus episode on Cinedigm issue)
  - The Search for the Missing Bones (book included with some copies of Cinedigm issue)
- The Magic School Bus: Catches a Wave (September 6, 2005, reissued July 31, 2012)
  - Wet All Over
  - Ups and Downs
  - Rocks and Rolls
  - Goes Upstream (bonus episode on Cinedigm issue)
- The Magic School Bus – Super Sports Fun (September 28, 2004, reissued July 31, 2012)
  - Plays Ball
  - Works Out
  - Shows and Tells
  - Rocks and Rolls (bonus episode on Cinedigm issue)
- The Magic School Bus – Creepy, Crawly Fun! (August 20, 2002, reissued August 7, 2012)
  - In the Haunted House
  - Going Batty
  - Spins a Web
  - Flexes Its Muscles (bonus episode on Cinedigm issue)
- The Magic School Bus – Holiday Special (October 8, 2002, reissued November 13, 2012)
  - Holiday Special
  - In the Arctic (only on Cinedigm issue)
  - In the Rainforest
  - All Dried Up (only on Warner issue)
  - Gets Charged (bonus episode on Cinedigm issue)
- The Magic School Bus – Takes a Dive (9/26/2006)
  - Takes a Dive
  - Gets Swamped
  - Goes to Mussel Beach
  - For Lunch (bonus episode on Cinedigm issue)
  - The Great Shark Escape (book included with some copies of Cinedigm issue)
- The Magic School Bus – Sees Stars (9/26/2006)
  - Sees Stars
  - Gains Weight
  - Goes on Air
- The Magic School Bus – The Busasaurus (7/31/2012)
  - The Busasaurus
  - Cold Feet
  - Goes Upstream
  - Gets Eaten (bonus episode)
- The Magic School Bus – The Food Chain (7/31/2012)
  - Gets Eaten
  - Meets the Rot Squad
  - Gets Ready, Set, Dough
  - Butterfly and the Bog Beast (bonus episode)
- The Magic School Bus – Takes Flight (7/31/2012)
  - Kicks Up a Storm
  - Taking Flight
  - Hops Home
  - Gets Swamped (bonus episode)
- The Magic School Bus – The Complete Series (9/25/2012)
- The Magic School Bus – All About Earth (10/1/2013)
  - Goes to Seed
  - Blows Its Top
  - Goes on Air
  - All Dried Up (bonus episode)
- The Magic School Bus – Cracks a Yolk (1/28/2014)
  - In the City
  - Cracks a Yolk
  - All Dried Up
  - Gets Ants in Its Pants (bonus episode)
- The Magic School Bus – Getting Energized (1/28/2014)
  - Getting Energized
  - Gets Charged
  - Gets a Bright Idea
  - In the Haunted House (bonus episode)
- The Magic School Bus – In a Pickle (1/28/2014)
  - In a Pickle
  - Meets Molly Cule
  - Makes a Stink
  - Meets the Rot Squad (bonus episode)
- The Magic School Bus – Super Star Power (7/31/2012)
  - Gets Planted
  - Goes Cellular
  - Sees Stars
  - Taking Flight (bonus episode)
- The Magic School Bus – Under Construction (9/9/2014)
  - Under Construction
  - Revving Up
  - Gets Programmed
  - Hops Home (bonus episode)
