= Skateland (skating rink) =

Skateland was a skating rink located at 18140 Parthenia Street in Northridge, California. It opened in 1958 and closed in 2020.

== History ==
Roy and Stan Bannister opened Northridge Valley Skateland on January 30, 1958 and the business was purchased by Richard Fleming, a former Sears, Roebuck and Co. executive in 1968. Fleming sold the business to his sons, David and Michael Fleming, ten years later.

Celebrities such as Jerry Lewis, Henry Winkler, Danny Bonaduce, and The Jackson 5 visited Skateland in its early years, and acts such as Ike & Tina Turner, Sonny & Cher, Iron Butterfly, and The Standells played at the rink's dances. Modern celebrities such as Paula Abdul, Stevie Wonder, Tom Cruise, Alec Baldwin, Will Smith, Joan Rivers, Ed Begley Jr., Magic Johnson, and Olivia Newton-John also visited the rink, and Newton-John used the rink to train for her role in Xanadu.

The COVID-19 pandemic forced Skateland to close for eight months. As a result, the Flemings sold the building to Ken Craft, CEO of Hope of the Valley Rescue Mission. With the support of Los Angeles City Council member John Lee, the structure was converted into a 107-bed homeless shelter. The shelter opened on May 12, 2022 as the Trebek Center, named after game show host and humanitarian Alex Trebek, who had donated $100,000 to the project.

== Filming location ==
Skateland used as a filming location for The Office, Promises in the Dark, The Six Million Dollar Man, and a N.E.R.D. music video.
