= List of Animaniacs episodes =

The following is a list of episodes for the Warner Bros. and Amblin Entertainment animated television series Animaniacs. The series first premiered on Fox Kids on September 13, 1993. It would later air on Kids' WB from September 9, 1995, until the series finale aired on November 14, 1998, after 99 episodes.

A feature-length direct-to-video film, Wakko's Wish, was released on December 21, 1999. The series also had a spin-off series Pinky and the Brain, which premiered on September 9, 1995, and concluded on November 14, 1998.

== Series overview ==
Season	Segments	Episodes	Originally released		
Season	Segments	Episodes	First released	Last released	Network
1	171	65	September 13, 1993	May 23, 1994	Fox (Fox Kids)
2	12	4	September 10, 1994	November 12, 1994	Fox (Fox Kids)
3	46	13	September 9, 1995	February 24, 1996	The WB (Kids' WB)
4	22	8	September 7, 1996	November 16, 1996	The WB (Kids' WB)
5	23	9	September 8, 1997	November 14, 1998	The WB (Kids' WB)
Wakko's Wish			December 21, 1999		Direct-to-video

== Episodes ==
The segments in the list are labeled by the starring character(s) as follows:

- (Y) = Yakko, Wakko, and Dot (138 segments)
- (S) = Slappy Squirrel (28 segments)
- (P) = Pinky and the Brain (19 segments)
- (G) = Goodfeathers (15 segments)
- (C) = Chicken Boo (15 segments)
- (B) = Buttons and Mindy (15 segments)
- (R) = Rita and Runt (12 segments)
- (K) = Katie Ka-Boom (7 segments)
- (H) = The Hip Hippos (6 segments)
- (F) = The Flame (3 segments)
- (M) = Minerva Mink (2 segments)
- (O) = One-Shots / Ensembles (28 segments)

This list does not include short interstitial segments such as "Mime Time," "Wheel of Morality," and "Good Idea / Bad Idea."

=== Season 1 (1993–94) ===
No. overall	No. in season	Title	Directed by	Written by	Original release date
1	1	"De-Zanitized" (Y)	Rusty Mills and Dave Marshall	Paul Rugg	September 13, 1993
1	1	"The Monkey Song" (Y)	Gary Hartle and Rich Arons	Written by : Norman Span and Irving Burgie (uncredited respectively); Adapted by : Tom Ruegger	September 13, 1993
1	1	"Nighty-Night Toon" (Y)	Rusty Mills	Nicholas Hollander	September 13, 1993
(1.) Dr. Scratchansniff relates the story of how he first met the Warners after they finally escaped and once tried to make the Warners less zany with psychoanalysis. (2.) In a parody of Harry Belafonte's song "Monkey", the Warners and Dr. Scratchansniff sing about their tumultuous relationship. (3.) In a parody of the children's book Goodnight Moon, each of the Animaniacs characters is wished a good night's sleep.
2	2	"Yakko's World" (Y)	Rusty Mills	Randy Rogel	September 14, 1993
2	2	"Cookies for Einstein" (Y)	Alfred Gimeno	Paul Rugg	September 14, 1993
2	2	"Win Big" (P)	Dave Marshall and Rusty Mills	Story by : Tom Ruegger; Teleplay by : Peter Hastings	September 14, 1993
(1.) Yakko sings a song to the tune of the "Mexican Hat Dance" listing the nations of the world. (2.) As scouts in 1905 Switzerland, the Warners attempt to sell cookies to Albert Einstein, who is too busy trying to discover the mass-energy conversion formula (mistakenly referred to as the formula for his theory of relativity). (3.) Brain competes on the trivia game show Gyp-Parody! to win enough money to buy the final part of a device that he is building to take over the world.
3	3	"H.M.S. Yakko" (Y)	Michael Gerard	Paul Rugg	September 15, 1993
3	3	"Slappy Goes Walnuts" (S)	Jon McClenehan and Spike Brandt	Sherri Stoner	September 15, 1993
3	3	"Yakko's Universe" (Y)	Alfred Gimeno	Randy Rogel	September 15, 1993
(1.) In a parody of H.M.S. Pinafore and The Pirates of Penzance, the Warners run afoul of the evil pirate Captain Mel when they trespass on his private beach. (2.) Slappy tries to get some walnuts in a yard guarded by her nemesis, Doug the Dog, to make walnut fig dough for her nephew Skippy. (3.) Yakko sings a song about the relative vastness of space from one person to the entire universe.
4	4	"Hooked on a Ceiling" (Y)	Rusty Mills	Story by : Tom Ruegger; Teleplay by : Gordon Bressack and Charles M. Howell IV	September 16, 1993
4	4	"Goodfeathers: The Beginning" (G)	Greg Reyna	Deanna Oliver	September 16, 1993
(1.) Michelangelo (here portrayed as a caricature of Kirk Douglas) struggles to finish painting the ceiling of the Sistine Chapel, as he has fired all of his assistants for incompetence. The Warners show up to help, only to repeatedly ruin his hard work by painting over it, as they are offended by all the naked people in his paintings. (2.) Squit is desperate to join the Goodfeathers, and in order to be accepted, he must find the Godpigeon some food. As such, the Goodfeathers, Bobby and Pesto, assist Squit in trying to retrieve a bagel lying in the middle of the street.
5	5	"Taming of the Screwy (Y)"	Alfred Gimeno	Peter Hastings, Earl Kress and Tom Ruegger	September 17, 1993
Plotz is holding a studio gala and has invited over some investors from Tokyo, who are prepared to give the studio $1,000,000,000, and he puts Dr. Scratchansniff in charge of training the Warners to have good manners so that they can attend.
6	6	"Temporary Insanity" (Y)	Michael Gerard	Paul Rugg	September 20, 1993
6	6	"Operation: Lollipop" (B)	Barry Caldwell	Peter Hastings	September 20, 1993
6	6	"What Are We?" (Y)	Michael Gerard	Randy Rogel	September 20, 1993
(Cold open) The Warners parody the opening to Flipper. (1.) When Plotz's secretary falls ill, he tries to dial up a temporary replacement. Unfortunately, he accidentally calls Yakko, Wakko, and Dot, who take the job. (2.) After Mindy receives a lollipop, she gets into trouble when the lollipop sticks to the side of a mail truck and she pursues it, with Buttons in tow trying to keep her safe. (3.) After Dr. Scratchansniff fails to hypnotize the Warners to make them less zany, he questions what they are, leading the Warners to offer a number of suggestions through song.
7	7	"Piano Rag" (Y)	Michael Gerard	Nicholas Hollander	September 21, 1993
7	7	"When Rita Met Runt" (R)	Michael Gerard	Sherri Stoner	September 21, 1993
(1.) Dr. Scratchansniff, Ralph, and Hello Nurse chase after the Warners, so they hide in a piano concert until the coast is clear, where their antics and interruptions quickly begin to irritate the performing pianist. (2.) Rita and Runt meet in an animal shelter, where they decide to bust out and find a real home.
8	8	"The Big Candy Store" (Y)	Jon McClenahan	Story by : Sherri Stoner and Paul Rugg; Teleplay by : Paul Rugg	September 22, 1993
8	8	"Bumbie's Mom" (S)	Jon McClenahan and Barry Caldwell	Sherri Stoner	September 22, 1993
(Cold opening) The Warners star in a parody of the opening to Gilligan's Island detailing their escape from the water tower. (1.) Uptight and ill-mannered candy store owner Ferman Flaxseed is given a hard time when the Warners pay a visit to his candy store. (2.) After Skippy is traumatized by Bumbie's mother's death in Bumbie, the Dearest Deer, Slappy tries to teach him that "no one really dies in cartoons" by having him visit the cartoon actress who played the part, her old friend Vina Walleen.
9	9	"Wally Llama" (Y)	Kirk Tingblad	Paul Rugg	September 23, 1993
9	9	"Where Rodents Dare" (P)	Greg Reyna and Dave Marshall	Peter Hastings and Tom Ruegger	September 23, 1993
(1.) Wally Llama, the wisest creature in the world, vows to stop answering questions after being asked too many stupid ones. However, the Warners have a very pressing question for Wally that really want him to answer. (2.) Brain plans to freeze all the leaders of the world with his new cryogenic gas at an international peace conference in the Swiss Alps.
10	10	"King Yakko (Y)"	Alfred Gimeno and Dave Marshall	Peter Hastings	September 24, 1993
Yakko inherits the throne of Anvilania, a small kingdom best known as the world's largest producer of anvils, and eventually he and his siblings take on the evil Dictator Umlatt of Dunlikus (guest voice: Christopher Guest), who wants to take control of the kingdom.
11	11	"No Pain, No Painting" (Y)	Alfred Gimeno and Dave Marshall	Peter Hastings	September 27, 1993
11	11	"Les Miseranimals" (R)	Gary Hartle and Rich Arons	Deanna Oliver	September 27, 1993
(1.) In 1905, the Warners arrive at the Paris home of the famous artist Pablo Picasso. They want to help him paint and annoy him so much that he decides to let them paint while he relaxes. (2.) Loosely based on the Broadway musical Les Misérables, Runt Val Runt, a rebellious dog in the French Revolution in Paris, helps to liberate Rita and other captured cats from a future of being cooked into pies.
12	12	"Garage Sale of the Century" (Y)	Alfred Gimeno	Story by : Tom Ruegger and Paul Rugg; Teleplay by : Earl Kress	September 28, 1993
12	12	"West Side Pigeons" (G)	Barry Caldwell, Greg Reyna and Dave Marshall	Deanna Oliver	September 28, 1993
(1.) Papa Bear (guest voice: Ed Asner) is having a garage sale where he swindles customers and refuses to give any refunds, but runs into problems when the Warners take the expression too literally and try to buy his garage. (2.) In an avian parody of West Side Story, the Goodfeathers are having a rivalry with a group of sparrows when Squit falls in love with Carloota, the sister of a rival sparrow.
13	13	"Hello Nice Warners" (Y)	Alfred Gimeno	Paul Rugg	September 29, 1993
13	13	"La Behemoth" (H)	Gary Hartle and Dave Marshall	Nicholas Hollander	September 29, 1993
13	13	"Little Old Slappy from Pasadena" (S)	Michael Gerard and Dave Marshall	Tom Minton	September 29, 1993
(1.) While running away from Ralph, the Warners encounter Mr. Director, a Jerry Lewis-inspired comedy director, who hires them for his new film, leading to a clash of comedic styles. Soon, the Warners take over directing, putting Mr. Director through torment by making him an actor. (2.) When their giraffe maid quits over a misunderstanding, the Hip Hippos are forced to do their own housework with disastrous results. (3.) To the famous Jan and Dean song, Slappy speedily drives her brand-new car all over town to deliver a letter.
14	14	"La La Law" (Y)	Michael Gerard and Rich Arons	Paul Rugg	September 30, 1993
14	14	"Cat on a Hot Steel Beam" (B)	Barry Caldwell and Greg Reyna	Barry Caldwell	September 30, 1993
(1.) In a parody of L.A. Law, when Dr. Scratchansniff gets a parking ticket, the Warners act as his lawyers and go to court to fight it (against the wishes of Scratchansniff, who wishes to simply pay the fine), where they frustrate the judge with their hijinks. (2.) Mindy follows a kitten into a dangerous construction site and Buttons follows in an attempt to return her to safety.
15	15	"Space-Probed" (Y)	Gary Hartle, Dave Marshall and Rich Arons	John P. McCann	October 1, 1993
15	15	"Battle for the Planet" (P)	Alfred Gimeno	Peter Hastings	October 1, 1993
(1.) The Warners are abducted by aliens and taken aboard their spaceship, where the aliens attempt to experiment on them. Of course, the Warners' typical hijinks begin to annoy the aliens. (2.) Inspired by the radio drama The War of the Worlds, Brain plans to trick people into thinking that aliens are invading Earth and having them flee the cities in a panic.
16	16	"Chalkboard Bungle" (Y)	Rusty Mills	Story by : Tom Ruegger and Paul Rugg; Teleplay by : Paul Rugg	October 4, 1993
16	16	"Hurray for Slappy" (S)	Rusty Mills	John P. McCann	October 4, 1993
16	16	"The Great Wakkorotti: The Master and His Music" (Y)	Jeffery DeGrandis	Written by : Tom Ruegger; Music adapted by : Russell Brower	October 4, 1993
(1.) The studio hires a new teacher named Miss Flamiel to teach the Warners but despite her best efforts, she meets only with frustration and is unable to teach them anything. (2.) Slappy goes to a banquet held in her honor to receive an award while her old nemeses (Walter Wolf, Sid the Squid, and Beanie the Brain-Dead Bison), jealous of never winning an award themselves, and resentful for all that Slappy has put them through, plot to enact their revenge on her at the banquet. (3.) Wakko, performing as the Great Wakkorotti, belches The Blue Danube by Johann Strauss.
17	17	"Roll Over, Beethoven" (Y)	Michael Gerard	Paul Rugg	October 5, 1993
17	17	"The Cat and the Fiddle" (R)	Alfred Gimeno	Nicholas Hollander	October 5, 1993
(1.) As chimney sweeps, the Warners annoy Ludwig van Beethoven as he struggles to compose his Fifth Symphony. (2.) In 1690s Italy, Antonio Stradivari decides to take in a stray cat so that he can make violin strings out of its "catgut". Unfortunately, for Rita, that stray cat happens to be her.
18	18	"Pavlov's Mice" (P)	Michael Gerard	Story by : John P. McCann, Tom Ruegger and Sherri Stoner; Teleplay by : John P. McCann	October 6, 1993
18	18	"Chicken Boo-Ryshnikov" (C)	Michael Gerard	Deanna Oliver	October 6, 1993
18	18	"Nothing But the Tooth" (Y)	Greg Reyna	Deanna Oliver and Paul Rugg	October 6, 1993
(1.) In turn of the century Russia, Brain plans to steal the crown jewels of Russia during a solar eclipse, but faces one setback: he and Pinky have been conditioned by psychiatrist Ivan Pavlov. (2.) In New York, Chicken Boo is mistaken for a ballet dancer and dances in a performance of Tchaikovsky's Swan Lake. (3.) Rasputin has a toothache, which throws a wrench into his plans of overthrowing Tsar Nicholas II by way of hypnosis. Unfortunately for him, the Warners are his dentists.
19	19	"Meatballs or Consequences" (Y)	Greg Reyna	John P. McCann	October 7, 1993
19	19	"A Moving Experience" (H)	Rusty Mills and Dave Marshall	Peter Hastings	October 7, 1993
(1.) During a visit to Sweden, the Warners run afoul of Death, who tries to bring Wakko to the realm of the dead after he eats one too many Swedish meatballs during a contest. To save him, Yakko and Dot challenge Death to a game of checkers. (2.) The Hip Hippos head to New York to find a trendy new place to live.
20	20	"Hearts of Twilight" (Y)	Alfred Gimeno	Paul Rugg	October 12, 1993
20	20	"The Boids" (G)	Michael Gerard	Deanna Oliver	October 12, 1993
(Cold opening) The Warners parody the opening to Alfred Hitchcock Presents. (1.) In a parody of Apocalypse Now, a crazed Mr. Director (here visually based on Marlon Brando but otherwise still a Jerry Lewis parody) is millions of dollars over budget, so Plotz sends the Warners out to put a stop to his newest production. (2.) The Goodfeathers are hired as stunt birds for The Boids. They try to keep their jobs, but the shoot turns out to be harder than they expected.
21	21	"The Flame" (F)	Barry Caldwell	Story by : Tom Ruegger; Teleplay by : Nicholas Hollander and Tom Ruegger	October 11, 1993
21	21	"Wakko's America" (Y)	Alfred Gimeno	Story by : Tom Ruegger and Paul Rugg; Teleplay by : Gordon Bressack, Charles M. Howell IV and Paul Rugg	October 11, 1993
21	21	"Davy Omelette" (C)	Rusty Mills and Ron Fleischer	Randy Rogel and Tom Ruegger	October 11, 1993
21	21	"Four Score and Seven Migraines Ago" (Y)	Rusty Mills	Deanna Oliver	October 11, 1993
(1.) The Flame lights the room where Thomas Jefferson writes the United States Declaration of Independence. (2.) In a Jeopardy!-style game in Miss Flamiel's classroom, Wakko has to name the 50 states and their capitols, but fails to put his answer in the form of a question, instead putting it in the form of a song to the tune of "Turkey in the Straw". (3.) Chicken Boo is mistaken for the frontiersman Davy Omelette, and helps a number of pioneers who are being attacked by a bear. (4.) On a train to Gettysburg, Pennsylvania, the Warners help Abraham Lincoln write the opening of the Gettysburg Address.
22	22	"Guardin' the Garden" (S)	Michael Gerard and Spike Brandt	Story by : Earl Kress and Tom Ruegger; Teleplay by : Nicholas Hollander and Sherri Stoner	October 13, 1993
22	22	"Plane Pals" (Y)	Rusty Mills and Kirk Tingblad	Story by : Tom Ruegger and John P. McCann; Teleplay by : John P. McCann	October 13, 1993
(1.) When a sly serpent tries to tempt Adam and Eve into eating apples from the Tree of Knowledge in the Garden of Eden, Slappy, who has been put in charge of guarding the apples, resorts to her usual methods of slapstick violence to repeatedly thwart him. (2.) Onboard a plane, the Warners annoy tightwad Ivan Blosky who is forced to sit by them because of a computer error.
23	23	"Be Careful What You Eat" (Y)	–	Randy Rogel (lyrics)	October 15, 1993
23	23	"Up the Crazy River" (B)	Alfred Gimeno	Nicholas Hollander	October 15, 1993
23	23	"Ta Da Dump, Ta Da Dump, Ta Da Dump Dump Dump" (G)	Greg Reyna	Story by : Tom Ruegger; Teleplay by : Charles M. Howell IV	October 15, 1993
(1.) In a musical number, the Warners list off the ingredients in a carton of ice cream and a candy bar. (2.) When Mindy chases a butterfly into a rain forest that is being cut down for wood, Buttons follows and attempts to protect her. (3.) Bobby and Squit must help Pesto when he gets his head caught in a plastic six-pack ring while rummaging through garbage.
24	24	"Yakko's World of Baldness" (Y)	—	—	October 18, 1993
24	24	"Opportunity Knox" (P)	Michael Gerard	Tom Minton	October 18, 1993
24	24	"Wings Take Heart" (O)	Alfred Gimeno	Nicholas Hollander	October 18, 1993
(Cold opening) Yakko stars in a parody of the Hair Club for Men advertisements, promoting his new, easily-affordable hair removal service. (1.) Brain plans to steal all of the gold in Fort Knox as part of his latest plan to take over the world. (2.) When a moth and a butterfly fall in love, they head to the city, where they brave through several endangering situations so as to not be separated from one another.
25	25	"Disasterpiece Theatre" (Y)	—	—	October 19, 1993
25	25	"Hercule Yakko" (Y)	Rusty Mills and Dave Marshall	Peter Hastings	October 19, 1993
25	25	"Home on De-Nile" (R)	Rusty Mills	Stephen Hibbert	October 19, 1993
25	25	"A Midsummer Night's Dream" (Y)	Rusty Mills	Deanna Oliver	October 19, 1993
(Cold opening) In a parody of Masterpiece Theatre, Yakko presents a series of disasters. (1.) In a parody of Agatha Christie's works, Yakko, presenting himself as "Hercule Yakko", joins his siblings/assistants in search of Marita's missing jewel on a cruise ship filled with "the unusual suspects" (Slappy, Minerva, and Pinky and the Brain). (2.) Rita gets adopted by Cleopatra, and Runt saves her after he finds out that Rita is about to be sacrificed. (3.) The Warners perform a unique interpretation of William Shakespeare's A Midsummer Night's Dream, with Dot serving as translator for viewers "who, like Yakko, have no idea what he's saying".
26	26	"Testimonials" (Y)	–	–	October 21, 1993
26	26	"Babblin' Bijou" (Y)	Jeffery DeGrandis	Tom Minton	October 21, 1993
26	26	"Potty Emergency" (Y)	Rusty Mills	Paul Rugg	October 21, 1993
26	26	"Sir Yaksalot" (Y)	Barry Caldwell	Paul Rugg	October 21, 1993
(Wraparounds.) Several old-time film stars talk about their encounters with the Warners, and how Milton Berle grew to hate Yakko. (1.) An old black-and-white cartoon where Dot goes into films (literally) to find the man of her dreams. (2.) In the midst of watching "Brain Eaters" at the cinema with his siblings, Wakko drinks too much soda and scrambles throughout the city to find an available bathroom. Even after he finds a toilet in his "gag bag", his quest to relieve himself goes from bad to worse when he cannot find any privacy. (3.) When a colossal, fire-breathing dragon terrorizes Camelot, King Arthur (portrayed as a caricature of Richard Harris) seeks the bravest knight to save the kingdom, but winds up with the Warners instead.
27	27	"You Risk Your Life" (Y)	Alfred Gimeno	Paul Rugg	October 25, 1993
27	27	"I Got Yer Can" (S)	Alfred Gimeno	Sherri Stoner	October 25, 1993
27	27	"Jockey for Position" (P)	Lenord Robinson and Dave Marshall	Peter Hastings	October 25, 1993
(1.) Yakko hosts a game show that parodies Groucho Marx's You Bet Your Life. (2.) A discarded soda can sparks an escalating, one-sided battle of wits between Slappy and her conceited neighbor, Candie Chipmunk. (3.) To win funds for his latest world-conquering scheme, Brain enters the Kentucky Derby, but Pinky's meddling alters the outcome of the race in an unexpected manner.
28	28	"Moby or Not Moby" (Y)	Michael Gerard	John P. McCann	October 26, 1993
28	28	"Mesozoic Mindy" (B)	Greg Reyna	Nicholas Hollander	October 26, 1993
28	28	"The Good, the Boo and the Ugly" (C)	Greg Reyna	Deanna Oliver, Nicholas Hollander, Peter Hastings and Paul Rugg	October 26, 1993
(1.) The Warners protect the legendary Moby-Dick from the wrath of Captain Ahab. (2.) In the Stone Age, cavegirl Mindy gets in trouble and Buttons rescues her. (3.) Boo finds himself as a sheriff in the midst of a spaghetti Western.
29	29	"Draculee, Draculaa" (Y)	Michael Gerard and Byron Vaughns	John P. McCann	October 29, 1993
29	29	"Phranken-Runt" (R)	Michael Gerard	John P. McCann	October 29, 1993
(1.) In an attempt to head towards their "ancestral home" of Pennsylvania (since their parents are the pencils that drew them), the Warners end up at the estate of Count Dracula (guest voice: Dan Castellaneta) in Transylvania. (2.) Rita and Runt are being chased by Dr. Phrankenstein, a mad scientist who wants the idiot dog's brain for her own experiments.
30	30	"Hot, Bothered and Bedeviled" (Y)	Rusty Mills	Story by : Tom Ruegger; Teleplay by : John P. McCann	October 28, 1993
30	30	"Moon Over Minerva" (M)	Alfred Gimeno	Nicholas Hollander	October 28, 1993
30	30	"Skullhead Boneyhands" (O)	Michael Gerard	Deanna Oliver	October 28, 1993
(1.) Lost once again while trying to get to the fictional Six Flags over Flushing, the Warners end up in the fiery realm of Hades, where they end up giving Satan (guest voice: Ron Perlman) his own eternal torment. (2.) A melancholic Minerva avoids the come-ons of geeky Wilford Wolf (guest voice: Peter Scolari), until the full moon brings out the real wolf in both of them. (3.) In a parody of Tim Burton's Edward Scissorhands, Mr. Skullhead is adopted and finds acceptance in a suburban family.
31	31	"O Silly Mio" (Y)	Gary Hartle, Audu Paden and Dave Marshall	Randy Rogel and Paul Rugg	November 1, 1993
31	31	"Puttin' on the Blitz" (R)	Greg Reyna	Story by : Tom Ruegger and Nicholas Hollander; Teleplay by : Nicholas Hollander	November 1, 1993
31	31	"The Great Wakkorotti: The Summer Concert" (Y)	Jeffery DeGrandis	Written by : Tom Ruegger; Music adapted by : Russell Brower (uncredited)	November 1, 1993
(1.) After their stained-glass window is destroyed by opera singer Madame Bruntwind's vocal rehearsals, the Warners torment her during a performance of Carmen. (2.) In the midst of the Nazi invasion of Poland, Rita and Runt help a little girl named Katrina reunite with her father while avoiding the enemy troops and their guard dog Schnappsie (played by Newt in a guest appearance). (3.) Wakko, performing as the Great Wakkorotti, belches Amilcare Ponchielli's Dance of the Hours.
32	32	"Chairman of the Bored" (Y)	Rusty Mills and Chris Brandt	Tom Minton, Tom Ruegger, Paul Rugg and Sherri Stoner	November 2, 1993
32	32	"Planets Song" (Y)	Rusty Mills	Paul Rugg	November 2, 1993
32	32	"Astro-Buttons" (B)	Gary Hartle and Rich Arons	Nicholas Hollander	November 2, 1993
(1.) The Warners are tortured going through the longest, most boring one-sided conversation of their lives, courtesy of a drone-voiced man, Francis "Pip" Pumphandle (guest voice: Ben Stein), whom they meet at a party. (2.) Yakko sings about the planets in the Solar System. (3.) Buttons and Mindy are part of a space colony, and Buttons goes after Mindy when she chases after her ball.
33	33	"Cartoons in Wakko's Body" (Y)	–	–	November 3, 1993
33	33	"Noah's Lark" (H)	Greg Reyna	Nicholas Hollander (as Shecky Hollander), Tom Ruegger (as Dr. Plotz Ruegger) and Sherri Stoner (as Boom-Boom Stoner)	November 3, 1993
33	33	"The Big Kiss" (C)	Alfred Gimeno	Deanna Oliver	November 3, 1993
33	33	"Hiccup" (G)	Dave Marshall	Deanna Oliver	November 3, 1993
(Wraparounds.) In a running gag throughout the episode, Wakko has various medical maladies caused by cartoons that are inside him. (1.) Noah (here portrayed as a caricature of Richard Lewis) is instructed by God to build an ark for the Great Flood and gather animals two-by-two, including the Hip Hippos. (2.) Boo is a leading actor who delivers the money shot kiss in a film, without anyone knowing that he is a giant chicken. (3.) Squit gets a case of the hiccups, forcing the other Goodfeathers to come up with different ways to get rid of them.
34	34	"Clown and Out" (Y)	Alfred Gimeno	Nicholas Hollander and Paul Rugg	November 4, 1993
34	34	"Bubba Bo Bob Brain" (P)	Gary Hartle, Audu Paden and Dave Marshall	Sherri Stoner	November 4, 1993
(1.) Mr. Plotz hires a clown (who looks and sounds like the Jerry Lewis-esque Mr. Director) for Wakko's birthday party, but Plotz learns from Dr. Scratchansniff that, like him, Wakko has a bad fear of clowns, resulting in the clown being battered and bruised every time he tries to greet Wakko. (2.) Brain becomes a country-western music star, with the intent of using subliminal messages in his music to help him achieve world domination. But the main problem in his rise to fame: Pinky keeps screwing up his stage name.
35	35	"Very Special Opening" (Y)	–	–	November 5, 1993
35	35	"In the Garden of Mindy" (B) (P)	Greg Reyna	John P. McCann	November 5, 1993
35	35	"No Place Like Homeless" (R) (G)	Greg Reyna	John P. McCann	November 5, 1993
35	35	"Katie Ka-Boo" (K) (C)	Greg Reyna	Nicholas Hollander and Deanna Oliver	November 5, 1993
35	35	"Baghdad Cafe" (Y) (S)	Lenord Robinson	John P. McCann	November 5, 1993
(Cold opening and wraparounds.) The Warners announce that this will be a very special episode because all of the usual character pairings have been mixed up. They sing the song "Animaniacs Stew" as they mix up the pairings. (1.) Brain ends up replacing Buttons, as he tries to prepare a plan for world domination, all the while watching over Mindy's mischief. Back at the lab, Pinky has to share the cage with Rita, and is swallowed whole. (2.) Runt and Pesto find a home with a kind old woman who does not like pigeons. (3.) Katie discovers the hard way that her boyfriend is actually Chicken Boo. (4.) Dot and Slappy switch places, as Dot loses her temper after being called "Dottie", while the Warners (and Slappy) mistake the palace of Sodarn Hinsane (a parody of Saddam Hussein) for the fictional Baghdad Cafe.
36	36	"Critical Condition" (S)	Audu Paden and Jon McClenahan	Tom Ruegger	November 8, 1993
36	36	"The Three Muska-Warners" (Y)	Audu Paden	Sherri Stoner	November 8, 1993
(1.) After film critics Hisskill and Eggbert (parodies of Siskel & Ebert) lambast her cartoons on their television show, Slappy decides to get revenge: first by blowing up their home, then by sabotaging a pre-screening that the critics are attending. (Includes clips from the Warner Bros. shorts What's Opera, Doc?, Duck Amuck, and Porky in Wackyland.) (2.) In France, the Warners, as the Three Musketeers, protect the cowardly King Henry III from the threat of "the Viper", who is slated to arrive at the royal palace at 11:30 PM.
37	37	"Dough Dough Boys" (G)	Greg Reyna	Story by : John P. McCann and Tom Ruegger; Teleplay by : John P. McCann	November 9, 1993
37	37	"Boot Camping" (Y)	Rusty Mills	Nicholas Hollander and John P. McCann	November 9, 1993
37	37	"General Boo-Regard" (C)	Alfred Gimeno	Deanna Oliver and John P. McCann	November 9, 1993
(1.) The Goodfeathers, as carrier pigeons, deliver an important message through a World War I battlefield. (2.) The Warners head for summer camp but wind up in basic training instead, leading to chaos, confusion, and their drill instructor (guest voice: Ron Perlman) being continuously tormented. (3.) Chicken Boo, as "General Boo-regard", leads the Southern Rebels of the American Civil War.
38	38	"Spell-Bound" (P)	Rusty Mills and Dave Marshall	John P. McCann	November 10, 1993
In a fantasy tale, Pinky and the Brain go on a quest to obtain the toenail of a dragon - the last ingredient that they need for a magic spell needed to help them take over the world.
39	39	"Smitten with Kittens" (R)	Alfred Gimeno and Dave Marshall	Deanna Oliver	November 11, 1993
39	39	"Alas Poor Skullhead" (Y)	–	–	November 11, 1993
39	39	"White Gloves" (Y)	Rusty Mills	Nicholas Hollander	November 11, 1993
(1.) Rita and Runt find a litter of "puppies" that cling to the stray cat as their mother. (2.) Yakko recites a monologue from William Shakespeare's Hamlet, while Wakko plays Horatio, and Dot provides translation for viewers "who, like Yakko, have no idea what he's saying". (3.) As Wakko plays piano in the water tower, his gloves run off and have an adventure of their own.
40	40	"Fair Game" (Y)	Bob Kline	Peter Hastings	November 12, 1993
40	40	"The Slapper" (S)	–	–	November 12, 1993
40	40	"Puppet Rulers" (P)	Barry Caldwell and Dave Marshall	Story by : Peter Hastings; Teleplay by : Tom Minton	November 12, 1993
(Cold opening) Dot stars in a parody of a scene from Casablanca. (1.) The Warners are contestants on the game show "Quiz Me Quick", where they drive host Ned Flat (guest voice: Harry Shearer) insane with their antics. (2.) Slappy stars in a parody of the infomercial for The Clapper, advertising a device that, on cue, slaps anyone who annoys the user. (3.) In the 1950s, Pinky and Brain join the cast of a kids' puppet show called Time for Meany to influence the baby-boomer generation to follow them in the future.
41	41	"Buttermilk, It Makes a Body Bitter" (S)	–	–	November 15, 1993
41	41	"Broadcast Nuisance" (Y)	Greg Reyna and Kirk Tingblad	Gordon Bressack and Charles M. Howell IV	November 15, 1993
41	41	"Raging Bird" (G)	Lenord Robinson	Deanna Oliver	November 15, 1993
(1.) Slappy stars in a buttermilk ad that parodies the Dairy Promotion Program's "Milk: It Does A Body Good" ad campaign. (2.) TV news anchor Dan Anchorman (guest voice: Phil Hartman) refuses to tip the Warners for his lunch delivery, leading to one on-the-air humiliation after another. (Note: Several edits were made to the episode after its initial airing, at the insistence of executive producer Steven Spielberg; this included the anchor's name being changed to "Dan Anchorman" in place of the more suggestive "Slam Fondlesome", the removal of a "makeup department" scene that was deemed too violent/cruel, leading to other scenes needing to be redubbed, and the removal of a Slappy Squirrel cameo where she blows Dan up with a bomb). (3.) Bobby trains to fight a tough bird to impress a beautiful bird in his fighting ability.
42	42	"Animator's Alley" (Y)	–	–	November 16, 1993
42	42	"Can't Buy a Thrill" (H)	Michael Gerard and Dave Marshall	Peter Hastings	November 16, 1993
42	42	"Hollywoodchuck" (O)	Greg Reyna	Paul Rugg	November 16, 1993
(Wraparounds.) The Warners are stuck on a forum show with an old Warner Bros. animator named Cappy "Cap" Barnhouse, who keeps falling asleep as he reminisces about his time at the studio. (1.) The Hip Hippos try to improve their boring lives by going on a dangerous vacation. (2.) Charlton "Baynarts" Woodchuck leaves his home in Kansas to become an actor in Hollywood, where he lands the titular role in a film titled "Franklin the Friendly Woodchuck". Unfortunately, he is constantly and severely injured on set while filming.
43	43	"Of Nice and Men" (R)	Michael Gerard	Randy Rogel and Sherri Stoner	November 17, 1993
43	43	"What a Dump" (B)	Barry Caldwell	Randy Rogel	November 17, 1993
43	43	"Survey Ladies" (Y)	Rusty Mills	Deanna Oliver and Sherri Stoner	November 17, 1993
(1.) Runt gets adopted and finds himself taking care of a rabbit farm, while Rita is relegated to rat hunting. (2.) Buttons chases Mindy through a landfill and recycling center when she tries to retrieve her favorite old doll, which has been thrown out with the trash. (3.) While trying to find a birthday present for Dr. Scratchansniff at the mall, the Warners keep running into two relentless and persistent survey ladies who ask them questions about beans and George Wendt.
44	44	"Useless Facts" (Y)	–	–	November 18, 1993
44	44	"The Senses Song" (Y)	Greg Reyna	Story by : Tom Ruegger; Music and lyrics by : Randy Rogel	November 18, 1993
44	44	"The World Can Wait" (P)	Alfred Gimeno	Peter Hastings	November 18, 1993
44	44	"Kiki's Kitten" (R)	Gary Hartle and Audu Paden	Deanna Oliver	November 18, 1993
(Wraparounds.) Yakko reveals pieces of completely useless information. (1.) The Warners sing about the senses – the usual five, plus several others. (2.) Brain gives up his world domination plans for one night so that he can woo Billie, who is, it turns out, more attracted to Pinky than to him. (3.) A research gorilla unexpectedly adopts Rita, while Runt just sleeps through the whole thing.
45	45	"Windsor Hassle" (Y)	Alfred Gimeno, Jon McClenahan and Jeff Siergey	Lisa Malone, Kate Donohue and Paul Rugg	November 19, 1993
45	45	"...And Justice for Slappy" (S)	Rusty Mills and Jon McClenahan	John P. McCann	November 19, 1993
(Cold opening) Dot stars in a parody of the opening to The Mary Tyler Moore Show. (1.) The Warners work with Elizabeth II to restore Windsor Castle after the 1992 fire that destroyed it. (2.) Walter Wolf takes Slappy to court, accusing her of assaulting him. Worse yet, the court seems to be stacked against Slappy, with Walter even lying under oath at the witness stand by telling a distorted version of the events that took place when he was supposedly assaulted.
46	46	"Turkey Jerky" (Y)	Gary Hartle	Peter Hastings and Tom Ruegger	November 22, 1993
46	46	"Wild Blue Yonder" (O)	Alfred Gimeno	Nicholas Hollander	November 22, 1993
(1.) After the Pilgrims arrive on Plymouth Rock and decide to have a feast, Myles Standish announces he will hunt down a turkey for the main course. He soon clashes with the Native American Warners when he tries to shoot their pet turkey, Mr. Gobble. (2.) A newly-hatched baby bird chases after a stealth bomber that it mistakes for its mother.
47	47	"Video Review" (Y)	Michael Gerard	Randy Rogel, Sherri Stoner and Tom Minton	November 23, 1993
47	47	"When Mice Ruled the Earth" (P)	Greg Reyna	Gordon Bressack	November 23, 1993
(1.) In a parody of the Daffy Duck short Book Revue, set in a video store, the covers of all the VHS tapes come to life after closing time, including the Warners, who leap out of the cover of an Animaniacs VHS. The three of them have a bit of fun throughout the store, but soon run into trouble when they have to evade an angry Tyrannosaurus rex that emerges from the cover of a copy of Jurassic Park. (2.) Pinky and Brain go back to the dawn of time to influence the evolution of mice and give them evolutionary advantages over mankind so that the duo can rule the world.
48	48	"Mobster Mash" (Y)	Greg Reyna and Dave Marshall	Nicholas Hollander	November 24, 1993
48	48	"Lake Titicaca" (Y)	–	Tom Ruegger	November 24, 1993
48	48	"Icebreakers" (R)	Lenord Robinson	Nicholas Hollander	November 24, 1993
(1.) The Warners get into a battle of with Mafia boss Don Pepperoni (a parody of (Vito Corleone) at his favorite Italian restaurant when he catches them sitting in his private booth. (2.) The Warners sing about Lake Titicaca, solely because they "really like saying its name". (3.) Rita and Runt stow away to Florida, but end up in Alaska, where Ross Perot recruits Runt for his presidential campaign.
49	49	"Slippin' on the Ice" (Y)	—	—	November 29, 1993
49	49	"'Twas the Day Before Christmas" (S)	Rusty Mills	Randy Rogel and Tom Ruegger	November 29, 1993
49	49	"Jingle Boo" (C)	Greg Reyna	Deanna Oliver	November 29, 1993
49	49	"The Great Wakkorotti: The Holiday Concert" (Y)	Jeffery DeGrandis	Written by : Tom Ruegger; Music adapted by : Russell Brower (uncredited)	November 29, 1993
49	49	"Toy Shop Terror" (Y)	Jenny Lerew and Dave Marshall	Tom Minton	November 29, 1993
49	49	"Yakko's Universe" (Y)	Alfred Gimeno	Randy Rogel	November 29, 1993
(Cold opening) The Warners perform the song "Slippin' on the Ice", a parody of the title song from Singin' in the Rain. (1.) In a parody of 'Twas the Night Before Christmas, Slappy tells Skippy a story about the studio's plans to deliver Christmas presents to the Warners, with Ralph the Guard standing in for Santa Claus. (2.) Chicken Boo disguises himself as Santa Claus in a department store. (3.) Wakko, performing as the Great Wakkorotti, belches "Jingle Bells". (4.) The Warners run amok at a toy store late at night, and must evade a giant security robot that is activated by the owner sleeping upstairs. (5., repeat) Yakko sings a song about the relative vastness of space from one person to the entire universe.
50	50	"A Christmas Plotz" (Y)	Rusty Mills	Randy Rogel and Paul Rugg	December 6, 1993
50	50	"Little Drummer Warners" (Y)	Lenord Robinson	Earl Kress and Tom Ruegger (adaption)	December 6, 1993
(1.) A Warner version of Charles Dickens' A Christmas Carol, with the Warners as the three spirits, Plotz as Ebenezer Scrooge, Slappy as Jacob Marley, and Ralph as Bob Cratchit; Plotz fires Ralph just before Christmas, leading to the Warners appearing before Plotz one after another to show him the error of his ways and warn him of the fate that will befall him if he keeps on his path. (2.) A retelling of the birth of Jesus, set to several familiar carols. The Warners (as shepherds) deliver their own spin on "We Three Kings" and jazz up "The Little Drummer Boy".
51	51	"Branimaniacs" (S)	–	–	February 10, 1994
51	51	"The Warners and the Beanstalk" (Y)	Barry Caldwell	Deanna Oliver	February 10, 1994
51	51	"Frontier Slappy" (S)	Alfred Gimeno and Jeff Siergey	John P. McCann	February 10, 1994
(1.) Slappy and Skippy star in an advertisement for a new breakfast cereal called "Branimaniacs", but it proves to be a less-than-pleasant cereal that is especially rough on the digestive system. (2.) The Warners get carried up a beanstalk where they come across a golden harp and a goose that lays golden eggs. They soon come face to face with a hungry giant (played by Ralph). To get him to eat something other than them, the Warners pester him to eat "gold eggs and meat" in a style similar to Dr. Seuss' Green Eggs and Ham. (3.) Slappy finds herself facing pioneer Daniel Boone, who wants to cut down her tree to build his house.
52	52	"Ups and Downs" (Y)	Bob Kline	Paul Rugg	February 11, 1994
52	52	"The Brave Little Trailer" (O)	Lenord Robinson	Tom Minton	February 11, 1994
52	52	"Yes, Always" (P)	Michael Gerard and Dave Marshall	Peter Hastings	February 11, 1994
(1.) Dr. Scratchansniff's patience is tested when he gets stuck in a broken elevator for several hours with Wakko. (2.) In a parody of The Brave Little Toaster, a small trailer has to defend his home against tornadoes while avoiding the grasp of a hungry steam shovel. (3.) A documentary on voice acting sees the Brain re-enacting the infamous Orson Welles Frozen Peas TV commercial meltdown.
53	53	"Drive-Insane" (Y)	Rusty Mills	Earl Kress and Paul Rugg	February 14, 1994
53	53	"Girlfeathers" (G)	Greg Reyna	Deanna Oliver	February 14, 1994
53	53	"I'm Cute" (Y)	Rusty Mills	Randy Rogel	February 14, 1994
(1.) Dr. Scratchansniff's date at a drive-in theater gets out of hand when the Warners join him. (2.) The Girlfeathers, who are the "girlfriends" of the Goodfeathers, take some alone time by flying to the Grand Canyon, but the boys keep chasing them the whole way, despite Squit's skepticism. (3.) Dot sings a song about how cute she is, while her brothers slowly get sick of the whole spectacle.
54	54	"Brain Meets Brawn" (P)	Michael Gerard	Peter Hastings and Tom Minton	February 15, 1994
54	54	"Meet Minerva" (M)	Barry Caldwell and Kirk Tingblad	Sherri Stoner	February 15, 1994
(1.) In the late 1800s, Brain drinks Dr. Jekyll's potion as part of a scheme to take over the British Empire, and then the world. (2.) Newt the dog tries to capture Minerva for his mink-hunting owner, but her feminine charms constantly distract him.
55	55	"Gold Rush" (Y)	Michael Gerard and Dave Marshall	Randy Rogel	February 16, 1994
55	55	"A Gift of Gold" (B)	Michael Gerard	Nicholas Hollander	February 16, 1994
55	55	"Dot's Quiet Time" (Y)	Michael Gerard	Nicholas Hollander	February 16, 1994
(1.) The Warners take revenge on a prospector named Jake (guest voice: Michael McKean), who steals their entire wealth during the 1840s gold rush in California. (2.) The trials and tribulations of a piece of gold wrapping paper are shown. (3.) Dot sings while trying to find a quiet and peaceful place to read.
56	56	"Schnitzelbank" (Y)	Greg Reyna	Randy Rogel and Paul Rugg	February 17, 1994
56	56	"The Helpinki Formula" (P)	Audu Paden and Dave Marshall	Gordon Bressack	February 17, 1994
56	56	"Les Boutons et le Ballon" (B)	Barry Caldwell	Sherri Stoner	February 17, 1994
56	56	"Kung Boo" (C)	Audu Paden	Deanna Oliver	February 17, 1994
(1.) The Warners sing the "International Friendship Song" in Germany with their friend, Professor Otto Von Schnitzelpusskrankengescheitmeir. (2.) Brain concocts a mystery formula and sells it through TV infomercials as part of his latest plan to take the world. (3.) Buttons chases Mindy across Paris as she tries to catch a balloon. (4.) In a parody of The Karate Kid, Chicken Boo enters a martial-arts championship match. Note: This episode uses the French dub of the Animaniacs opening theme.
57	57	"Of Course, You Know This Means Warners" (Y)	Lenord Robinson and Dave Marshall	Tom Minton	February 18, 1994
57	57	"Up a Tree" (R)	Greg Reyna	Deanna Oliver	February 18, 1994
57	57	"Wakko's Gizmo" (Y)	Rusty Mills and Dave Marshall	Peter Hastings	February 18, 1994
(1.) A 1942 film of the Warners shows off their assistance on the homefront during World War II. (2.) Rita finds herself stuck up a giant tree in the middle of Nebraska with a case of acrophobia and Runt barking below her. (3.) Wakko shows off a large, complex and bizarre Rube Goldberg machine to his siblings.
58	58	"Meet John Brain" (P)	Greg Reyna and Kirk Tingblad	Peter Hastings	February 28, 1994
58	58	"Smell Ya Later" (S)	Rich Arons and Lenord Robinson	Earl Kress and Tom Ruegger	February 28, 1994
(1.) Brain runs for president as part of his latest plan to take over the world. (2.) Slappy faces off against her smelly old rival Stinkbomb D. Bassett (guest voice: Jonathan Winters) to get some nuts.
59	59	"Ragamuffins" (Y)	Barry Caldwell and Jon McClenahan	Tom Minton	March 1, 1994
59	59	"Woodstock Slappy" (S)	Audu Paden	John P. McCann and Tom Ruegger	March 1, 1994
(1.) An old silent cartoon where the Warner get jobs in a bakery and try to eat everything in sight, while the bakery owner repeatedly tries to enforce the strict rule that prohibits employees from eating the baked goods for sale. (2.) In 1969, Slappy and Skippy head for their summer cottage in Woodstock, New York, but find themselves in the middle of the Woodstock Music Festival.
60	60	"Karaoke-Dokie" (Y)	Rusty Mills and Jon McClenahan	Peter Hastings	March 2, 1994
60	60	"Cranial Crusader" (P)	Rusty Mills and Dave Marshall	Tom Minton	March 2, 1994
60	60	"The Chicken Who Loved Me" (C)	Audu Paden	Deanna Oliver	March 2, 1994
(1.) The Warners want a turn singing at karaoke, but are held up by the dull-singing Willie Slakmer (a parody of William Shatner) who has booked dozens of performance slots. (2.) Pinky and the Brain become Batman and Robin-style superheroes in an attempt to gain recognition. (3.) Chicken Boo stars in a parody of James Bond.
61	61	"Baloney and Kids" (Y)	Michael Gerard and Dave Marshall	Peter Hastings	May 2, 1994
61	61	"Super Buttons" (B)	Lenord Robinson	Nicholas Hollander	May 2, 1994
61	61	"Katie Ka-Boom: The Driving Lesson" (K)	Audu Paden	Nicholas Hollander	May 2, 1994
(1.) The Warners are stuck on a kids' show with the jolly dinosaur Baloney (a parody of Barney the Dinosaur), who gleefully takes all their abuse no matter what they do to him. (2.) Mindy and Buttons are seen as superheroes. (3.) Katie's dad makes a big mistake when he allows Katie to drive the family car home.
62	62	"Scare Happy Slappy" (S)	Michael Gerard and Jeff Siergey	John P. McCann	May 3, 1994
62	62	"Witch One" (R)	Rusty Mills	John P. McCann	May 3, 1994
62	62	"MacBeth" (Y)	Michael Gerard and Jon McClenahan	Deanna Oliver	May 3, 1994
(1.) Slappy takes Skippy out trick-or-treating on Halloween along a suburban block that includes the homes of all her old enemies, Walter Wolf, Sid the Squid, and Beanie the Brain-Dead Bison. (2.) In colonial Salem, Massachusetts, Rita and Runt are chased by an overzealous judge who thinks that Rita is a witch. (3.) Dot, Slappy, and Hello Nurse act out the Three Witches' scene from Act IV of MacBeth, with Yakko translating for viewers "who, like Dot, Slappy, and Hello Nurse, have no idea what they're saying".
63	63	"With Three You Get Eggroll" (G)	Greg Reyna and Dave Marshall	Deanna Oliver	May 9, 1994
63	63	"Mermaid Mindy" (B)	Alfred Gimeno	Nicholas Hollander	May 9, 1994
63	63	"Katie Ka-Boom: Call Waiting" (K)	Greg Reyna and Dave Marshall	Nicholas Hollander	May 9, 1994
(1.) Pesto has to watch his sister Sasha's egg, but it starts rolling all over town. (2.) Mindy and Buttons are merpeople under the sea, and Mindy wanders off as usual. (3.) Katie's dad forgets to take a message from one of her friends. Absent: The Warner Siblings
64	64	"Lookit the Fuzzy Heads" (Y)	Barry Caldwell and Dave Marshall	Peter Hastings	May 16, 1994
64	64	"No Face Like Home" (S)	Rusty Mills	John P. McCann	May 16, 1994
(1.) Dr. Scratchansniff holds a group therapy session with the Warners and Elmyra Duff, but Elmyra's behavior drives them crazy. To escape, the Warners trick her into chasing Mindy, then let her take all the pain that Buttons usually endures while keeping the toddler safe. (2.) Slappy goes to get plastic surgery, but Walter Wolf disguises himself as the surgeon in an attempt to intentionally botch her operation.
65	65	"The Warners' 65th Anniversary Special" (Y)	Alfred Gimeno	Tom Ruegger, Paul Rugg and Sherri Stoner	May 23, 1994
A "live" special highlighting the anniversary of the Warners' creation, from their original roles as sidekicks to the early Looney Tunes character Buddy through their golden age and their occasional breakouts prior to recent times. Behind the scenes, though, a mysterious adversary (later revealed to be Buddy, who seeks revenge for the Warners destroying his career) is plotting their demise.

=== Season 2 (1994) ===
No. overall	No. in season	Title	Directed by	Written by	Original release date
66	1	"Take My Siblings Please" (Y)	Michael Gerard	Paul Rugg	September 10, 1994
66	1	"The Mindy 500" (B)	Michael Gerard	John P. McCann	September 10, 1994
66	1	"Morning Malaise" (Y)	Alfred Gimeno and Dave Marshall	Nicholas Hollander	September 10, 1994
(1.) In a take on Three Billy Goats Gruff, the Warners attempt to cross over a "troll bridge" between them and a nearby meadow. (2.) Mindy follows a clown-painted race car onto the track at the Indianapolis 500. (3.) The Warners annoy rude radio show host Howie Tern and challenge him to out-heckle them.
67	2	"We're No Pigeons" (G)	Alfred Gimeno	Deanna Oliver	September 17, 1994
67	2	"Whistle Stop Mindy" (B)	Greg Reyna	Tom Minton	September 17, 1994
67	2	"Katie Ka-Boom: The Broken Date" (K)	Gary Hartle	Nicholas Hollander	September 17, 1994
(1.) The Goodfeathers trick a hungry young owl into believing that they are not pigeons. (2.) Mindy follows a train to blow its whistle. (3.) Katie gets angry when her date does not arrive on time.
68	3	"Miami Mama-Mia" (G)	Alfred Gimeno	Deanna Oliver	November 5, 1994
68	3	"Pigeon on the Roof" (G)	Jenny Lerew	Deanna Oliver	November 5, 1994
(1.) The Goodfeathers fly to Miami to visit and Pesto's mother and her fiancé Steven Seagull, but Pesto tries to put him out of commission to stop the wedding. (2.) In a musical parody of Fiddler on the Roof, the Goodfeathers try to determine their relationship with the Girlfeathers, who want to settle down, while they just want to hang around their Martin Scorsese statue and Pesto dreams of becoming the Godpigeon.
69	4	"I'm Mad" (Y)	Rich Arons, Audu Paden and Dave Marshall	Story by : Tom Ruegger; Music and lyrics by : Randy Rogel	November 12, 1994
69	4	"Bad Mood Bobby" (G)	Audu Paden	Deanna Oliver	November 12, 1994
69	4	"Katie Ka-Boom: The Blemish" (K)	Gary Hartle	Nicholas Hollander	November 12, 1994
69	4	"Fake" (Y)	Alfred Gimeno	Paul Rugg	November 12, 1994
(1.) Yakko and Dot bicker constantly while Wakko keeps complaining as Dr. Scratchansniff gets them ready for a car trip (originally released theatrically with Don Bluth's Thumbelina). (2.) Pesto and Squit try to get Bobby out of his bad mood. (3.) Katie freaks out when she gets a pimple before her study group starts. (4.) The Warners try to prove to Dr. Scratchansniff that professional wrestling is fake.

=== Season 3 (1995–96) ===
No. overall	No. in season	Title	Directed by	Written by	Original release date
70	1	"Super Strong Warner Siblings" (Y)	Audu Paden	Paul Rugg	September 9, 1995
70	1	"Nutcracker Slappy" (S)	Al Zegler	Earl Kress	September 9, 1995
70	1	"Wakko's New Gookie" (Y)	Audu Paden	Paul Rugg	September 9, 1995
70	1	"A Quake, A Quake!" (Y)	Al Zegler	Randy Rogel	September 9, 1995
(1.) In a parody of Mighty Max and Mighty Morphin Power Rangers, the Warners fight a giant insect that is destroying the Warner Studio. (2.) Slappy and Skippy resort to extreme measures to crack the last nut in the kitchen, accompanied by music from The Nutcracker. (3.) Wakko tries to come up with a new bizarre facial expression. (4.) The Warners sing about the 1994 Northridge earthquake.
71	2	"Variety Speak" (Y)	Al Zegler	Randy Rogel	September 16, 1995
71	2	"Three Tenors and You're Out" (S)	Audu Paden	Jeff Kwinty and Nicholas Hollander	September 16, 1995
71	2	"Bingo" (Y)	Liz Holzman and Al Zegler	Peter Hastings	September 16, 1995
(1.) Yakko and Dot explain to Wakko through song about how to read the headlines in Variety Magazine. (2.) Slappy's plans to take Skippy to a baseball game at Dodger Stadium go wrong when an opera performance by the famed Domino, Pepperoni, and Carumba is scheduled for that night instead. The singers (a parody of the Three Tenors) return at the end to perform a shortened version of the Animaniacs theme. (3.) Dr. Scratchansniff has only one player for his weekly bingo game – Wakko.
72	3	"Deduces Wild" (Y)	Liz Holzman	Sib Ventress	September 9, 1995
72	3	"Rest in Pieces" (S)	Audu Paden	Charles M. Howell IV	September 9, 1995
72	3	"U.N. Me" (Y)	Audu Paden	John P. McCann	September 9, 1995
(1.) The Warners bother Sherlock Holmes for help with their scavenger hunt. (2.) Slappy is asked to attend Walter's funeral, which is really a ruse planned by Walter to blow Slappy sky-high. (3.) The Warners sing about the United Nations to the tune of "Down by the Riverside".
73	4	"A Hard Day's Warners" (Y)	Audu Paden	Gordon Bressack and Charles M. Howell IV	September 23, 1995
73	4	"Gimme a Break" (S)	Liz Holzman	Sherri Stoner	September 23, 1995
73	4	"Please Please Please Get a Life Foundation" (Y)	Audu Paden	Peter Hastings	September 23, 1995
(1.) In a parody of A Hard Day's Night, the Warners run from their fans as they try to reach a cartoon convention. (2.) Slappy tries to get away from the filming of a blockbuster action film on her vacation day. (3.) The Warners tell people to "get a life" instead of going over every little reference in their show.
74	5	"The Tiger Prince" (Y)	Liz Holzman	Peter Hastings	September 30, 1995
74	5	"All the Words in the English Language" (Y)	Liz Holzman	Randy Rogel and Paul Rugg	September 30, 1995
74	5	"The Kid in the Lid" (Y)	Al Zegler	Paul Rugg and Tom Ruegger	September 30, 1995
74	5	"Method to Her Madness" (S)	Liz Holzman	Jeff Kwinty	September 30, 1995
(Cold opening.) A parody of the grand opening of The Lion King. (Wraparounds.) Throughout the episode, Yakko tries to sing all of the words in the English language dictionary to the tune of the "Mexican Hat Dance". (1.) The Warners visit Mary and Scooter and raise a ruckus in the style of The Cat in the Hat. (2.) In the 1950s, Slappy and Skippy attend a method acting class, which Slappy turns into a comedy class.
75	6	"Gimme the Works" (Y)	Audu Paden	Peter Hastings	October 21, 1995
75	6	"Buttons in Ows" (B)	Audu Paden and Barry Caldwell	Peter Hastings	October 21, 1995
75	6	"Hercules Unwound" (Y) (P)	Audu Paden	John Luden and Nick DuBois	October 21, 1995
(1.) Tired of their episode's latest plot of meeting a hot dog salesman, the Warners walk out of their cartoon. (2.) Buttons and Mindy parody The Wizard of Oz. However, they and Toto have a run-in with Pinky and Brain. (3.) The Warners once again do not feel up to doing another script where they have to help Hercules with his trials. Meanwhile, Pinky and Brain plan to steal Zeus' lightning bolts in ancient Greece as part of Brain's latest plan to take over the world.
76	7	"This Pun for Hire" (Y)	Audu Paden	Gordon Bressack, Charles M. Howell IV, Peter Hastings and Tom Ruegger	November 4, 1995
76	7	"Star Truck" (Y)	Audu Paden	Earl Kress	November 4, 1995
76	7	"Go Fish" (Y)	Liz Holzman	Paul Rugg	November 4, 1995
76	7	"Multiplication" (Y)	Al Zegler	Randy Rogel	November 4, 1995
(1.) In a parody of The Maltese Falcon and film noir, the Warners (as detectives) search and protect a mysterious statue from several suspicious characters (Minerva, Hello Nurse, Dr. Scratchansniff, and Ralph the Guard). (2.) The Warners are beamed onto Star Trek, where they cause chaos to the crew and introduce Squatty to donuts. (3.) Wakko gets in a fight with himself over a game of Go Fish. (4.) Yakko sings a song about multiplying 47 by 83. This is parody of Tom Lehrer's New Math
77	8	"The Presidents Song" (Y)	Al Zegler	Randy Rogel	November 11, 1995
77	8	"Don't Tread on Us" (P)	Al Zegler	Gordon Bressack and Charles M. Howell IV	November 11, 1995
77	8	"The Flame Returns" (F)	Barry Caldwell and Audu Paden	Nicholas Hollander (adaption)	November 11, 1995
(1.) To the William Tell Overture, the Warners sing about all of the U.S. presidents, from George Washington to Bill Clinton. (2.) Pinky and Brain plot to replace the Declaration of Independence with Brain's Declaration of Obedience, which will make him emperor of the world. (3.) The Flame is present as Henry Wadsworth Longfellow writes his famous poem "Paul Revere's Ride".
78	9	"The Sound of Warners" (Y)	Alfred Gimeno and Charles Visser	Paul Rugg	November 18, 1995
78	9	"Yabba Dabba Boo" (C)	Jon McClenahan and Rusty Mills	Peter Hastings	November 18, 1995
(1.) In a musical parody of The Sound of Music, Mr. Plotz hires Prunella Flundergust, a nanny who unknowingly gives the Warners a hard time with her constant singing and motherly personality. Since they cannot do anything to her unless she insults them, they try ruining her songs. When that does not work, they enlist someone who is not bound by the "Don't Provoke unless Provoked" code, namely Slappy Squirrel. (2.) Boo attends a table read for the film The Flintstones.
79	10	"My Mother the Squirrel" (S)	Charles Visser	Tom Ruegger	January 27, 1996
79	10	"The Party" (Y)	Charles Visser	Paul Rugg	January 27, 1996
79	10	"Oh! Say Can You See?" (F)	Charles Visser	Nicholas Hollander	January 27, 1996
79	10	"The 12 Days of Christmas Song" (O)	Charles Visser	Tom Ruegger (adaption)	January 27, 1996
(1.) The little bird is adopted by Slappy. (2.) The Warners invite several people to their water tower in expectation of a surprise guest, whom Plotz believes to be Steven Spielberg, but he is really a different Steven. (3.) The Flame watches along as Francis Scott Key writes The Star-Spangled Banner during the War of 1812. (4.) The little bird (accompanied by the Animaniacs orchestra) sings The Twelve Days of Christmas, with all of the gifts being turtledoves.
80	11	"Dot's Entertainment" (Y)	Charles Visser	Nicholas Hollander	February 3, 1996 (Note: Although these cartoons are considered part of season 3, they were all originally aired as full one-hour episodes (made by combining new shorts with old ones), with their original half-hour format not airing until season 4.)
80	11	"The Girl with the Googily Goop" (Y)	Charles Visser	Gordon Bressack and Charles M. Howell IV	February 3, 1996
80	11	"Gunga Dot" (Y)	Jon McClenahan and Rusty Mills	Randy Rogel	February 3, 1996
(1.) Dot is hired to take up an act in a famous musical. When the director, Andrew Lloyd Webber, becomes annoying, she and her brothers decide to ruin it. (2.) A showing of the Warners' appearance in a Googi Goop cartoon, "Little Red Riding Goop". (3.) In a parody of Rudyard Kipling's poem Gunga Din, Dot is the only one with water in a village and everyone wants it, because it is hot out.
81	12	"Soccer Coach Slappy" (S)	Jon McClenahan and Rusty Mills	Nick DuBois	February 3, 1996
81	12	"Belly Button Blues" (K)	Liz Holzman	Nicholas Hollander	February 3, 1996
81	12	"Our Final Space Cartoon, We Promise" (Y)	Charles Visser	Gordon Bressack and Charles M. Howell IV	February 3, 1996
81	12	"Valuable Lesson" (Y)	Charles Visser	Paul Rugg	February 3, 1996
(1.) Slappy is the coach of Skippy's soccer team. Skippy keeps getting hit in the face by the ball, causing him to cry and Slappy deciding to put him out of the game. But at the final game, the last ball that hits Skippy's face gives the team the win. (2.) Katie Ka-Boom gets furious when her parents will not let her wear clothes that are "in-style" at her school, since they make her belly button visible. (3.) The Warners wake up from suspended animation in a spaceship in a parody of 2001: A Space Odyssey. When AL5000, the computer of the ship, orders them to return to their sleeping pods, the Warners refuse to and things get out of hand. (4.) The Warners are visited by network censors after attacking Attila the Hun due to their cartoons being too violent.
82	13	"Wakko's 2-Note Song" (Y)	Rusty Mills	Peter Hastings	February 24, 1996
82	13	"Panama Canal" (Y)	Audu Paden	John McCann	February 24, 1996
82	13	"Hello Nurse" (Y)	Audu Paden	Randy Rogel	February 24, 1996
82	13	"The Ballad of Magellan" (Y)	Audu Paden and Barry Caldwell	John McCann and Paul Rugg	February 24, 1996
82	13	"The Return of the Great Wakkorotti" (Y)	Jon McClenahan	Written by : Tom Ruegger; Music adapted by : Russell Brower (uncredited)	February 24, 1996
82	13	"The Big Wrap Party Tonight" (Y)	Jon McClenahan	Tom Ruegger	February 24, 1996
(1.) Wakko and Dr. Scratchansniff argue over whether a song can be made from just two different notes. (2.) Yakko sings a song on the Latin American waterway to the tune of "Low Bridge". (3.) Yakko and Wakko sing about Hello Nurse. (4.) The Warners sing a song about Ferdinand Magellan to the tune of "Git Along, Little Dogies". (5.) Wakko, suffering from laryngitis and unable to belch, uses fart sounds from his hands to perform the "Chinese Dance" from Tchaikovsky's Nutcracker Suite. (6.) The Warners sing about their big third-season wrap party at the water tower. Note: Originally dubbed as the “New Years Party Tonight”.

=== Season 4 (1996) ===
No. overall	No. in season	Title	Directed by	Written by	Original release date
83	1	"One Flew Over the Cuckoo Clock" (S)	Jon McClenahan and Rusty Mills	Nicholas Hollander, Jeff Kwinty and Tom Ruegger	September 7, 1996
Skippy places Slappy in a retirement home for cartoon characters after she goes insane from watching too many tabloid talk shows. When Skippy misses a promised visit due to being placed in foster care, Slappy comes to her senses and decides to break out of the home and find him. A parody of One Flew Over the Cuckoo's Nest.
84	2	"Cutie and the Beast" (Y)	Audu Paden	Kevin Hopps	September 7, 1996
84	2	"Boo Happens" (C)	Audu Paden	Rafael Rosado and Audu Paden	September 7, 1996
84	2	"Noel" (Y)	Charles Visser	Randy Rogel	September 7, 1996
(1.) A parody of the Disney film Beauty and the Beast with Dot as the heroine, taken in by a beast played by the Tasmanian Devil. (2.) Boo re-enacts Forrest Gump. (3.) The Warners sing "The First Noel" in some very strange ways.
85	3	"Jokahontas" (Y)	Liz Holzman	Earl Kress	September 14, 1996
85	3	"Boids on the Hood" (G)	Liz Holzman	Lance Falk	September 14, 1996
85	3	"Mighty Wakko at the Bat" (Y)	Audu Paden	Randy Rogel	September 14, 1996
(1.) A parody of Disney's Pocahontas, with Dot as Pocahontas, and Mel Gibson (voiced by Jeff Bennett) as John Smith. (2.) After Plotz runs over the Goodfeathers with his car, they avenge themselves to the tune of Ride of the Valkyries. (3.) Yakko narrates a parody of the poem "Casey at the Bat," with the Animaniacs crew as the Mudville Nine and Wakko as Casey.
86	4	"A Very Very Very Very Special Show" (Y)	Liz Holzman	Randy Rogel	September 21, 1996
86	4	"Night of the Living Buttons" (B)	Al Zegler	Nick DuBois	September 21, 1996
86	4	"Soda Jerk" (Y)	Audu Paden	Rafael Rosada, Enrique May and Audu Paden	September 21, 1996
(1.) In a blatant attempt to win a humanitarian animation award, the Warners make an extremely politically correct cartoon. (2.) Mindy chases a frog through a graveyard, while Buttons tries to keep waking zombies at bay. (3.) After Wakko gets the hiccups from drinking a milkshake in a single gulp, Yakko and Dot attempt to cure him.
87	5	"From Burbank with Love" (Y)	Charles Visser	John P. McCann	September 28, 1996
87	5	"Anchors A-Warners" (Y)	Charles Visser	Nick DuBois	September 28, 1996
87	5	"When You're Traveling from Nantucket" (Y)	–	Randy Rogel (music and lyrics)	September 28, 1996
(1.) The Warners are partnered with Municipal Bond, Agent 0007 on a mission to stop the evil (and small-headed) Roy Blowfinger from stealing all the gold from Fort Knox to buy a bigger head. (2.) Dr. Scratchansniff goes on a cruise. Unfortunately for him, the Warners tag along with him. (3.) Yakko explains in song about the different time zones.
88	6	"Papers for Papa" (Y)	Audu Paden	Brett Baer and David Finkel	October 19, 1996
88	6	"Amazing Gladiators" (H)	Al Zegler	Story by : Richard Dasakas; Teleplay by : Herb Moore, Andrew Austin, John Over and Kevin Franks	October 19, 1996
88	6	"Pinky and the Ralph" (O)	–	–	October 19, 1996
(1.) The Warners chase Ernest Hemingway around the world when he refuses to sign for his office supply delivery, as he decides to quit writing when he gets writer's block. (2.) The Hip Hippos compete on a parody of American Gladiators. (3.) A sneak peek of a fictional spin-off starring Pinky and Ralph the Guard.
89	7	"Ten Short Films About Wakko Warner" (Y)	Audu Paden	Tom Minton and Paul Rugg	November 2, 1996
89	7	"No Time for Love" (O)	Audu Paden	Marlowe Weisman and Laraine Arkow	November 2, 1996
89	7	"The Boo Network" (C)	Charles Visser	John Dubiel	November 2, 1996
(1.) 10 short films with Wakko being his usual zany self. (2.) A cuckoo clock bird falls for a real bird and tries to win her love on the hour, though he keeps retracting into his clock. (3.) Boo disguises himself and creates a TV schedule that everybody likes the most, yet all the shows are chicken-themed.
90	8	"Pitter Patter of Little Feet" (H)	Audu Paden	Llyn Hunter, Enrique May and Audu Paden	November 16, 1996
90	8	"Mindy in Wonderland" (B)	Charles Visser	Nick DuBois	November 16, 1996
90	8	"Ralph's Wedding" (O)	Audu Paden and Jeff Siergey	Sherri Stoner	November 16, 1996
(1.) The Hip Hippos are delivered a new baby in the form of Brain. (2.) Buttons tries to protect Mindy in an Alice in Wonderland-like world while chasing a bunny. (3.) Ralph unexpectedly marries Boo.

=== Season 5 (1997–98) ===
No. overall	No. in season	Title	Directed by	Written by	Original release date
91	1	"Message in a Bottle" (Y)	Frank Molieri and Jon McClenahan	Randy Rogel and Gordon Bressack	September 8, 1997
91	1	"Back in Style" (Y)	Liz Holzman	Tom Minton	September 8, 1997
91	1	"Bones in the Body" (Y)	Liz Holzman	Randy Rogel	September 8, 1997
(1.) The Warners are lost at sea and find a message in a bottle floating on the surface. (2.) After Termite Terrace closes in 1962, Plotz loans the Warners out to other cartoon studios to help Warner Bros. stay profitable. (3.) The Warners sing about all the bones in the body, using Mr. Skullhead to demonstrate.
92	2	"It" (Y)	Jon McClenahan	Lenord Robinson and Lennie K. Graves	September 13, 1997
92	2	"Dot - The Macadamia Nut" (Y)	Jon McClenahan	Tom Ruegger (lyrics)	September 13, 1997
92	2	"Bully for Skippy" (S)	Jon McClenahan	Story by : Nick DuBois and Tom Ruegger; Teleplay by : Nick DuBois	September 13, 1997
(1.) Wakko is being chased by something terrifying behind the camera (Dot, who is playing tag with him). (2.) A parody of the "Macarena" music video with a song sung by and about Dot, a.k.a. "Macadamia". (3.) Skippy is forced to deal with the school bully, Duke, while Slappy faces an advocate against cartoon violence.
93	3	"Cute First (Ask Questions Later)" (Y)	Liz Holzman	Ralph Soll	October 11, 1997
93	3	"Acquaintances" (Y)	Audu Paden	Gordon Bressack and Charles M. Howell IV	October 11, 1997
93	3	"Here Comes Attila" (Y)	Audu Paden	John P. McCann	October 11, 1997
93	3	"Boo Wonder" (C)	Audu Paden and Charles Visser	Marcus Williams	October 11, 1997
(1.) Snow White's magic mirror tells her that she is no longer the cutest one of all, so she decides to settle the score with Dot, who has taken her place as the cutest. (2.) The Warners come to the United States as immigrants and invade the home of the Friends cast. (3.) The Warners sing a song about Attila the Hun. (4.) Boo assumes the role of Batman's sidekick Robin to stop the evil Punchline.
94	4	"Hooray for North Hollywood"	Stephen Lewis, Herb Moore, David Pryor and Kirk Tingblad	Randy Rogel and Tom Ruegger	January 3, 1998
95	5	"Hooray for North Hollywood"	Kirk Tingblad	Randy Rogel and Tom Ruegger	January 3, 1998
Part 1: The Warners write a film script only to have Plotz reject it, so they decide to crash a star-studded gala in hopes of making a deal with another studio. Part 2: Plotz loses his job after the Warners' film becomes a box office smash, but they realize that they miss having him yell at them and conspire to bring him back.
96	6	"The Carpool" (Y)	Stephen Lewis	Nick DuBois and Randy Rogel	February 21, 1998
96	6	"The Sunshine Squirrels" (S)	Russell Calabrese and Stephen Lewis	Kevin Hopps	February 21, 1998
(1.) The Warners join a carpool where they drive the rest of the passengers crazy. (2.) Slappy and her old partner Suzi reunite to perform an old sketch on a TV show.
97	7	"The Christmas Tree" (S)	Mike Milo	Nick DuBois, Kevin Hopps, Randy Rogel and Tom Ruegger	April 25, 1998
97	7	"Punchline (Part I)" (C)	–	–	April 25, 1998
97	7	"Prom Night" (K)	Charles Visser	Nicholas Hollander	April 25, 1998
97	7	"Punchline (Part II)" (C)	–	–	April 25, 1998
(1.) After Slappy's tree is cut down and taken to New York City for use as the Christmas tree in Rockefeller Center, she drives everyone crazy trying to get back to sleep. (2.) Boo and several other characters address the eternal question: "Why did the chicken cross the road?" (3.) Katie Ka-Boom has been invited to the prom, but gets angry while arguing with her parents over her curfew and what to buy. (4.) Another eternal question is addressed: "Which came first: the chicken or the egg?"
98	8	"Magic Time" (Y)	Audu Paden and Jon McClenahan	John P. McCann	May 9, 1998
98	8	"The Brain's Apprentice" (P)	Barry Caldwell, Greg Reyna and Ron Fleischer	Randy Rogel	May 9, 1998
(1.) The Warners cause chaos when famous magicians Schnitzel and Floyd (parodies of Siegfried & Roy) invite them to be volunteers in their act. (2.) In a parody of "The Sorcerer's Apprentice" from Fantasia, Brain builds robots and almost succeeds in taking over the world, but Pinky gets in the way as usual.
99	9	"Birds on a Wire" (G)	–	–	November 14, 1998
99	9	"The Scoring Session" (Y)	Mike Milo	Nick DuBois, Kevin Hopps, Randy Rogel and Tom Ruegger	November 14, 1998
99	9	"The Animaniacs Suite" (O)	–	Edited by : Al Breitenbach; Composed by : Richard Stone	November 14, 1998
(1.) The Goodfeathers look at, and comment on, a sunrise. (2.) The Warners take the place of Richard Stone (who is out for the day), and drive Neivel Nosenest insane. (3.) A clip show of "the first 99 episodes", set to an orchestral arrangement of the show theme and various character themes.

== Specials ==
=== Marathon special (1998) ===
Title	Original release date
"Animaniacs Attack Marathon"	July 4, 1998
These shorts include: "The Monkey Song"; "The Kid in the Lid"; "Method to Her Madness"; "I'm Mad"; "Taming of the Screwy"; "Moon Over Minerva"; "Wakko's America" / "Cutie and the Beast"; "Pitter Patter of Little Feet"; "Dot - The Macadamia Nut"; "Potty Emergency"; "King Yakko"; "Schnitzelbank"; "West Side Pigeons"; "The Great Wakkorotti: The Master & His Music"; "Super Strong Warner Siblings"; "The Great Wakkorotti: The Summer Concert"; "Clown and Out"; "The Return of the Great Wakkorotti"; "Astro-Buttons"; "Yakko's World"; "Video Review"; "Please Get a Life Foundation"; "Nighty-Night Toon" / Cold Ending #1

=== Film (1999) ===
Title	Directed by	Written by	Original release date
"Wakko's Wish"	Liz Holzman, Rusty Mills and Tom Ruegger	Story by : Tom Ruegger; Screenplay by : Tom Ruegger, Nick DuBois, Earl Kress, Kevin Hopps, Charles M. Howell IV and Randy Rogel	December 21, 1999
Taking place in winter, all the people (and a Mime) lived happily ever after; however, the Warner siblings are portrayed here as orphans and live in a poor town run by a overtaxing king. Wakko makes a wish to heal a sick Dot upon a star which crashlands over the mountains, and so the Warner siblings try to reach the star before everyone else in town does. Includes all the characters from the show and many memorable gags. Note: The direct-to-video film was done with digital ink and paint.

== Home media ==
=== VHS ===
Several VHS videos were released in the United States in the United Kingdom and Australia. The British and Australian VHS tapes were put in "volumes", which were generally jumbled at random and are in no particular order with the series. The U.S. videotapes, however, (with the exception of Animaniacs Stew) feature episodes that had focused on one general subject. Each video featured four to five skits each and was accompanied by a handful of skit intros, with a running time of about 45 to 55 minutes.

=== United Kingdom/Australia ===
Video name (Volumes)	Ep #	Release date	Episodes featured
Volume 1	4	March 27, 1995	Ups and Downs; Critical Condition; Wally Llama; Spell-Bound
Volume 2	5	March 27, 1995	Drive Insane; Cat on a Hot Steel Beam; With Three You Get Egg-Roll; Jockey for Position; Woodstock Slappy
Volume 3	7	October 23, 1995	Hooked on a Ceiling; The Big Kiss; Mesozoic Mindy; The Flame; Chicken Boo-Ryshnikov; Nothing But the Tooth; Pavlov's Mice
Volume 4	6	October 23, 1995	Cookies for Einstein; Hiccup; The World Can Wait; The Wild Blue Yonder; Hurray for Slappy; The Three Muska-Warners
Volume 5	5	June 3, 1996	Draculee, Draculaa; Phranken-Runt; Scare Happy Slappy; Brain Meets Brawn; Hot, Bothered and Bedeviled
Volume 6	3	June 3, 1996	Chairman of the Bored; Ta da Dump, Ta da Dump, Ta da Dump Dump Dump; Smell Ya Later; Lookit the Fuzzy Heads; Where Rodents Dare

=== United States ===
Video name (Collections)	Ep #	Release date	Episodes featured
An Animaniacs Sing-Along: Yakko's World	10	August 24, 1994	Yakko's World; Wakko's America; I'm Cute; H.M.S. Yakko; I'm Mad; Schnitzelbank; Make a Gookie; Our First Day of School
Animaniacs: The Warners Escape	4	August 24, 1994	Newsreel of the Stars; De-Zanitized; Temporary Insanity; Hello Nice Warners; Video Review
Animaniacs Stew	7	August 24, 1994	Slappy Goes Walnuts; Operation Lollipop; Sir Yaksalot; In the Garden of Mindy; Baghdad Café; Yes, Always; Bumbie's Mom
Animaniacs: Helloooo, Holidays!	8	August 24, 1994	Twas the Day Before Christmas; Little Drummer Warners; The Great Wakkorotti: The Holiday Concert; A Christmas Plotz; Jingle Boo; Yakko's Universe; A Gift of Gold; Nighty-Night Toons
Animaniacs: Spooky Stuff	6	August 13, 1996	Draculee, Draculaa; Phranken Runt; Meatballs or Consequences; Hot, Bothered, and Bedeviled; Scare Happy Slappy; Witch One
An Animaniacs Sing-Along: Mostly in Toon	12	August 13, 1996	The Ballad of Magellan; The Presidents Song; The Planets; The Panama Canal; Be Careful What You Eat; A Quake, a Quake!; The Big Wrap Party Tonight; The Senses; What Are We?; All the Words in the English Language; The Tiger Prince; Hello Nurse

=== DVD ===
Volume 1 of Animaniacs had sold very well; over half of the product being sold in the first week made it one of the fastest-selling animation DVD sets that Warner Home Video ever put out. All 99 episodes are available in four DVD boxed sets, although only Volume 1 has been released outside of Region 1. On October 2, 2018, a Complete Series DVD boxed set featuring all 99 episodes and Wakko's Wish, was released.

DVD name	Ep #	Release date	Additional information
Volume 1	25	July 25, 2006 (Region 1); December 3, 2018 (Region 2)	This five-disc boxed set contains the first 25 episodes of season 1. Includes the featurette "Animaniacs Live!", where Maurice LaMarche hosts an in-studio interview via satellite big screen TV with Animaniacs friends (voice actors, composers, etc.) as they comment on the show. The featurette is presented in its original television aspect ratio, with Dolby Digital 5.1 audio in English with French and Hungarian languages and French, Portuguese, Spanish, Romanian and Slovenian subtitles.
Volume 2	25	December 5, 2006	This five-disc boxed set contains the next 25 episodes (26–50) of season 1. Includes the featurette "The Writers Flipped, They Have No Script", where Maurice LaMarche leads a gathering of writers on what their favorite Animaniacs episodes are that they wrote.
Volume 3	25	June 19, 2007	This five-disc boxed set includes the last 15 episodes (51–65) of season 1, all four episodes (66–69) of season 2, and the first six episodes (70–75) of season 3. Includes two featurettes "They Can't Help It If They're Cute, They're Just Drawn That Way": Meet the Character Designers, Storyboard Artists and Art Directors who give life and lunacy to Wakko, Yakko, and Dot; and "They're Totally Insane-y: In Cadence with Richard Stone": The music of Animaniacs, highlighted by a tribute to the late composer.
Volume 4	24	February 5, 2013	This final three-disc boxed set contains the seven remaining episodes of season 3 (76–82) and all of the episodes of both season 4 (83–90) and season 5 (91–99). There are no special features included in this volume.
The Complete Series	99 + 1 film	October 2, 2018	This 19-disc box set includes all 99 episodes of the series from all five seasons, as well as the direct-to-video film Animaniacs: Wakko's Wish. The special features from the previous first three volumes are also included in this set.
