= Wakko's Wish =

1999 direct-to-video animated film

- VHS cover
- Directed by: Liz Holzman; Rusty Mills; Tom Ruegger
- Screenplay by: Tom Ruegger; Nick DuBois; Earl Kress; Kevin Hopps; Charles M. Howell IV; Randy Rogel
- Story by: Tom Ruegger
- Based on: Animaniacs by Tom Ruegger
- Produced by: Liz Holzman; Rusty Mills; Tom Ruegger
- Starring: Jess Harnell; Tress MacNeille; Rob Paulsen; Paxton Whitehead; Maurice LaMarche; Sherri Stoner; Nathan Ruegger; Nancy Cartwright; Frank Welker; John Mariano; Chick Vennera; Bernadette Peters; Ben Stein
- Narrated by: Tom Bodett
- Edited by: John Carnochan; Tim Hill
- Music by: Richard Stone; Steven Bernstein; Julie Bernstein; Gordon Goodwin; Tim Kelly
- Production companies: Warner Bros. Animation; Amblin Entertainment
- Distributed by: Warner Home Video
- Release date: December 21, 1999
- Running time: 80 minutes
- Country: United States
- Language: English

Wakko's Wish (also known as Animaniacs: Wakko's Wish and originally titled as Wakko's Wakko Wish) is a 1999 American animated musical comedy-adventure fantasy direct-to-video film based on the 1993–1998 animated series Animaniacs, and serves as the series finale related to the show before the 2020 revival of the series. It relocates all of the Animaniacs characters to a quasi-19th century fairy tale world and portrays their race to find the wishing star that will grant them a wish.

The film was first released on VHS by Warner Home Video on December 21, 1999. It contains 10 original songs and features a majority of the voice cast reprising their respective roles from the TV show.

== Plot ==
In the town of Acme Falls within the kingdom of Warnerstock, all the people (including the mime) live happily together. However, upon the death of their beloved king, William the Good, Warnerstock enters a state of civil war. Taking advantage of the situation, the neighboring kingdom of Ticktockia, led by King Salazar the Pushy, takes over Warnerstock, and makes all its people poor and miserable due to overtaxing. Three siblings, Yakko, Wakko, and Dot Warner, are particularly broke, as Dot needs an operation. Wakko finds work in another town to pay for it, but Taxman Plotz takes his pay—a ha'penny—from him for "taxes".

Wakko, saddened about Dot's illness and finding no other choice, wishes upon a star. A fairy falls from the star and explains that Wakko had just chosen the only wishing star in the sky. The star itself falls shortly after in the mountains and the fairy tells Wakko that whoever touches the star gets one wish. The following morning, the siblings tell the whole town about the star in their excitement, and all rush towards the glow in the mountains. King Salazar finds out about the star, orders Plotz and Ralph to stop the Warners from reaching the star alive, and orders his troops, led by the Captain of the Guard, to secure it.

Plotz does not stop the Warners from reaching the star at the same time as all the other townsfolk. However, the King's army has already built a military base around the star, and an ice palace to the side of it, and the townspeople are all captured and locked up so that the King may have his wish. The Warners hint that the wishing process is not as simple as the king thinks in a desperate bluff. The King captures the Warners and tortures them in outlandish ways. After being traumatized, the Warners tell the King that any wish, which he makes, may have an ironic twist and demonstrate this to his annoyance. He orders the Warners executed, but Dot uses her "cuteness" to save them.

As the King is about to make his wish (for the Warners to leave him alone), the Warners make a run for the star, and he orders his guards to shoot a cannon at them. The cannonball explodes after landing just short of hitting the Warners, but Dot is mortally wounded and asks Yakko to tell her the story of how she was born one last time. Dot appears to die, causing the people of Acme Falls to cry in sorrow, along with some of the royal army. The Captain of the Guard becomes furious with King Salazar and gives him an angry speech calling him out for his cruel nature. As everyone turns on the King, who seemingly appears a little remorseful, Dot reveals that she had been acting and was not actually dead; the two were buying time for Wakko, who seizes his chance to head to the star, reaching it in time. He wishes for two ha'pennies, to the delight of everyone. The Warners then lead the townspeople back to town to help them fulfill their wishes.

Wakko uses the second of these to buy food and "season tickets for the Lakers". The first one pays for Dot's operation, which is merely revealed to be a plastic surgery to give her a beauty mark. Wakko's first ha'penny, however, returns prosperity to the town as the butcher, the baker, and the grocer spend the money that they earned, and the people from whom they make purchases in turn do the same. The hospital finds Yakko, Wakko, and Dot's birth certificates, and reveals they are the heirs to William the Good. They boot Salazar out of their palace, and he is attacked by his own dogs. The Warners use their newfound royal authorities to grant the citizens of Acme Falls their wishes—except for the mime (which was Yakko's wish).

Taking his siblings by the hand, Yakko, Wakko, and Dot spin the Wheel of Morality one last time, which specifies the moral of the story is "Just cheer up and never ever give up hope".

== Voice cast ==
- Jess Harnell as Wakko Warner
- Tress MacNeille as:
  - Dot Warner
  - Marita Hippo
  - Hello Nurse
  - Mindy's mother
- Rob Paulsen as:
  - Yakko Warner
  - Pinky
  - Dr. Otto Scratchansniff
- Sherri Stoner as Slappy Squirrel
- Nathan Ruegger as Skippy Squirrel
- Maurice LaMarche as:
  - The Brain
  - Squit
  - Wakko's burps
- Frank Welker as:
  - Ralph the Guard
  - Thaddeus Plotz as Baron Von Blotz
  - Runt
  - Buttons
  - Chicken Boo
  - Flavio Hippo
- Nancy Cartwright as Mindy
- Chick Vennera as Pesto
- John Mariano as Bobby
- Bernadette Peters as Rita
- Paxton Whitehead as King Salazar the Pushy
- Ben Stein as Desire Fulfillment Facilitator (a.k.a. "Pip")
- Jeff Bennett as:
  - Baloney
  - The Captain of the Guards
- Paul Rugg as Mr. Director
- Julie Brown as Minerva Mink
- Tom Bodett as The Narrator
- Steven Bernstein as himself

== Production and release ==
Although Wakko's Wish had been rated highly amongst children and adults in test screenings, Warner Bros. decided to release it direct-to-video rather than spending money on marketing a wide theatrical release. Wakko's Wish was originally slated for its VHS release in November 1998, but was pushed forward to December 21, 1999, and re-released on January 25, 2000, as part of the Warner Bros. Century 2000 Collection. It is the first Animaniacs production to use digital ink and paint, and the first direct-to-video film by Warner Bros. Animation to do so. On August 25, 2008, Wakko's Wish was released for rental or purchase on iTunes. Wakko's Wish has also aired on cable networks such as Cartoon Network, Cinemax, Boomerang and more recently on The Hub (now Discovery Family). It is also available to download from the PlayStation Store. The film was finally released on DVD on October 7, 2014, nearly 15 years after its initial release and just after the deaths of Liz Holzman and Rusty Mills (two of the film's main directors) on August 11, 2014, and December 7, 2012, respectively. It was also Chick Vennera's final performance as Pesto before his retirement from acting in 2011 and death in 2021.

== Songs ==
Wakko's Wish features 11 original songs, composed by Julie Bernstein and Randy Rogel, with lyrics written by Tom Ruegger and Rogel. The score is composed by Animaniacs composers Richard Stone, Steve and Julie Bernstein, Gordon Goodwin, and Tim Kelly. The compositions Stone wrote for the film were some of the last he wrote for Warner Bros. Animation prior to his death on March 9, 2001. The cast of the film also doubles as a chorus for many of the musical numbers.

No.	Title	Lyrics	Music	Performer(s)	Length
1.	"Never Give Up Hope"	Tom Ruegger, Kevin Hopps & Nick Dubois	Julie Bernstein	Jess Harnell, Rob Paulsen, Tress MacNeille & Cast
2.	"Train Bringing Wakko"	Tom Ruegger	Julie Bernstein	Rob Paulsen, Tress MacNeille & Cast
3.	"I've Got a Ha'Penny"	Tom Ruegger	Julie Bernstein	Jess Harnell, Rob Paulsen, Tress MacNeille & Cast
4.	"So Much for Wakko's Ha'Penny"	Tom Ruegger	Julie Bernstein	Bernadette Peters, Sherri Stoner, Nathan Ruegger, Rob Paulsen & Cast
5.	"Twinkle, Twinkle"	Tom Ruegger	Traditional; arranged by Julie Bernstein	Jess Harnell
6.	"Never Give Up Hope (Reprise)"	Tom Ruegger	Julie Bernstein	Jess Harnell & Ben Stein
7.	"The Wishing Star"	Randy Rogel	Randy Rogel	Jess Harnell, Rob Paulsen & Tress MacNeille
8.	"Hungarian Rhapsody"	Randy Rogel & Tom Ruegger	Franz Liszt	Jess Harnell, Rob Paulsen, Tress MacNeille & Cast
9.	"The Wishing Star (Reprise)"	Randy Rogel	Randy Rogel	Paxton Whitehead, Frank Welker, Jess Harnell, Rob Paulsen & Tress MacNeille
10.	"If I Could Have My Wish Then I'd Be Happy"	Randy Rogel	Randy Rogel	Jess Harnell, Rob Paulsen, Tress MacNeille & Cast
11.	"Never Give Up Hope (Finale)"	Tom Ruegger	Julie Bernstein	Jess Harnell, Rob Paulsen, Tress MacNeille & Cast

== Reception ==
Test screenings of Wakko's Wish on children and parents revealed very positive reactions to the film. In February 1999, ToonZone reported that "97% of kids and parents gave it a review of 'highly positive'", and that "98% of children screened gave the film a rating of good, very good, or excellent".

=== Critical reception ===
Wakko's Wish received generally positive reviews. Many critics praised the animation, character appearances, and music. Many comments of the film focused on the introduction of a serious tone to a series known for its off-the wall humor. Brett Rogers of AOL Hometown gave the film a positive review, saying that "[t]here’s a lot about this movie that will please die-hard Animaniacs fans," noting the appearances of almost all of the main characters and antagonists of the original series. Rogers pointed that the pathos not usually seen in the series may leave some Animaniacs fans distant from the film, but that the serious tone is "backed up with superb voice acting," by Paulsen and Harnell. Other reviews were not so positive. MaryAnn Johanson of FlickFilosopher wrote that "[i]mposing the kind of story and characters necessary to fill a 90-minute movie upon the Animaniacs constrains their lunacy," and that doing so left the characters boring, so much that "older kids and adult fans of the Warners et al may be sorely disappointed." Michael Stewart of Entertainment Weekly found that the lack of the typical Animaniacs humor was positive, saying that the film "avoids the forced wackiness that plagues the television series," while "deliver[ing] some laughs for both kids and adults." However, he noted a similar criticism to Johanson, saying that placing the entire Animaniacs cast into the film felt uncomfortable, and that the "[w]arm sentiments" of the film aren't the "specialty" of Animaniacs. He rated the film a "C+" overall. Michael Dequina of TheMovieReport.com gave one of the most positive reviews of the film. Praising the film's "smart, satiric in-jokes for the adults and broader slapstick for the young ones," Dequina said that the film was "one glorious example" of a family film that would appeal to the whole family, and rated the film with three and a half out of four stars.

=== Accolades ===
In 2000, Wakko's Wish was nominated for four Annie Awards: One for "Outstanding Achievement in An Animated Home Video Production", one for "Outstanding Individual Achievement for Music in an Animated Feature Production" (Richard Stone, Steven Bernstein, Julie Bernstein, Gordon Goodwin & Timothy Kelly), one for "Outstanding Individual Achievement for Voice Acting By a Female Performer in an Animated Feature Production" (Tress MacNeille), and one for "Outstanding Individual Achievement for Voice Acting By a Male Performer in an Animated Feature Production" (Maurice LaMarche). Since its release, Wakko's Wish has been rated as one of the "Top 60 Animated Features Never Theatrically Released in the United States" by the Animated Movie Guide.
