= Animaniacs =

American animated television series

- Series logo featuring (from left to right) Yakko Warner, Dot Warner, and Wakko Warner
- Also known as: Steven Spielberg Presents Animaniacs
- Genre: Sketch comedy; Surreal comedy; Musical; Slapstick; Satire
- Created by: Tom Ruegger
- Voices of: Various: Rob Paulsen; Jess Harnell; Tress MacNeille; John Mariano; Chick Vennera; Maurice LaMarche; Frank Welker; Bernadette Peters; Nancy Cartwright; Julie Brown; Laura Mooney; Sherri Stoner; Nathan Ruegger; Paul Rugg; Luke Ruegger; Cody Ruegger; Jim Cummings; Tom Bodett; Jeff Bennett
- Theme music composer: Richard Stone
- Opening theme: "Animaniacs Theme" performed by Rob Paulsen, Tress MacNeille, Jess Harnell, and the cast of Animaniacs
- Composers: Various: Richard Stone; Steven Bernstein; Julie Bernstein; Gordon Goodwin; Carl Johnson; J. Eric Schmidt
- Country of origin: United States
- Original language: English
- No. of seasons: 5
- No. of episodes: 99 (274 segments) (list of episodes)

Production
- Executive producer: Steven Spielberg
- Producers: Rich Arons; Sherri Stoner; Rusty Mills; Peter Hastings
- Running time: 20–21 minutes (1–10 minutes per segment)
- Production companies: Amblin Entertainment; Warner Bros. Television Animation (Note: Credited as Warner Bros. Animation from 1993 to 1995.); Warner Bros. Domestic Television Distribution (1993–1994) (seasons 1–2)

Original release
- Network: Fox Kids
- Release: September 13, 1993 – November 12, 1994
- Network: Kids' WB
- Release: September 9, 1995 – November 14, 1998

Related
- Animaniacs (2020–23); Tiny Toon Adventures; The Plucky Duck Show; Freakazoid!; Pinky and the Brain; Pinky, Elmyra & the Brain

Animaniacs (/ˌæn.ɪˈmeɪ.ni.æks/ an-ih-MAY-nee-aks) is an American animated comedy television series created by animator Tom Ruegger and produced by Amblin Entertainment and Warner Bros. Television Animation. It originally aired on Fox's Fox Kids block from September 13, 1993 to November 12, 1994 and moved to The WB on September 9, 1995 as part of its Kids' WB afternoon programming block until the series ended on November 14, 1998. A direct-to-video film, Wakko's Wish, was released in 1999. 99 episodes (274 segments) were produced over five seasons.

Animaniacs is styled as a variety show, with short skits featuring a large cast of characters focusing on the Warner Brothers and their sister as main characters. The Warner siblings were in part inspired by the real-life Warner Bros. Water Tower on the Warner Bros. Studios lot in Burbank, California. While the show had no set format, most episodes were composed of three short mini-episodes, each starring a different set of characters and bridging segments. Elements of the series included frequent musical numbers, satire, character catchphrases, and references to historical events and figures.

The series received acclaim from critics and won multiple awards, including eight Daytime Emmy awards and a Peabody award. Animaniacs continued to rerun in syndication through the 1990s into the early 2000s after production of new episodes ceased. A revival of the series streamed on Hulu between 2020 and 2023. Additionally, nine video games based on the series were produced.

== Premise ==
Animaniacs had a wide cast of characters; shown here are most of the characters from the series.

In the 1930s, the Warner siblings, Yakko, Wakko, and Dot, were three cartoon stars who were locked away in the real-life Warner Bros. Water Tower because they were seen as too zany. Several decades later, the trio escapes from the tower, interacting with Warner Bros. studio workers, including Ralph the Security Guard, archrival Dr. Otto Scratchansniff, and Hello Nurse.

Pinky and the Brain are two genetically altered anthropomorphic laboratory mice who continuously plot and attempt to take over the world. The segments would begin with Brain asking, "Are you pondering what I'm pondering?" before Pinky would respond with a non sequitur. Slappy Squirrel is an octogenarian squirrel cartoon star paired with her nephew, Skippy.

The Goodfeathers trio, Bobby, Pesto, and Squit, are pigeons from New York based on the characters Henry Hill, Jimmy Conway, and Tommy DeVito from Goodfellas (1990). Buttons is a pooch who risks his life to protect his four-year-old owner, Mindy. Rita and Runt are a homeless cat-and-dog duo, being dropped after the first season. Katie Ka-Boom is a teenager with a temper. Chicken Boo is a giant chicken who wishes to live among humans. Additional side characters include the Hip Hippos.

== Episodes ==
Season	Segments	Episodes	Originally released		
Season	Segments	Episodes	First released	Last released	Network
1	171	65	September 13, 1993	May 23, 1994	Fox (Fox Kids)
2	12	4	September 10, 1994	November 12, 1994	Fox (Fox Kids)
3	46	13	September 9, 1995	February 24, 1996	The WB (Kids' WB)
4	22	8	September 7, 1996	November 16, 1996	The WB (Kids' WB)
5	23	9	September 8, 1997	November 14, 1998	The WB (Kids' WB)
Wakko's Wish			December 21, 1999		Direct-to-video

== Production ==
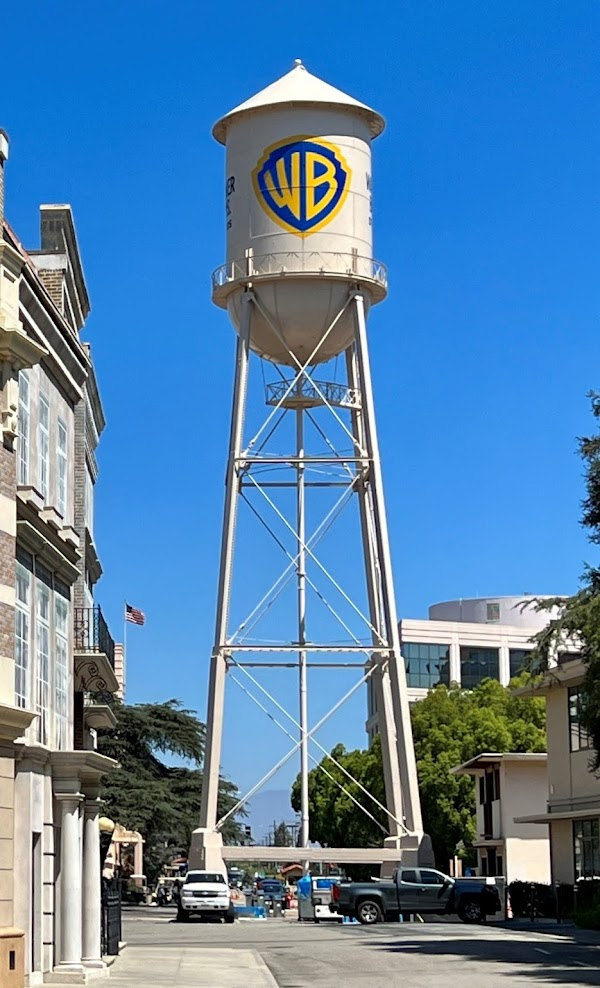
The Warner Bros. Water Tower in 2022

=== Development ===
Following the success of Tiny Toon Adventures, Steven Spielberg offered series creator Tom Ruegger a chance to develop another television series. While walking around the studio lot and seeing the Warner Bros. Water Tower, Ruegger took inspiration from the Marx Brothers to create Yakko, Wakko, and Dot and wanted to incorporate them into a "contemporary Little Rascals' situation". The personalities of the siblings were based on Ruegger's three sons.

Slappy Squirrel was based on a suggestion by Sherri Stoner, one of the producers and writers for Tiny Toon Adventures, that she acted like a teenager during her adulthood. Other characters were based on staff members' children or experiences, cartoons, and films. The Goodfeathers trio, Bobby, Pesto, and Squit, were based on Joe Pesci's Tommy DeVito, Robert De Niro's Jimmy Conway, and Ray Liotta's Henry Hill from Goodfellas (1990).

Spielberg approved and rejected 25 sets of characters and their concepts pitched by Ruegger and his team in his home with the assistance of his children. Four or five sets of characters were approved; several of them were rejected, including Nipsy and Russell, Bossy Beaver and Doyle, and the amoeba stars of "As the Petri Dish Turns". Nearly rejected, one of Spielberg's children approved Buttons and Mindy.

With the cost of $400,000 per episode, the series was produced with a budget of nearly $26 million for the first season, which was nearly $1 million more than the budget of the first season of Tiny Toon Adventures. (Note: Attributed to multiple sources:) Following the end of the series, Wakko's Wish was developed.

=== Writing ===
Animaniacs was written for an audience of all ages, emphasizing aspects for comedic purposes. Some ideas were based on the writers' lives. Cultural references were added to target a slightly older audience. Several jokes were improvised in recording sessions. A few segments were affected by censorship. For three months, the production wrangled with the censors to air the scene where a parodied caricature of Elizabeth II sits on a whoopee cushion in the segment "Windsor Hassle". Not finding the script funny, censors rejected the segment featuring Yakko, Wakko, and Dot tormenting a group of censors.

Animaniacs was developed following the passage of the Children's Television Act in 1990, which required programming aimed at children to include educational content. The writers worked this into the show by featuring segments involving the characters interacting with historical figures and creating songs like "Yakko's World" to serve as educational content.

=== Voice actors ===
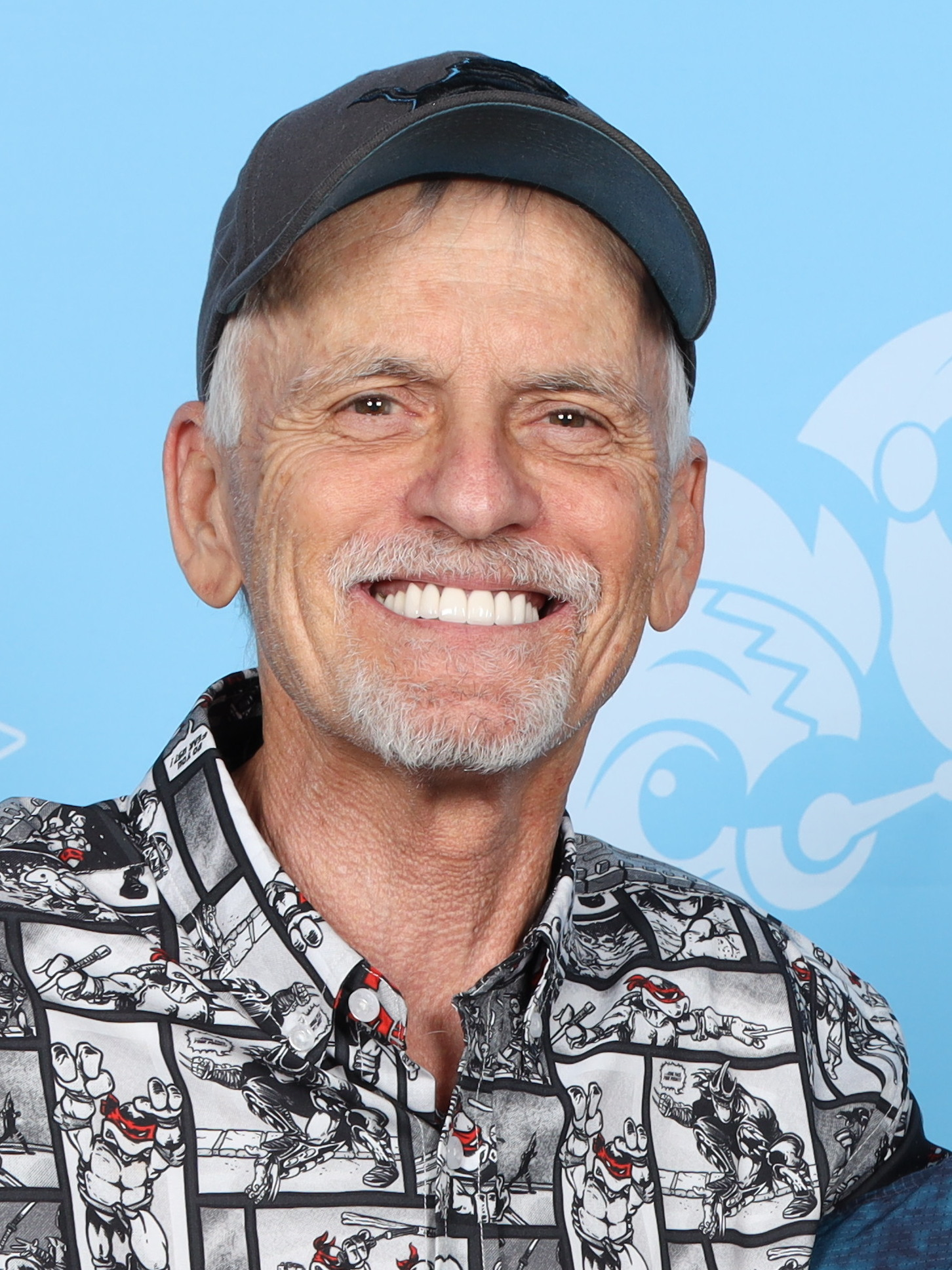
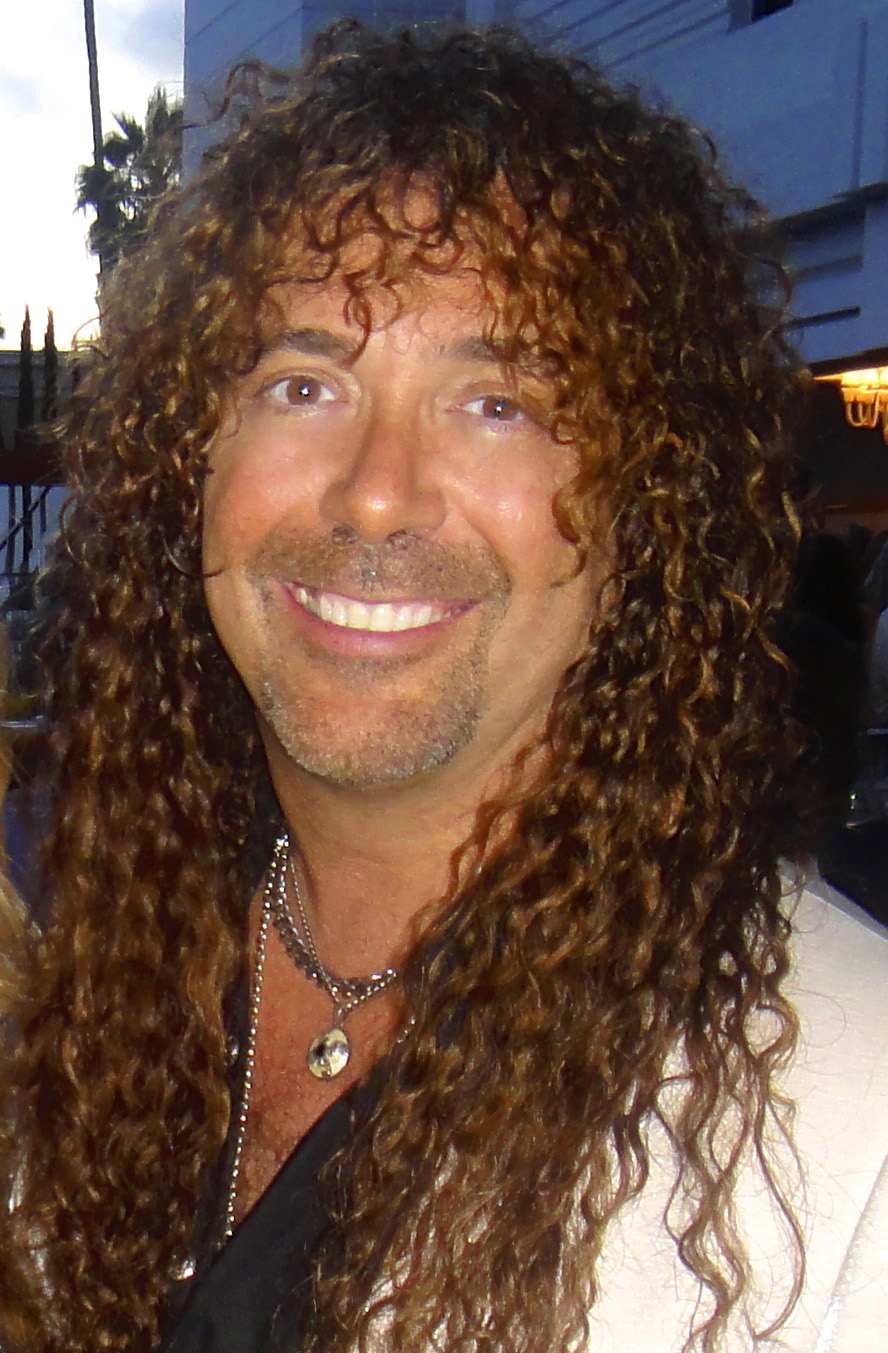
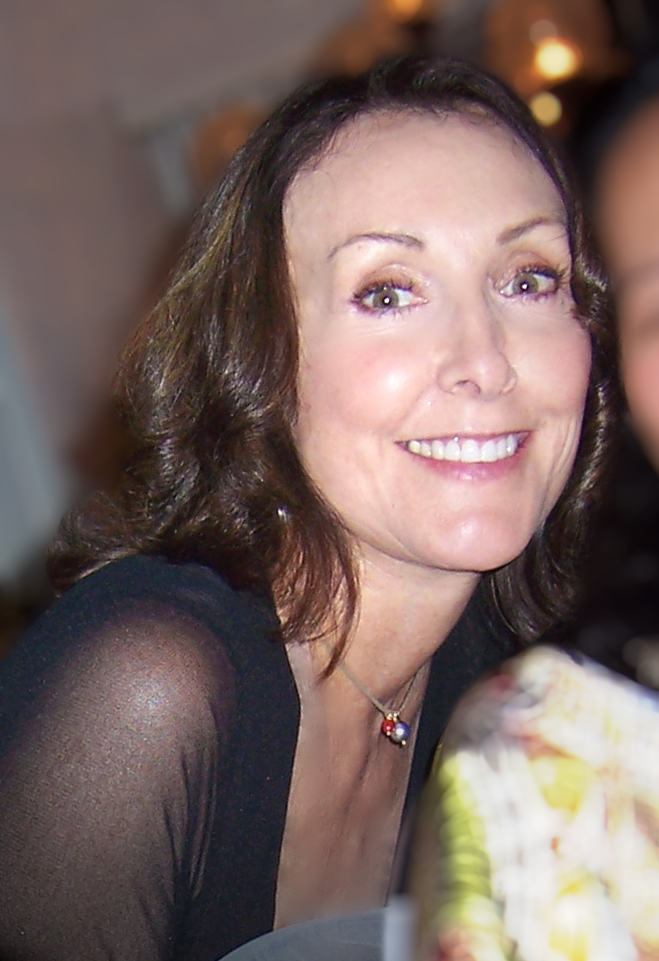
Rob Paulsen in 2024 (left), Jess Harnell in 2014 (middle), and Tress MacNeille in 2007 (right)

Animaniacs features the voices of Rob Paulsen as Yakko and Pinky, Jess Harnell as Wakko, Tress MacNeille as Dot, and Maurice LaMarche as the Brain. For voice actors to audition for the series, voice director Andrea Romano, Ruegger, and a few others called them to sit at a table in the SoundCastle studio and develop ideas for the voices of the characters. Paulsen auditioned for Yakko by sounding like comedian Groucho Marx and Pinky by giving him a Cockney accent inspired by English comedians, such as the Monty Python comedy troupe and various comedians in The Goon Show, getting callbacks during an eight-week process. Paulsen also voiced Dr. Otto Scratchansniff. Ranking as the "best stuff he has ever done", Paulsen recorded his lines for four hours per episode.

Having previously worked with Ruegger and Spielberg on Tiny Toon Adventures, MacNeille was invited to audition for Dot since her voice was similar to Babs Bunny. During the last week of auditions, Harnell was invited to audition for the series, imitating impressions while Ruegger shouted each celebrity through an almanac. As Harnell showed his impressions of each band member of The Beatles, Harnell auditioned for Wakko by doing a younger impression of Ringo Starr at Romano's suggestion.

While auditioning for various characters, LaMarche thought the Brain resembled Orson Welles, doing an impression of "two-thirds Welles [and] one-third Vincent Price". LaMarche became Romano's only choice for the character. LaMarche approached voicing the Brain seriously, investing it with depth and a sense of morality. He did a direct impression of Welles for the episode "Yes, Always". Ruegger's oldest son, Nathan, voiced Slappy Squirrel's nephew, Skippy. Rita's voice was provided by Bernadette Peters.

=== Designs and animation ===
Inspired by cartoon stars from the early 1930s, Ruegger and other artists drew the Warner siblings similar to the animated characters from the time period, serving as inspirations, including Felix the Cat, Bosko, and Foxy. Yakko's design was largely inspired by Groucho Marx; Wakko's design resembled Groucho's older brother, Harpo Marx. Brain's design resembled writer Tom Minton.

The animation was completed at Tokyo Movie Shinsha and Seoul Movie in Japan, StarToons in Chicago (with ink and paint services provided by an animation studio in Seoul), Wang Film Productions in Taiwan, Freelance Animators New Zealand in New Zealand, and AKOM in South Korea. The show used 10,000 more drawings than other animated television series.

=== Music ===
Spielberg originated the idea to compose an original score for every episode. The series's main composer is Richard Stone. Having previously worked on Tiny Toon Adventures, Stone approached his scoring by incorporating techniques similar to Carl W. Stalling's work and scoring several parodies of Broadway musicals. He also composed the theme song. Other composers were contracted to write original underscores, including Steve and Julie Bernstein.

Using a 29- to 32-player orchestra, the orchestra used a French horn for opera parodies, a harp for Christmas specials, and a specific instrument for individual segments. In some sessions, the music score for individual segments or a full episode is finished for a maximum of 22 minutes per day. Other sessions combine the cues of the series with cues from Pinky and the Brain and Freakazoid!. Between 45 and 50 ending gags were individually scored for two hours in one day; each one lasted one to thirteen seconds.

At Spielberg's suggestion, each segment has a specific style of music. The music score of the Warner siblings' segments was inspired by early Warner Bros. cartoons and Tiny Toon Adventures. The music score of "The Goodfeathers" segments was composed in the style of Martin Scorsese's films and The Godfather. Stone played the mandolin in the first segments of "The Goodfeathers". Ruegger incorporated Antonín Dvořák's Humoresques for the theme song of the segments featuring Slappy Squirrel. For several months, Ruegger battled with censors to air the song "Lake Titicaca".

== Broadcast history ==
Animaniacs premiered on September 13, 1993, on the programming block Fox Kids, continuing to air episodes until September 8, 1995. During its run, Animaniacs became the second-most popular children's show among both ages 2–11 and ages 6–11 (behind Mighty Morphin Power Rangers). Animaniacs became one of the top five highest-rated weekday afternoon programs. As of 1995, approximately 500,000 viewers watched the series in Canada. On March 30, 1994, the theatrical short I'm Mad was released alongside Thumbelina in the U.S. The short was intended to be the first theatrical short of the series, bringing Animaniacs to a wider audience. Due to the box office failure of the film, I'm Mad was the only Animaniacs theatrical short produced.

In 1995, Warner Bros. Animation was looking to invest in additional episodes of Animaniacs past the traditional 65-episode marker for syndication. Animaniacs moved to The WB's programming block Kids' WB, premiering on September 9, 1995. That year, the popularity of Pinky and the Brain led to the first spin-off series, which was dropped from Animaniacs. It premiered on September 10, 1995, on The WB's programming block Kids' WB. The second spin-off series, Pinky, Elmyra & the Brain, premiered on September 19, 1998, on the Kids' WB programming block. The series finale aired on November 14, 1998. The series was followed by the feature-length direct-to-video movie Wakko's Wish; it was released on VHS on December 21, 1999. In 2000, Nickelodeon bought the rights to air the series for $20 million, debuting on the network in mid-2001. The streaming service Netflix picked up the series in 2016. Hulu picked up the series in 2018 as part of a deal when they acquired the revival series. The original series was removed from Hulu in 2023. On March 1, 2026, the series was added to the Tubi streaming service.

== Reception ==
=== Critical response ===
During the original run, Animaniacs received acclaim from critics. Upon its debut, Jennifer Mangan of the Chicago Tribune and Diane Werts of Newsday picked the series as a highlight of the 1993–94 television season. Several critics lauded the humor, finding the series funny. Greg Kennedy of the Edmonton Journal ranked the Warner siblings as "the funniest cartoon animals since the original Looney Tunes" and stated that the series was "destined to become an animation classic". The Toronto Star's Norman Wilher compared the series to Tiny Toon Adventures, stating that Animaniacs is "less structured and a lot funnier". Critics, such as Evan Levine of United Features Syndicate, Joal Ryan of Pasadena Star-News, and Wertz, highlighted its allusions, connections, and parodies. A few critics also highlighted its appeal to kids and adults. In a less complimentary review, Barry Garron of The Kansas City Star said that "the silliness is [mostly] uninspired[,] and the humor [is] lacking".

Most critics, such as N. F. Mendoza of The Los Angeles Times, The Salt Lake Tribune's Randy Peterson, and animation historian Charles Solomon of The Los Angeles Times, praised the high-quality animation and visuals. Levine and Ryan deemed the animation and visuals superior to other animated television series. Curtis Ross of The Tampa Tribune noted that "the characters move with a fluidity too long absent from [Tiny Toons]." In a divided review, Maryland-based writer Paula O'Keefe noted the inconsistency of animation, reviewing that Tokyo Movie Shinsha's animation was "excellent", AKOM and Wang Film Productions' animation was "competent", and Freelance Animators New Zealand and StarToons' animation was "sadly awkward and unappealing". Some critics highlighted the music, commending it as clever, silly, and witty. (Note: Attributed to multiple references:)

While Levine reviewed that the "characters and plots are generally amusing", Solomon said that the characters "never emerged [coherently]". A few critics dismissed individual segments used in the series. O'Keefe criticized individual segments featuring Buttons and Mindy, Rita and Runt, the Goodfeathers, and the Hip Hippos. Nora McArt of the Brainerd Dispatch dismissed some of the segments, reviewing that they "try too hard to be sophomorically outrageous, simply end[ing] up being stupid and dull".

For the theatrical short "I'm Mad", a few critics, such as Steve Persall of St. Petersburg Times and Sean P. Means of The Salt Lake Tribune, deemed the short superior to the film. Writing for the New York Daily News, film critic Jami Bernard lauded the animation, deeming it similar to the original Looney Tunes cartoons. Paul Malcolm of LA Weekly called the short "a major disappointment".

In 2009, IGN ranked Animaniacs as the 17th-greatest animated series of all time in their own top 100 animated series of all time list. Writing a retrospective review in Entertainment Weekly in 2011, John Young praised the humor and musical numbers, including references that he was unable to understand at the time. In 2021, the Chicago Tribune named it the 66th-best television series of the 1990s. In 2023, Vanity Fair praised the show.

=== Awards and nominations ===
Award	Date of ceremony	Category	Recipient(s)	Result	Ref.
Annie Awards	November 12, 1994	Best Animated Television Program	Animaniacs	Nominated	
Annie Awards	November 12, 1994	Best Achievement in Voice Acting	Frank Welker as the voice of various characters	Nominated	
Annie Awards	November 11, 1995	Best Animated Television Program	Animaniacs	Nominated	
Annie Awards	November 11, 1995	Best Achievement in Voice Acting	Rob Paulsen as the voice of Yakko Warner	Nominated	
Annie Awards	November 11, 1995	Best Achievement in Voice Acting	Tress MacNeille as the voice of Dot Warner	Nominated	
Annie Awards	November 11, 1995	Best Achievement in Music	Richard Stone	Nominated	
Annie Awards	November 10, 1996	Best Animated Television Program	Animaniacs	Nominated	
Annie Awards	November 10, 1996	Best Achievement in Music	Richard Stone, Steve Bernstein, and Julie Bernstein	Nominated	
Annie Awards	November 16, 1997	Best Individual Achievement for Directing in a TV Production	Charles Visser for the episode "Noel"	Nominated	
Annie Awards	November 13, 1998	Outstanding Animated Daytime Television Program	Animaniacs	Nominated	
Daytime Emmy Awards	May 25, 1994 (main ceremony)	Outstanding Children's Animated Program	Steven Spielberg, Sherri Stoner, Rich Arons, Tom Ruegger, Michael Gerard, Alfred Gimeno, Bob Kline, Jenny Lerew, Rusty Mills, Audu Paden, Greg Reyna, Lenord Robinson, and Barry Caldwell	Nominated	
Daytime Emmy Awards	May 25, 1994 (main ceremony)	Outstanding Music Direction and Composition	Richard Stone and Steven Bernstein	Won	
Daytime Emmy Awards	May 25, 1994 (main ceremony)	Outstanding Original Song	Richard Stone and Tom Ruegger for the song "Animaniacs Main Title Theme"	Won	
Daytime Emmy Awards	May 25, 1994 (main ceremony)	Outstanding Writing in an Animated Program	John P. McCann, Nicholas Hollander, Tom Minton, Paul Rugg, Deanna Oliver, Tom Ruegger, Sherri Stoner, Randy Rogel, and Peter Hastings	Nominated	
Daytime Emmy Awards	May 13, 1995 (Daytime Creative Arts Emmy Awards); May 19, 1995 (main ceremony)	Outstanding Children's Animated Program	Steven Spielberg, Tom Ruegger, Sherri Stoner and Rich Arons	Nominated	
Daytime Emmy Awards	May 13, 1995 (Daytime Creative Arts Emmy Awards); May 19, 1995 (main ceremony)	Outstanding Music Direction and Composition	Steven Bernstein and Richard Stone	Nominated	
Daytime Emmy Awards	May 13, 1995 (Daytime Creative Arts Emmy Awards); May 19, 1995 (main ceremony)	Outstanding Achievement in Animation	Rich Arons, Barry Caldwell, Michael Gerard, Alfred Gimeno, Dave Marshall, Jon McClenahan, Rusty Mills, Audu Paden, Greg Reyna, Lenord Robinson, Andrea Romano, Peter Hastings, Nicholas Hollander, John P. McCann, Tom Minton, Deanna Oliver, Randy Rogel, Paul Rugg, Tom Ruegger, and Sherri Stoner	Nominated	
Daytime Emmy Awards	May 18, 1996 (Daytime Creative Arts Emmy Awards); May 22, 1996 (main ceremony)	Outstanding Children's Animated Program	Steven Spielberg, Tom Ruegger, Peter Hastings, and Rusty Mills	Won	
Daytime Emmy Awards	May 18, 1996 (Daytime Creative Arts Emmy Awards); May 22, 1996 (main ceremony)	Outstanding Achievement in Animation	Gordon Bressack, Charles M. Howell IV, Peter Hastings, Randy Rogel, Tom Ruegger, Paul Rugg, Liz Holzman, Audu Paden, Andrea Romano, Al Zegler, Joey Banaszkiewicz, Barry Caldwell, Brian Mitchell, John Over, Norma Rivera, Rhoydon Shishido, Marcus Williams, and Mark Zoeller	Won	
Daytime Emmy Awards	May 18, 1996 (Daytime Creative Arts Emmy Awards); May 22, 1996 (main ceremony)	Outstanding Music Direction and Composition	Steven Bernstein, Carl Johnson, and Richard Stone	Nominated	
Daytime Emmy Awards	May 7, 1997 (Daytime Creative Arts Emmy Awards); May 21, 1997 (main ceremony)	Outstanding Children's Animated Program	Steven Spielberg, Liz Holzman, Rusty Mills, Peter Hastings, Tom Ruegger, Charles Visser, Andrea Romano, Audu Paden, Jon McClenahan, Randy Rogel, John P. McCann, Paul Rugg, and Nick Dubois	Won	
Daytime Emmy Awards	May 7, 1997 (Daytime Creative Arts Emmy Awards); May 21, 1997 (main ceremony)	Outstanding Music Direction and Composition	Richard Stone, Steven Bernstein, and Julie Bernstein	Won	
Daytime Emmy Awards	May 9, 1998 (Daytime Creative Arts Emmy Awards); May 15, 1998 (main ceremony)	Outstanding Children's Animated Program	Steven Spielberg, Tom Ruegger, Rusty Mills, Liz Holzman, Andrea Romano, Mike Milo, Jon McClenahan, Charles M. Howell IV, Randy Rogel, Kevin Hopps, Gordon Bressack, Nick Dubois, and Tom Minton	Nominated	
Daytime Emmy Awards	May 9, 1998 (Daytime Creative Arts Emmy Awards); May 15, 1998 (main ceremony)	Outstanding Music Direction and Composition	Richard Stone, Steven Bernstein, Julie Bernstein, and Gordon Goodwin	Won	
Daytime Emmy Awards	May 15, 1999 (Daytime Creative Arts Emmy Awards); May 21, 1999 (main ceremony)	Outstanding Children's Animated Program	Steven Spielberg, Tom Ruegger, Rusty Mills, Liz Holzman, Randy Rogel, Kevin Hopps, Nick DuBois, Charles M. Howell IV, Earl Kress, Wendell Morris, Tom Sheppard, Andrea Romano, Stephen Lewis, Kirk Tingblad, Mike Milo, Nelson Recinos, Russell Calabrese, Herb Moore, and Dave Pryor	Nominated	
Daytime Emmy Awards	May 15, 1999 (Daytime Creative Arts Emmy Awards); May 21, 1999 (main ceremony)	Outstanding Music Direction and Composition	Richard Stone, Steven Bernstein, Tim Kelly, Julie Bernstein, and Gordon Goodwin	Won	
Nickelodeon Kids' Choice Awards	May 20, 1995	Favorite Cartoon	Animaniacs	Nominated	
Nickelodeon Kids' Choice Awards	May 11, 1996	Favorite Cartoon	Animaniacs	Nominated	
Nickelodeon Kids' Choice Awards	April 19, 1997	Favorite Cartoon	Animaniacs	Nominated	
Online Film & Television Association Awards	1997	OFTA Television Award for Best Animated Production	Animaniacs	Nominated	
Peabody Awards	March 31, 1994	Peabody Award	Animaniacs	Won	
TCA Awards	July 22, 1994	Outstanding Achievement in Children's Programming	Animaniacs	Nominated	
Young Artist Awards	1996	Best Family Animated Production	Animaniacs	Won	

== Legacy ==
Along with Taz-Mania and Freakazoid!, Animaniacs became a popular animated series towards an adult audience, leading to fan interest and several websites dedicated to the series. In 1995, over 21% of audiences during weekdays and over 23% of viewers on Saturday mornings were 25 years or older; a quarter of the audience were over the age of 24.

During the show's broadcast, a University of Toronto student created the internet newsgroup alt.tv.animaniacs for adult fans. Averaging from 80 to 100 posts per day, the newsgroup included lists of episode titles, quotations, and cultural references. Fans traded tapes, barbs, and information; debated adult jokes and cultural references; and wrote laundry tips on fading Animaniacs T-shirts and parody lyrics. Employees of Warner Bros. downloaded 1,200 pages of comments on the newsgroup each month. One episode of Animaniacs featured a caricature of the show's internet fans. Since 2016, Paulsen, Harnell, and MacNeille have toured as Animaniacs Live!, performing songs from the series with an orchestra.

== Franchise ==
=== Video games ===
Due to the popularity of the show, a total of nine video games were based on the Animaniacs series for various consoles. The list includes titles such as Animaniacs (1994), Animaniacs Game Pack! (1997), Animaniacs: Ten Pin Alley (1998), Animaniacs: A Gigantic Adventure (1999), Animaniacs: The Great Edgar Hunt (2005) and Animaniacs: Lights, Camera, Action! (2005). An additional game for the Game Boy Advance, titled Animaniacs: Hollywood Hypnotics, was produced but cancelled before release.

=== Revival ===
A revival series of Animaniacs was ordered by Hulu in May 2017 for an initial two-season order, following the popularity of the original series after Netflix had added it to its library in 2016. Spielberg was heavily involved with working on the revival and insisting on returning the original voice cast and its elements. Wellesley Wild served as the showrunner and as executive producer along with Gabe Swarr. The first season was released on November 20, 2020. The second season was released on November 5, 2021; the third and final season was released on February 17, 2023.

== Sources ==
=== Books ===
- Lawson, Tim; Persons, Alisa (2004a). "Maurice LaMarche". The Magic Behind the Voices: A Who's Who of Cartoon Voice Actors. University Press of Mississippi. pp. 208–210. ISBN 1-57806-695-6 – via Internet Archive.
- Lawson, Tim; Persons, Alisa (2004b). "Rob Paulsen". The Magic Behind the Voices: A Who's Who of Cartoon Voice Actors. University Press of Mississippi. p. 270. ISBN 1-57806-695-6 – via Internet Archive.
- Lenburg, Jeff (1999a). "Animaniacs [Theatrical Short]". The Encyclopedia of Animated Cartoons (Second ed.). New York, New York: Checkmark Books. pp. 51. ISBN 0-8160-3831-7.
- Lenburg, Jeff (1999b). "Steven Spielberg Presents Animaniacs [Television Series]". The Encyclopedia of Animated Cartoons (Second ed.). New York, New York: Checkmark Books. pp. 520. ISBN 0-8160-3831-7.
- Goldmark, Daniel (June 2, 2000). "An Interview with Richard Stone, Steve Bernstein, and Julie Bernstein". In Goldmark, Daniel; Taylor, Yuval (eds.). The Cartoon Music Book. A Cappella. p. 230. ISBN 1-55652-473-0 – via Internet Archive.
- Sandler, Kevin (1998). Reading the Rabbit: Explorations in Warner Bros. Animation. New Brunswick, New Jersey: Rutgers University Press. ISBN 0-8135-2538-1 – via Internet Archive.

=== Magazine articles ===
- Miller, Bob (October 1990). "New Toons on the Block: They're attending Acme Looniversity & hoping to graduate as classic cartoon characters". Comics Scene. No. 15. Starlog Group. pp. 38–39. Archived from the original on April 22, 2025.
