= My Favorite Martian (film) =

1999 comic science fiction film directed by Donald Petrie

- Theatrical release poster
- Directed by: Donald Petrie
- Written by: Sherri Stoner; Deanna Oliver
- Based on: My Favorite Martian by John L. Greene
- Produced by: Jerry Leider; Robert Shapiro; Marc Toberoff
- Starring: Christopher Lloyd; Jeff Daniels; Elizabeth Hurley; Daryl Hannah; Wallace Shawn; Christine Ebersole; Ray Walston
- Cinematography: Thomas E. Ackerman
- Edited by: Malcolm Campbell
- Music by: John Debney
- Production company: Walt Disney Pictures
- Distributed by: Buena Vista Pictures Distribution
- Release date: February 12, 1999
- Running time: 94 minutes
- Country: United States
- Language: English
- Budget: $65 million
- Box office: $36.8 million

My Favorite Martian is a 1999 American science fiction comedy film directed by Donald Petrie, written by Sherri Stoner and Deanna Oliver. The film is loosely based on the 1960s television series of the same name which starred Ray Walston, who also has a supporting role in the film. The film stars Christopher Lloyd, Jeff Daniels, Daryl Hannah, Elizabeth Hurley, Wallace Shawn, and Wayne Knight. A Mickey Mouse Works short, Pluto Gets the Paper: Spaceship, was shown in theaters with it.

My Favorite Martian was released in the United States on February 12, 1999 by Buena Vista Pictures Distribution under its Walt Disney Pictures label. The film received negative reviews from critics and was a box-office failure, grossing $36.8 million against a $65 million budget.

== Plot ==
The film opens on Mars, showing the last moments of a Mars rover's mission. As the rover prepares to sample Martian rock, it dies. The mission controllers congratulate themselves on a successful mission, while back on Mars the scene pans up from the dead rover to show a huge undiscovered Martian city. A spaceship is seen quickly rocketing from the city and accelerating into space.

News producer Tim O'Hara is fired for unwittingly compromising reporter Brace Channing, the daughter of his boss, Mr. Channing, during a live broadcast of the first Space Shuttle launch from Vandenberg Air Force Base. His assistant, Lizzie tries to comfort him and she apparently has a crush on him.

Later that night, while driving, Tim witnesses a small Martian spacecraft crash landing. Realizing his chance to deliver a story that will "rock the Earth", he brings Brace to show her the ship, but by the time he reaches the crash site, the ship has been shrunk to toy size. Nearby, its only occupant hides in the bushes. Tim takes the now-shrunken spaceship home with him and the Martian follows him to retrieve it. After a confrontation, Tim is knocked out and the Martian disguises himself with a "nerplex", a piece of alien gum that can transform anyone into another life form, to look like Tim and ends up kissing Lizzie when she visits.

When Tim confronts the Martian the next morning, he finds out that a small device called an "electron accelerator", which powers the control systems of the ship, is damaged beyond repair and the Martian needs Tim's help to find a replacement. The Martian takes the name "Uncle Martin" and explores the city with Tim, unaware that they are being watched by SETI, which discovered DNA left by Martin while hiding out at Tim's. While exploring Tim's neighborhood, Martin tells him about a friend of his named "Neenert", one of his planet's most gifted Martian scientists, who came to Earth in 1964, but never came back. Brace is captured by the SETI gang and is interrogated.

Tim secretly tapes Martin and his sentient suit, Zoot, with hidden cameras to back up his story and impress the television station staff in hopes of getting his job back, but he eventually decides not to reveal the tapes, as he has become fond of Martin. Meanwhile, Martin and Zoot discover a subsystem of the ship called the Interstellar Safety System, which is prepared to self-destruct.

Brace discovers the footage of Martin in his Martian form and she steals the tape. Lizzie shows up at Tim's house to discover Brace stealing the tape. Thinking that Tim cheated on her, Lizzie rejects him and storms out, only to be distracted by the now-full-sized spaceship and is pulled into the cockpit by Zoot. Martin and Tim go after the Martian evidence, shrinking the ship (along with Zoot and Lizzie) and racing down to the station, where Tim admits to Martin that he has been videotaping him, but says he likes Martin and apologizes. Accepting Tim's apology, Martin subdues Brace, disguising himself as her so he can take her place on the news and Martin's alien form is almost exposed during the broadcast, which is carefully watched by Elliott Coleye, head of SETI.

As footage from another news report is aired, Tim and Martin escape the station, pursued by SETI through the sewers in Tim's car, shrunken using Martin's device. They eventually end up in the hands of Coleye, who takes them back to SETI for investigation. At the lab, Tim tricks one of the scientists into growing Martin's ship to normal size, breaching security, and allowing Lizzie and Zoot to escape. However, the trio's escape is blocked by two security guards, one of whom shoots and injures Zoot. With the help of a black spiked nerplex, Lizzie transforms into a hideous monster from "Veenox 7", kills the guards, spits out the nerplex and turns back into a human.

The three eventually succeed in locating Martin, who has undergone surgery involving the removal of his antennae and putting him in a deathlike comatose state. When Martin and Zoot reunite, he comes back to life and wakes up. They then escape SETI headquarters and Tim and Lizzie prepare to bid farewell to Martin, installing a car alternator in place of the ship's damaged electron accelerator. However, they are interrupted by Coleye, who attempts to stop him from escaping; declaring that he will stop at nothing to prove the existence of aliens, even if it means killing Martin in the process. A SETI official named Armitan, revealed to be Martin's old friend Neenert, saves Martin by destroying Coleye's gun and then tossing Coleye wildly in the air. After a reunion, Martin and Neenert fly back to Mars on their ship; much to Coleye's dismay.

By chance, Coleye catches hold of the piece of nerplex left behind by Neenert. Believing that he can still prove his cause, while ignoring warnings from Tim and Lizzie, Coleye chews on it and he is turned into a Martian. Laughing in excitement and delight, Coleye accidentally swallows the gum. He ends up caught and tranquilized by his own organization, as Tim and Lizzie escape the scene.

In the end, Martin and Zoot decide to return to Earth and stay with Tim and Lizzie, while Neenert flies Martin's spacecraft back to Mars. Tim expresses initial reluctance to Martin's staying at first, but Lizzie convinces Tim to change his mind.

== Cast ==
- Christopher Lloyd as Uncle Martin / The Martian, a hapless alien stranded on Earth who must work with Tim to find a way to escape SETI and return to Mars.
- Jeff Daniels as Tim O'Hara, a down on his luck news producer who inadvertently becomes Martin's roommate and is soon drawn into danger when SETI becomes aware of Martin's presence.
- Elizabeth Hurley as Brace Channing, a serious reporter who will do anything to get ahead; she seduces Tim and steals information about Martin's true identity.
- Daryl Hannah as Lizzie, Tim's innocent, good-natured camera operator who is in love with him and is drawn into adventure once realizing Martin is from another world.
- Wallace Shawn as Dr. Elliott Coleye, a mischievous SETI scientist who will stop at nothing to capture Martin.
- Christine Ebersole as Mrs. Lorelei Brown, Tim's nosy, overbearing landlady. She develops romantic feelings towards Martin.
- Michael Lerner as Mr. Channing, Brace's father and head of the television station where Tim works.
- Shelley Malil as Felix, an assistant at the television station where Tim works.
- Jeremy Hotz as Billy
- T.K. Carter as Lenny
- Ray Walston as Armitan / Neenert, a long ago-stranded Martian who has been masquerading as a government operative for years. Walston starred in the original 1960s television series of the same name. This would be his final theatrical film role before his death in 2001.
- Michael Bailey Smith as The Big Guard, a SETI guard who shoots Zoot and tries to arrest Tim.
- Wayne Knight as the voice of Zoot, Martin's sentient, wise-cracking metallic suit. Knight is uncredited.
- Steve Bond as the SETI Group Driver
- Steven Anthony Lawrence as Nurplex Kid

== Production ==
=== Development ===
In 1993, writers Barry Strugatz and Mark Burns were tasked with writing the initial draft. The film was originally set up at Warner Bros. with Joe Dante attached to direct and Martin Short to star. The film was cancelled and put into turnaround, where it was picked up by Walt Disney Pictures. It was directed by Donald Petrie and written by Sherri Stoner and Deanna Oliver, based on the television series created by John L. Greene. Creatures were created by Amalgamated Dynamics from designs by Jordu Schell.

=== Casting ===
Christopher Lloyd was cast in April 1997. Elizabeth Hurley was cast in July.

=== Score ===
The score of the film is composed and conducted by John Debney, while the track "Uncle Martin Arrives" is written and composed by Danny Elfman. It also incorporated George Greeley's theme song from the television series of the same name.

== Critical reception ==
Roger Ebert gave it two stars out of four, remarking: "The movie is clever in its visuals, labored in its audios, and noisy enough to entertain kids up to a certain age. What age? Low double digits ... There are some good moments in My Favorite Martian. ... It looks as if everyone who made this film had a lot of fun." Film critic James Berardinelli described the film as "good-natured, appealing, and sophomoric," and noted that the "zaniness will appeal more to youngsters than to their parents, but there are instances when adults will find things to laugh at" and "this is entertainment of the lightest, most inconsequential sort." Writing in The New York Times, critic Lawrence Van Gelder reported that the film was "an amiable family entertainment" and that "Daniels and Lloyd are deft comedians [who] play off each other neatly."

The review aggregation website Rotten Tomatoes reports a 13% approval rating based on 40 reviews with an average rating of 3.38/10. The site's critical consensus reads: "Loud, effects-ridden comedy with no real humor." Metacritic, another review aggregator, gives the film a weighted average of 33 out of 100 based on 21 critics, indicating "generally unfavorable reviews". Audiences polled by CinemaScore gave the film an average grade of "B" on an A+ to F scale.

=== Box office ===
My Favorite Martian grossed $8,828,586 on its opening weekend. It had the widest release of 2,349 theaters. By the end of its run, the film had grossed $36,850,101 domestically against a $65 million budget.
