= Animaniacs Game Pack =

1997 video game

- North American cover
- Developer: Funnybone Interactive
- Publisher: Funnybone Interactive
- Platforms: Windows, Macintosh
- Release: 1997
- Genre: Arcade

Animaniacs Game Pack is a 1997 computer game based on the animated television series Animaniacs. It features five arcade games starring the Warner kids, Yakko, Wakko and Dot. It was published and developed by Funnybone Interactive. Voices for all characters in the games are provided by the voice actors who performed the roles for the television series. It was the first Animaniacs media to use digital ink and paint, mostly used in cutscenes. Also, it used 3D pre-rendered backgrounds in some games. The game is for ages 7 and up. In addition to the 5 games, the pack also came with Windows 95 desktop themes, icons and wallpapers.

== Games ==
=== Belchinator Too ===
This game stars Wakko Warner as the protagonist and The Brain as the antagonist. The Brain has created an army of robots at Acme Labs in his latest plot to take over the world, but they have rebelled against him and taken him prisoner, intending to use his vast intellect to destroy the world. Wakko must enter Acme Labs and destroy the robots by belching at them, fueled by the assorted snacks (power-ups) he finds along the way.

This game is the only one of the five that allows players to save their progress and resume play at a later time.

=== Prop Shop Drop ===
This game puts Yakko Warner to work collecting movie props for a crabby foreman. Players control Yakko on a bicycle as he rides through the studio, collecting the props while avoiding or jumping over obstacles. As Yakko proceeds, he can upgrade to a motorcycle or racecar to cover ground more quickly.

=== Smoocher ===
In Smoocher, Dot Warner must turn her nightmares into good dreams by blowing "smooches" (hearts) at the enemies to freeze them. Once they are frozen, Dot can run over them to eliminate them. She has only a limited supply of smooches and must collect more throughout the game. If she jumps and hits a stick of TNT, it will freeze every enemy on the screen.

=== Baloney's Balloon Bop ===
Baloney's Balloon Bop stars all three Warners as they try to pop balloons by bouncing Yakko upward on to a trampoline held by Wakko and Dot. Baloney the dinosaur runs along the bottom of the screen, under Wakko and Dot, and Yakko will lose a life if he misses the trampoline and is caught by Baloney. Some balloons contain power-ups, while others release anvils that will stun Baloney for a moment if they land on him. On later screens, unbreakable steel blocks appear among the balloons and a pterodactyl flies across the screen, replacing popped balloons unless temporarily stunned by a hit from Yakko.

=== Tee Off Mini Golf ===
The player controls Dot as she plays through a nine-hole miniature golf course loaded with unusual obstacles.

== Reception ==
Reception

Review scores
Publication	Score
All Game Guide	4.5/5
MacHome Journal	3.5/5

All Game Guide said "The games are hilarious and entertaining but I found myself going back to Baloney's Balloon Bop the most. There is just something extremely satisfying about dropping anvils on the head of a guy in a dinosaur costume or seeing him break apart, turn to ashes or become folded like an accordion. It's even more satisfying if Barney was your personal nemesis during his heyday".

MacHome Journal said "If nothing else, Animaniacs will have you chuckling on occasion, and with its relatively low price, it's a good buy".
