= Sherri Stoner =

American writer (born 1959)

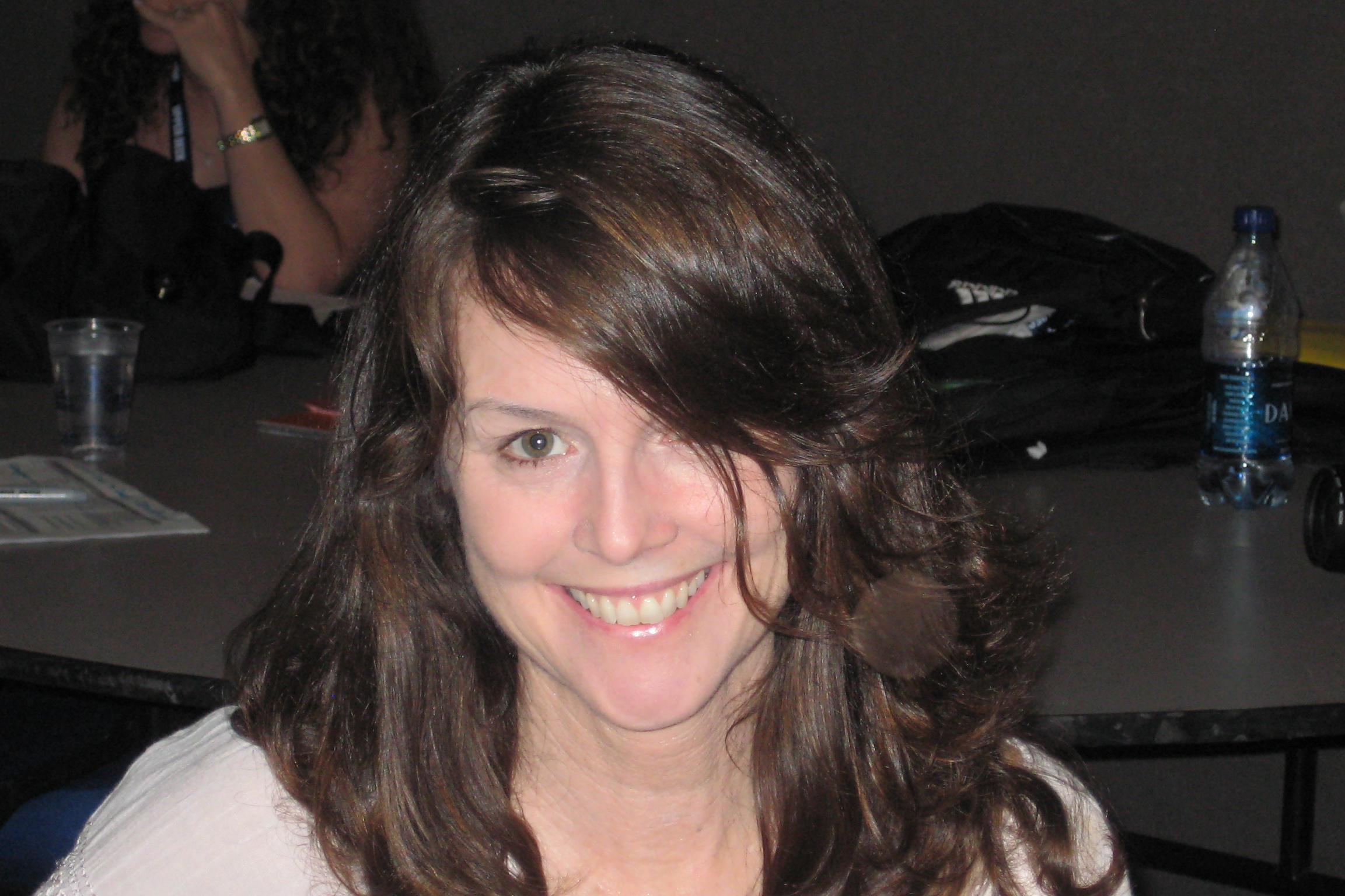
- Stoner in 2008
- Born: Sherri Lynn Stoner; July 16, 1959 (age 67); Santa Monica, California, U.S.
- Occupations: Writer; actress; animation producer
- Years active: 1980–present

Sherri Lynn Stoner (born July 16, 1959) is an American animated film producer, actress and writer. She is best known for her work on the animated television series Animaniacs as a writer, story editor, and the voice of Slappy Squirrel throughout its run and for one short segment in its revival. She co-developed the animated spin-off series The Spooktacular New Adventures of Casper and has written for series such as The 7D, Curious George, Work It Out Wombats!, and the film My Favorite Martian.

== Biography ==
She has worked extensively in animation. She was a writer and producer for such 1990s animated shows as Tiny Toon Adventures and Animaniacs. In Animaniacs, Stoner also voiced Slappy Squirrel, a grumpy elderly squirrel and retired cartoon star. In 2023, she reprised the role of Slappy Squirrel for the final episode of the Animaniacs revival.

She co-wrote (with Deanna Oliver) Universal's Casper and was on the writing staff of the 1996 revival of an animated Casper the Friendly Ghost, also known as The Spooktacular New Adventures of Casper. Stoner and Oliver wrote the Disney film My Favorite Martian, based on the original 1960s TV series.

Stoner served as animation reference model for Ariel in Disney's The Little Mermaid and for Belle in Beauty and the Beast. Animators for The Little Mermaid incorporated some of Stoner's mannerisms, such as biting her lower lip, into the character design of Ariel.

Stoner's live-action television work includes a recurring role as Rachel Brown Oleson in the 9th season of Little House on the Prairie, and appearances in Murder, She Wrote and Knots Landing. She worked with Tom Ruegger as story editor on Disney's The 7D.

On the big screen, Stoner starred alongside Wendy O. Williams in the 1986 film Reform School Girls. She was also a member of The Groundlings improvisational troupe in Los Angeles.

== Filmography ==
=== Acting ===
Year	Title	Role	Notes
1980	Knots Landing	Mary Ann	Episode: "Let Me Count the Ways"
1983	Little House on the Prairie	Rachel Brown Oleson	2 episodes
1986	Reform School Girls	Lisa	
1987	Murder, She Wrote	Sarah Martino	Episode: "Old Habits Die Hard"
1993–1998	Animaniacs	Slappy Squirrel (voice)	Recurring role (37 episodes)
1998	Pinky and the Brain	Slappy Squirrel (voice)	Episode: "Star Warners"
1999	Wakko's Wish	Slappy Squirrel (voice)	Direct-to-video
2015	The 7D	Nougat (voice)	Episode: "Big Rock Candy Flim-Flam"
2023	Animaniacs	Slappy Squirrel (voice)	Episode: "Slappy's Return"

=== Crew work ===
Year	Title	Role
1990–1992	Tiny Toon Adventures	Producer, writer (37 episodes)
1993–1995	Animaniacs	Producer, writer (67 episodes)
1995	Casper	Writer
1999	My Favorite Martian	Writer
2007	Animalia	Writer (3 episodes)
2014–2016	The 7D	Writer (44 episodes)
2017–2019	Mickey and the Roadster Racers	Writer (7 episodes)
2019–2022	Curious George	Writer (43 episodes)
2023	Work It Out Wombats!	Writer (18 episodes)
