= Deanna Oliver =

American actress and writer

- Occupations: Actress; writer
- Years active: 1982–present

Deanna Oliver is an American actress and writer. Oliver performed the voice of Toaster in the film The Brave Little Toaster (1987) and its sequels. In addition, she was a writer of the animated series Tiny Toon Adventures (1990) and Animaniacs (1993). Sherri Stoner worked with her for Universal's fantasy comedy Casper (1995) and Disney's My Favorite Martian (1999).

In addition to writing for animation, she currently teaches and directs main-stage shows at The Groundlings Theater in Hollywood.

== Filmography ==
Year	Title	Role	Notes
1982	Joanie Loves Chachi	Unknown	Oliver may have been a guest star.
1985	The Jeffersons	Pregnant woman	11x09
1987	The Brave Little Toaster	Toaster	Lead-role
1988	Newhart	Unknown	Oliver may have been a guest star.
1989	Aftershock	Dancer	
1993	Animaniacs	Writer	The Goodfeathers scripts and the character Chicken Boo.
1995	Casper	Writer	
1997	The Brave Little Toaster to the Rescue	Toaster	Lead-role
1998	The Brave Little Toaster Goes to Mars	Toaster	Lead-role
1999	My Favorite Martian	Writer	
