= Tom Minton =

American film producer

Tom Minton is an American animator, producer, writer, and storyboard artist. He created and wrote the "Toby Danger" episode of Freakazoid!, wrote the lyrics to the song "Brainstem" and served as the chief model for the Warner Bros. character the Brain in Pinky and the Brain. He was story editor of Ralph Bakshi's Mighty Mouse: The New Adventures, a 1987 series art-directed by John Kricfalusi.

He was the producer of Tom and Jerry: The Magic Ring (2001) and Baby Looney Tunes' Eggs-traordinary Adventure (2002). He was a writer/producer on Duck Dodgers (2003–2004), producer/story editor on Tom and Jerry Tales (2006) and a producer/story editor/writer of The Sylvester & Tweety Mysteries (1995–1999). He was a co-producer and co-writer of Tweety's High-Flying Adventure (2000). He is a multiple Emmy Award nominee for Disney's Raw Toonage, Tiny Toon Adventures, Animaniacs, The Sylvester & Tweety Mysteries and Baby Looney Tunes. He is a Peabody Award winner as a writer on Animaniacs. He has written several episodes for the hit Disney Channel animated series Phineas and Ferb and The Hub's Littlest Pet Shop.
