= Liz Holzman =

American film director

- Born: February 9, 1953; San Francisco, California, U.S.
- Died: August 11, 2014 (aged 61)
- Occupations: Film producer, director
- Years active: 1979–2014

Liz Holzman (February 9, 1953 – August 11, 2014) was an American film producer and director. She has won the Emmy Award three times, once for her work on the Warner Bros. animated series Pinky and the Brain and twice for Animaniacs. Holzman also received an Emmy nomination as a writer for Animaniacs and an Annie Award nomination for her direction on the same show. Among her other production credits are the animated series Baby Blues and The Zeta Project.

== Education ==
Holzman studied at Mills College and at the California Institute of the Arts, where she earned her MFA in film graphics. Formerly Holzman was the Animation Department Chair at the Art Institute of Portland.

== Painting ==
As a painter, Holzman has been represented in several gallery showings, specifically her landscape paintings. A tribute to her can be found in the popular online game World of Warcraft, in the Cathedral Square (coordinates 57,55).

== Death ==
She died on August 11, 2014, from cancer.
