= Jean MacCurdy =

American television executive

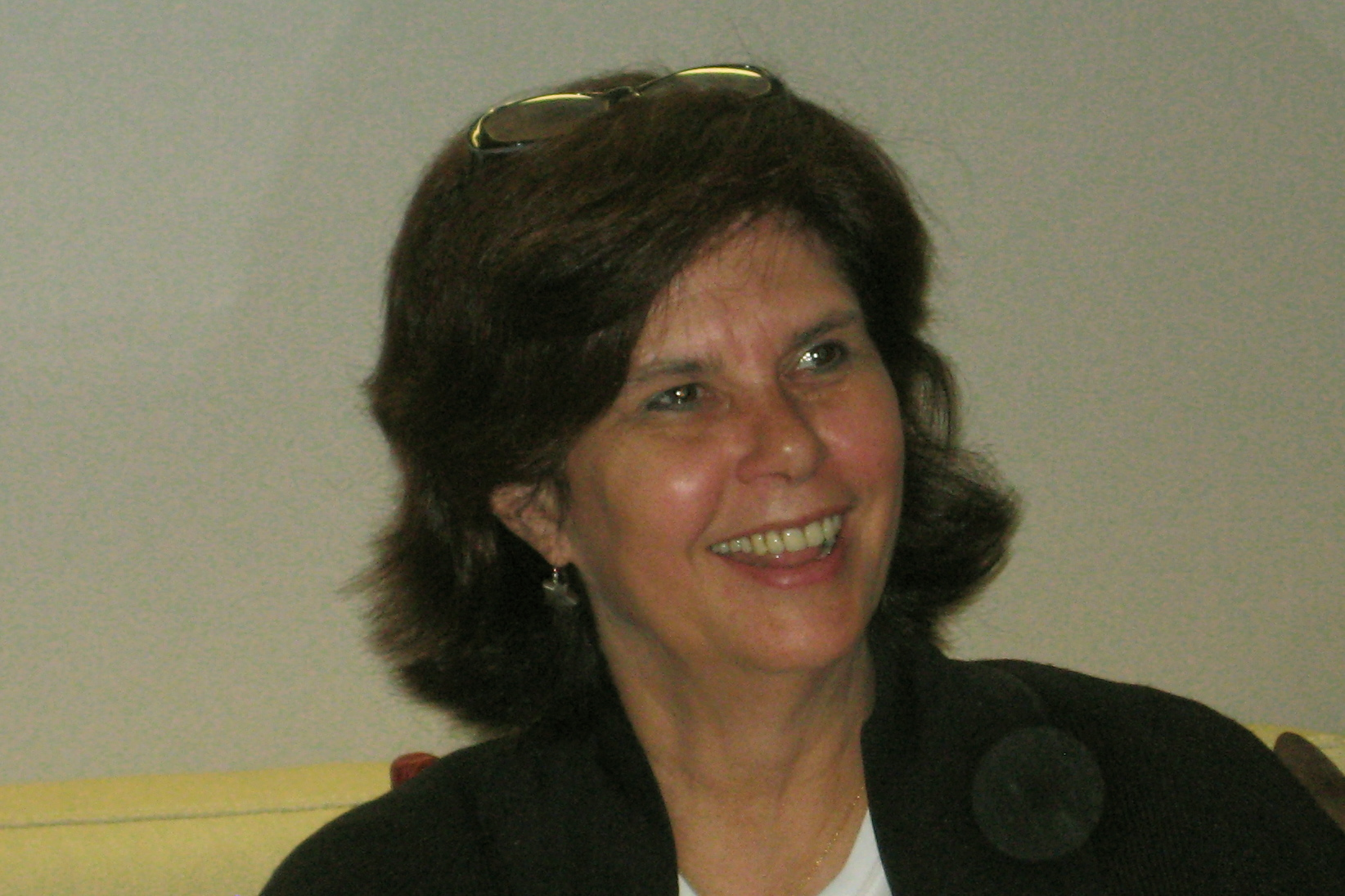
- Born: Jean H. MacCurdy
- Occupation: Television executive

Jean H. MacCurdy is an American television executive, best known for her role as president of Warner Bros. Animation from 1989 to 2001.

== Career ==
MacCurdy began her career as a secretary in the Children's Programming Department at the NBC Television Network in Burbank, California in 1974. In 1976 she was promoted to Manager of Children's Programs by Margaret Loesch, then Director of Children's Programs. In 1979, MacCurdy became director of animation programming in Warner Bros. Television. Later, she was hired by Warner Bros. Animation in 1980, and eventually became a vice president and general manager. In 1983, she left to become an executive (as a vice president of current programming and vice president of children's programming) for Hanna-Barbera, supervising the production of shows such as The Smurfs and Super Friends.

After a brief stint in 1988–89 at Marvel Productions as vice president of Production, MacCurdy was re-hired by Warner Bros. in November 1989 to establish a television animation production operation to produce original content for television. She hired several members of the creative team at Hanna-Barbera, including Tom Ruegger, Paul Dini, and later Alan Burnett, to form the creative team of her first Warner production, the Steven Spielberg-executive produced Tiny Toon Adventures, which ran in syndication.

In 1992, MacCurdy became president of the Warner Bros. Animation. Under MacCurdy's leadership, Warner Bros. Animation experienced a second renaissance, producing very popular children's programming and winning several Emmys. The company's output was expanded to include other successful programming for the Fox TV during the early 1990s such as Taz-Mania, Batman: The Animated Series, The Plucky Duck Show, Animaniacs, and Pinky and the Brain.

In 1995, Warner Bros. launched The WB television network, and made the Warner Bros. Animation shows exclusive to it. New shows produced for The WB's Kids' WB block included Superman: The Animated Series, Pinky and the Brain, Freakazoid!, The Sylvester & Tweety Mysteries, Road Rovers, Waynehead, Histeria, Batman Beyond, Detention and Pinky, Elmyra & the Brain. During MacCurdy's tenure, Warner Bros. Animation was also the parent company of Hanna-Barbera following the Time Warner/Turner merger, until it was absorbed into Warner Bros. Animation in 2001. MacCurdy resigned as head of Warner Bros. Animation in 2001, and was replaced by Sander Schwartz.

In 1997, MacCurdy was awarded the Women in Film Lucy Award in recognition of her work to enhance and improve the perception of women through the medium of television.

== Personal life ==
MacCurdy lives in the San Francisco Bay Area with her husband and companion of 45 years, William Hogan. She participated in the 2008 San Diego Comic-Con panel on the creation of Tiny Toon Adventures, Freakazoid!, and Animaniacs, in San Diego, California.

== Filmography ==
Years	Title	Notes
1983	The Dukes	Executive In Charge of Production
1983–1984	Pac-Man	Executive In Charge of Production
1983–1984	The New Scooby and Scrappy-Doo Show	Executive In Charge of Production
1983–1984	The Biskitts	Executive In Charge of Production
1983–1985	The Smurfs	Executive In Charge of Production
1984–1985	Challenge of the GoBots	Executive In Charge of Production
1985–1986	Paw Paws	Executive In Charge of Production
1985–1986	The Super Powers Team: Galactic Guardians	Executive In Charge of Production
1985	The 13 Ghosts of Scooby-Doo	Executive In Charge of Production
1990–1995	Tiny Toon Adventures	Executive In Charge of Production
1991–1995	Taz-Mania	Executive Producer
1992–1995	Batman: The Animated Series	Executive Producer
1992	The Plucky Duck Show	Executive In Charge of Production
1993–1998	Animaniacs	Executive In Charge of Production
1995–1999	The Sylvester & Tweety Mysteries	Executive Producer
1995–1997	Freakazoid!	Executive In Charge of Production
1995–1998	Pinky and the Brain	Executive In Charge of Production
1996–2000	Superman: The Animated Series	Executive Producer
1996–1997	Road Rovers	Executive In Charge of Production
1996–1997	Waynehead	Executive In Charge of Production
1997–1999	The New Batman Adventures	Executive Producer
1998–2000	Histeria!	Executive In Charge of Production
1998–1999	Pinky, Elmyra & the Brain	Executive In Charge of Production
1999–2001	Batman Beyond	Executive Producer
1999–2000	Detention	Executive Producer
2000–2002	Static Shock	Executive Producer
2001–2002	The Zeta Project	Executive Producer
2001–2002	Justice League	Executive Producer
