= Wayne Kaatz =

American writer

- Born: Las Vegas, Nevada, U.S.
- Occupations: Writer; actor

Wayne Kaatz (also credited as Wayne Katz) is an American writer and actor. His credits include episodes of the animated series Problem Child, Tiny Toon Adventures (on which he was also story editor), The Completely Mental Misadventures of Ed Grimley and The Brave Little Toaster.

In 1991, Kaatz, Tom Ruegger, and Bruce Broughton shared the Daytime Emmy Award for Outstanding Original Song for the Tiny Toon Adventures main title theme.

Kaatz was among the jurors in United States v. Elizabeth A. Holmes, et al. that reached a partial guilty verdict in January 2022. Kaatz spoke publicly after it concluded, saying "It's tough to convict somebody, especially somebody so likable, with such a positive dream."

== Filmography ==
=== Writing ===
==== Television ====
Year	Title	Notes
1987	Pound Puppies	4 episodes
1987	Yogi's Treasure Hunt	2 episodes
1988	A Pup Named Scooby-Doo	Episode: "The Babysitter from Beyond"
1988	The Completely Mental Misadventures of Ed Grimley	13 episodes
1990	Bill & Ted's Excellent Adventures	Episode: "A Most Excellent Roman Holiday"
1990–1992	Tiny Toon Adventures	14 episodes
1992	The Plucky Duck Show	3 episodes
1993–1994	Problem Child	13 episodes
1997	Pinky and the Brain	Episode: "Leave It to Beavers/Cinebrainia"

=== Acting ===
==== Film ====
Year	Title	Role	Notes
1986	Hannah and Her Sisters	Rossi - Thanksgiving Guest	Uncredited
1987	The Brave Little Toaster	Rob (The Master)	Voice
1987	Planes, Trains and Automobiles	Pilot	Uncredited
1991	Cool as Ice	Senator With Wife	Uncredited
1992	Tiny Toon Adventures: How I Spent My Vacation	Man on Movie Theater	Uncredited
1994	Tiny Toons Spring Break	Various	Uncredited
