= 18th Daytime Emmy Awards =

- Date: June 27, 1991
- Presented by: National Academy of Television Arts and Sciences
- Hosted by: Bob Barker

Highlights
- Outstanding Drama Series: As the World Turns
- Outstanding Game Show: Jeopardy!

Television/radio coverage
- Network: CBS

The 18th Daytime Emmy Awards were held on Thursday, June 27, 1991, on CBS, to commemorate excellence in American daytime programming from the previous year (1990). The awards were hosted by The Price Is Right host Bob Barker. For the first time, they aired in the evening, from 9 to 11 p.m. EST.

== Outstanding Drama Series ==
- As the World Turns
- All My Children
- Guiding Light
- The Young and the Restless

== Outstanding Lead Actor ==
- Peter Bergman (Jack Abbott, The Young and the Restless)
- David Canary (Adam Chandler & Stuart Chandler, All My Children)
- Nicolas Coster (Lionel Lockridge, Santa Barbara)
- A Martinez (Cruz Castillo, Santa Barbara)
- James Reynolds (Henry Marshall, Generations)

== Outstanding Lead Actress ==
- Finola Hughes (Anna Devane, General Hospital)
- Julia Barr (Brooke English, All My Children)
- Jeanne Cooper (Katherine Chancellor, The Young and the Restless)
- Elizabeth Hubbard (Lucinda Walsh, As the World Turns)
- Susan Lucci (Erica Kane, All My Children)

== Outstanding Supporting Actor ==
- Bernie Barrow (Louie Slavinski, Loving)
- William Christian (Derek Frye, All My Children)
- Stuart Damon (Alan Quartermaine, General Hospital)
- William Roerick (Henry Chamberlain, Guiding Light)
- Kin Shriner (Scott Baldwin, General Hospital)
- Jerry verDorn (Ross Marler, Guiding Light)

== Outstanding Supporting Actress ==
- Jess Walton (Jill Abbott, The Young and the Restless)
- Darlene Conley (Sally Spectra, The Bold and the Beautiful)
- Maureen Garrett (Holly Reade, Guiding Light)
- Jill Larson (Opal Cortlandt, All My Children)
- Kathleen Widdoes (Emma Snyder, As the World Turns)

== Outstanding Younger Actor ==
- Rick Hearst (Alan-Michael Spaulding, Guiding Light)
- Justin Gocke (Brandon Capwell, Santa Barbara)
- Bryan Buffington (Bill Lewis III, Guiding Light)
- Andrew Kavovit (Paul Ryan, As the World Turns)
- Kristoff St. John (Adam Marshall, Generations)

== Outstanding Younger Actress ==
- Anne Heche (Marley Hudson & Vicky Hudson, Another World)
- Tricia Cast (Nina Webster, The Young and the Restless)
- Kimberly McCullough (Robin Scorpio, General Hospital)
- Ashley Peldon (Marah Lewis, Guiding Light)
- Charlotte Ross (Eve Donovan, Days of Our Lives)

== Outstanding Drama Series Writing Team ==
- Santa Barbara
- All My Children
- As the World Turns
- The Young and the Restless

== Outstanding Drama Series Directing Team ==
- Santa Barbara
- All My Children
- Guiding Light
- The Young and the Restless

== Outstanding Animated Program ==
- Steven Spielberg, Tom Ruegger, Ken Boyer, Art Leonardi, Art Vitello, Paul Dini, and Sherri Stoner (Tiny Toon Adventures)
- Howie Mandel, Tom Tataranowicz, Bernard Wolf, Jim Staahl, Jack Heiter, John Callas, Mitch Schauer, Jim Fisher, Diane Dixon, Michael Wolf, and Phil Roman (Bobby's World)
- Cassandra Schafhausen, Nicholas Boxer, Andy Heyward, Larry Houston, Will Meugniot, Barbara Y.E. Pyle, Robby London, Thom Beers, Reed Shelly, Bruce Shelly, and Jim Duffy (Captain Planet and the Planeteers)
- Michael C. Gross, Robby London, Andy Heyward, Joe Medjuck, Len Janson, Chuck Menville, Will Meugniot, and Stan Phillips (Slimer! And the Real Ghostbusters)
- Sharman Divono, Jeff Hall, Tom Ray, Phil Roman, Mark Evanier, Bob Curtis, and Bob Nesler (Garfield and Friends)

== Outstanding Music Direction and Composition ==
- William Ross (Tiny Toon Adventures - "Fields of Honey")
- Johnny Costa (Mister Rogers' Neighborhood)
- Stephen James Taylor (Brother Future)
- Glenn A. Jordan, George S. Clinton, and Mark Mothersbaugh (Pee-wee's Playhouse)

== Outstanding Original Song ==
- Bruce Broughton (Music & Lyrics), Wayne Kaatz (lyrics), and Tom Ruegger (lyrics) - "Main title Theme". (Tiny Toon Adventures)
- A.J. Gundell - "Love Like This". (Guiding Light)
- Steve Dorff, and Gloria Sklerov - "If This Isn't Love". (As the World Turns)
- Roxanne Seeman (Music & Lyrics), Billie Hughes (Music & Lyrics) and Dominic Messinger (Music & Lyrics) – "Welcome To The Edge" (Santa Barbara)
