= Stephen Furst =

American actor (1954–2017)

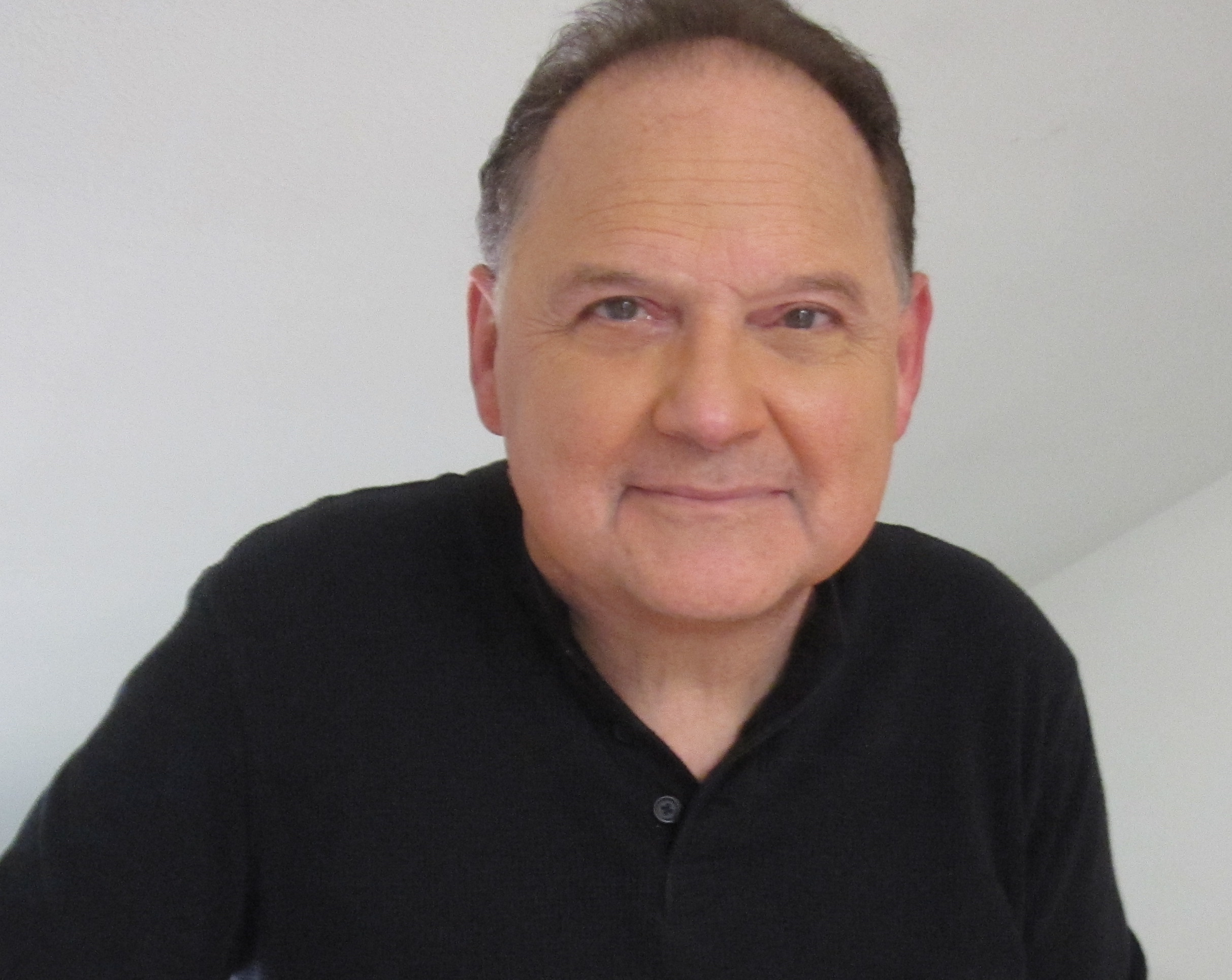
- Furst in 2014
- Born: Stephen Nelson Feuerstein; May 8, 1954; Norfolk, Virginia, U.S.
- Died: June 16, 2017 (aged 63); Moorpark, California, U.S.
- Education: Virginia Commonwealth University
- Occupations: Actor; director; producer
- Years active: 1973–2016
- Known for: Kent "Flounder" Dorfman in Animal House; Dr. Elliot Axelrod in St. Elsewhere; Vir Cotto in Babylon 5
- Spouse: Lorraine Wright (m. 1976)
- Children: 2
- Website: stephenfurst.com

Stephen Furst (born Stephen Nelson Feuerstein; May 8, 1954 – June 16, 2017) was an American actor, director and producer. After gaining attention with his featured role as Kent "Flounder" Dorfman in the comedy film National Lampoon's Animal House and its spin-off television series Delta House, he went on to be a regular as Dr. Elliot Axelrod in the medical drama series St. Elsewhere from 1983 to 1988, and as Centauri diplomatic attaché Vir Cotto in the science fiction series Babylon 5 from 1994 to 1998. Other notable film roles included the college comedy Midnight Madness (1980), as a team leader in an all-night mystery game, the action thriller Silent Rage (1982), as deputy to a sheriff played by Chuck Norris, and the comedy The Dream Team (1989), as a good-natured psychiatric patient.

== Early life ==
Born Stephen Nelson Feuerstein in Norfolk, Virginia, on May 8, 1954, Furst attended Virginia Commonwealth University. He was Jewish.

== Career ==
=== Acting ===
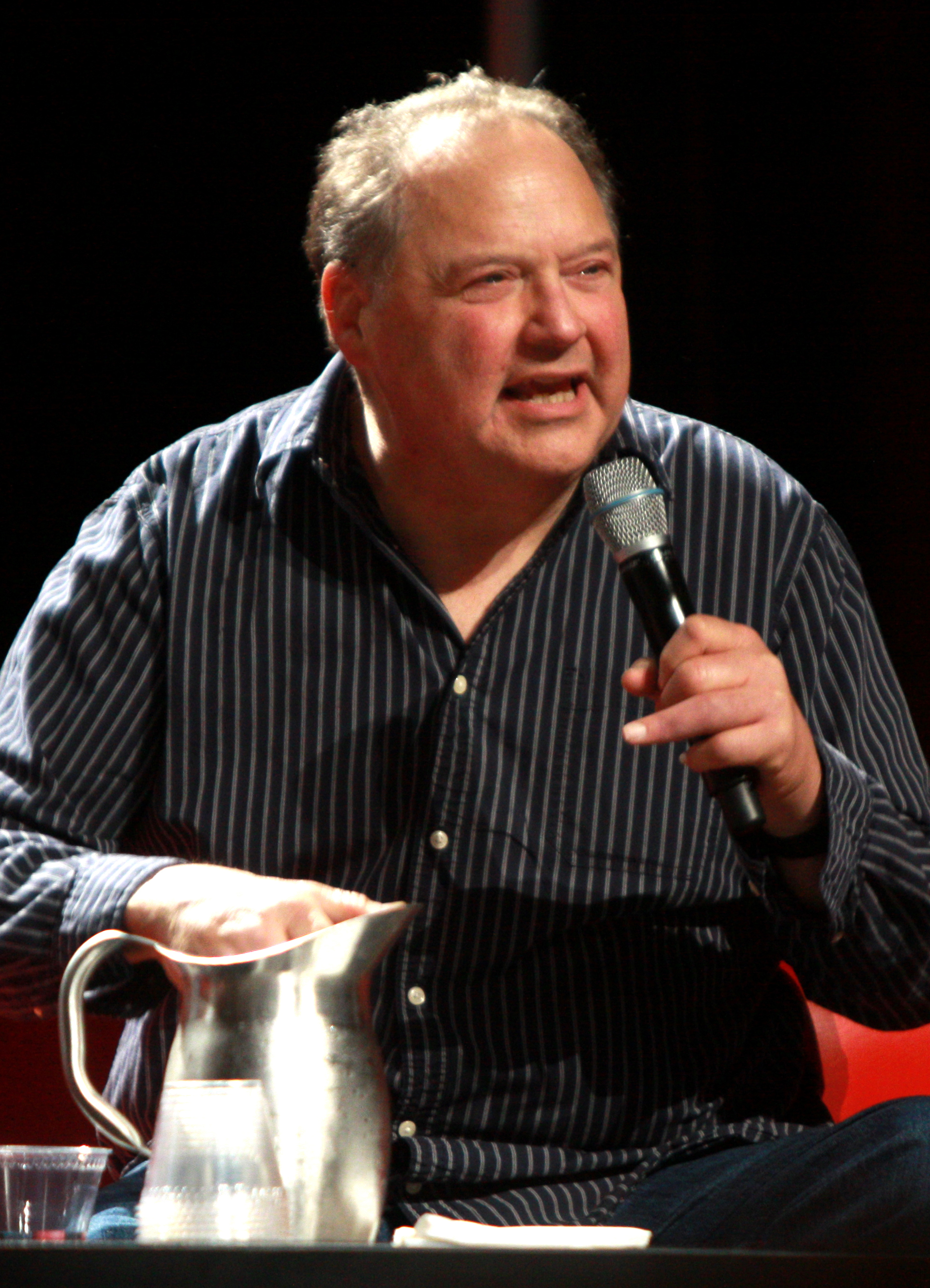
Furst at the 2013 Phoenix Comicon

Furst worked as a pizza delivery driver while looking for acting jobs in the mid-1970s, and included his head shot in pizza boxes. After Matty Simmons saw his photo, Furst was cast as Kent "Flounder" Dorfman in National Lampoon's Animal House (1978), reprising the role in the short-lived 1979 spin-off ABC sitcom Delta House, and repeating his famous line, "Oh boy, is this great!", as a school principal with a personality mirroring Flounder's in the music video for Twisted Sister's "I Wanna Rock."

Other roles include "Junior" Keller (the unseen) in the 1980 horror film The Unseen, Gonzer in the 1984 feature film Up the Creek, Dr. Elliot Axelrod in the television series St. Elsewhere (1983–1988), and Vir Cotto in the science fiction television series Babylon 5 (1994–1998). Furst was amused by an article that saw similarity between North Korean dictator Kim Jong Un's haircut and Furst's character in Babylon 5.

In 1979 he starred as an overweight high school tuba player coerced onto the wrestling team in Kieth Merrill's feel-good underdog film, Take Down. In 1980, he played the character of Harold in the film Midnight Madness. Furst appeared in 1982 in an episode of Newhart called "Sprained Dreams" where he played a Dartmouth College student. In 1983, he also appeared in a supporting role as Aldo in the ABC television film The Day After. In 1989, he played the character of Albert Ianuzzi in the film The Dream Team.

In 1983, Furst also appeared alongside Erik Estrada, Tom Reilly, and Heather O'Rourke in an episode of CHiPs titled "Fun House" as a student who belonged to the college fraternity "DDT".

In the 1995 animated TV series Freakazoid!, he voiced the character Fanboy. Also in 1995, he took a hiatus from Babylon 5 to star in a short-lived TV series, Misery Loves Company. In 1997, he played Derby Ferris in Little Bigfoot 2: The Journey Home. He also voiced a young Hathi in the second season of Disney's Jungle Cubs, had a starring voice role as Booster in the 2000 series Buzz Lightyear of Star Command and its direct-to-video prequel Buzz Lightyear of Star Command: The Adventure Begins, and voiced the walrus Dash in the 2000 Disney film The Little Mermaid II: Return to the Sea. He starred in Magic Kid and its sequel.

In 2002, he guest starred in an episode of Scrubs. In the same year, he was cast as Walter Nichols in the unaired pilot of the Nickelodeon television series Drake & Josh, but his identity was unknown in visuals, until his name was revealed in a YouTube video from 2017. He was replaced by Jonathan Goldstein prior to the series' debut, due to his unavailability for future episodes.

=== Directing and producing ===
Furst began directing with three episodes of Babylon 5; two in the fourth season and one in the fifth. Furst directed many independent and low-budget films, including the 2001 film Title to Murder, starring Christopher Atkins and Maureen McCormick, and the direct-to-video children's film Baby Huey's Great Easter Adventure. He also directed three low-budget films for the Sci Fi Channel: Dragon Storm in 2004, Path of Destruction in 2005, and Basilisk: The Serpent King in 2006; he also co-starred in the last two films.

Furst produced My Sister's Keeper, based on the Jodi Picoult novel, starring Cameron Diaz and Alec Baldwin. He produced several other films under his production company Curmudgeon Films. Atomic Shark aired in August 2016 on Syfy, during "Sharknado Week". Christmas in Homestead premiered on the Hallmark Channel during the holiday season of 2016. Cold Moon, a psychological thriller based on the Michael McDowell book, is set for a theatrical release in October 2017 in the United States. Cold Moon won "Best Horror Film" at the 2016 Laughlin Film Festival.

== Personal life ==
Furst was married to entertainment lawyer Lorraine Wright from 1976 until his death. The couple had two sons, both of whom are in the entertainment business. His older son Nathan (born 1978) is a television and film composer, while his younger son Griff (born 1981) is an actor, director and musician. Both of Furst's parents died from complications of diabetes. Shortly after his father's death, Furst was diagnosed with type 2 diabetes at age 17. He reached a weight of 320 pounds (150 kg) and had uncontrolled type 2 diabetes by the age of 40. After almost needing to have his left foot amputated due to diabetes complications in 1996, Furst reduced his weight from 260 pounds (120 kg) to 175 pounds (79 kg).

Starting in June 2006, Furst co-hosted the Renal Support Network's webcast Kidney Talk with Lori Hartwell. He became a spokesperson for the American Diabetes Association and authored the book Confessions of a Couch Potato. As a celebrity spokesperson for the American Heart Association, Furst said, "I thought I was more powerful than the disease of diabetes, but in reality, I was letting it take control of me. Now, I've decided to take control of my life."

=== 2016 criticism of the Academy of Motion Picture Arts and Sciences ===
Furst wrote a letter, later published in Variety, criticizing the portrayal of the members of the Academy of Motion Picture Arts and Sciences as racist and resistant to diversity and suggested the Academy's response to the 2016 #OscarsSoWhite campaign was ageist and sexist. He suggested that most members of the Academy did not watch the films nominated for awards, and that the Academy should start ensuring that those who voted had watched the films.

== Death ==
On June 16, 2017, Furst died from complications related to diabetes at his home in Moorpark, California, at the age of 63.

== Selected filmography ==
=== Film ===
Year	Title	Role	Notes
1977	Prime Time a.k.a. American Raspberry	Fat Gin Player	
1978	Animal House	Kent Dorfman	
1979	Take Down	Randy Jensen	
1979	Swim Team	Bear	
1979	Scavenger Hunt	Merle	
1980	Midnight Madness	Harold - Blue Team Leader	
1980	The Unseen	Junior Keller (The Unseen)	
1980	Getting Wasted	Marshall	
1982	Silent Rage	Charlie	
1982	National Lampoon's Class Reunion	Hubert Downs	
1984	Up the Creek	Gonzer	
1989	The Dream Team	Albert Ianuzzi	
1993	Magic Kid	Bob Ryan	
1994	Magic Kid 2	Bob Ryan	Also director
1995	Goldilocks and the Three Bears	Hawkins	
1998	Little Bigfoot 2: The Journey Home	Derby Ferris	
1999	Baby Huey's Great Easter Adventure	Baby Huey, Phantom Manager	Also director
1999	Deadly Delusions	Rev. Crane	
2000	Everything's Jake	Assistant Librarian	
2000	The Little Mermaid II: Return to the Sea	Dash (voice)	Direct-to-video
2000	Buzz Lightyear of Star Command: The Adventure Begins	Booster Sinclair (voice)	Direct-to-video
2001	Title to Murder	Oscar, the Security Guard	Also director
2001	Echoes of Enlightenment	House Foreclosure Agent	
2002	Sorority Boys	The Alum	
2003	Searching for Haizmann	Dr. Gaulforid	
2004	Wild Roomies	Mr. Nossee	
2006	Seven Days of Grace	Henry Henary III	
2010	John Belushi: Dancing on the Edge	Himself	Documentary

=== Television ===
Year	Title	Role	Notes
1978	The Bastard	Bertrand	Miniseries
1983–1988	St. Elsewhere	Elliot Axelrod	Recurring role
1983	The Day After	Aldo	Television film
1984	Off Sides (Pigs vs. Freaks)	Steamboat	Television film
1989	MacGyver	Dr. Kozby	Episode: "Renegade"
1990	Murder, She Wrote	Sgt. Paulsen	Episode: "Trials and Tribulations"
1994–1998	Babylon 5	Vir Cotto	Recurring role
1996	Howie Mandel's Sunny Skies	Various	2 episodes
1995–1996	Freakazoid!	Fanboy (voice)	3 episodes
1996	Road Rovers	Sport (voice)	Episode: "The Dog Who Knew Too Much"
2000–2001	Buzz Lightyear of Star Command	Booster Sinclair (voice)	Main cast (61 episodes)
2002	Drake & Josh	Walter Nichols	Unaired pilot
