= Tocci =

Tocci is an Italian surname. Notable people with the surname include:

- C. Lee Tocci, American writer
- Carlos Tocci, baseball player
- Giacomo and Giovanni Battista Tocci (1877–1894), Italian conjoined twins
- Ronald Tocci, American politician
- Terenzio Tocci (1880–1945), Italian politician

== See also ==
- Tocci Glacier, glacier of Victoria Land, Antarctica
