= Renal Support Network =

U.S. nonprofit organization

The Renal Support Network (RSN) is an American nonprofit, kidney patient-focused, kidney patient-run organization that focuses on individuals affected by chronic kidney disease (CKD).

RSN hosts its national patient meeting and regional patient lifestyle meetings and the RSN Patients Educating Patients & Professionals (PEPP) Patient Speakers Program. Information and education programs include the Kidney Times website and the KidneyTalk biweekly podcast. RSN sponsors Renal Teen Proms in Los Angeles and Washington, DC.

The Renal Support Network also provides lawmakers and policymakers with patient perspectives on the needs and capabilities of people with CKD through their Wellness & Education Kidney Advocacy Network (weKAN).

== History ==
The Renal Support Network was founded in 1993 by Lori Hartwell.

== Meetings ==
The national meeting is a three-day conference held in conjunction with the National Renal Administrators Association (NRAA) annual meeting. Regional Patient Lifestyle meetings are free to attend.

== Activities ==
In addition to contributing to educational and scientific publications, the Wellness & Education Kidney Advocacy Network (weKAN) consists of chronic kidney disease (CKD) patient activists from across the country.

The PEPP Patient Speakers Program was initiated by RSN in 2005. Since then, there have been over 100 speaking engagements to more than 9800 listeners. These educational programs are led by CKD patient-speakers who have been professionally authorized to deliver these programs at meetings of renal patients and healthcare professionals. PEPP speakers are available at no charge to organizations that meet the RSN criteria.

"Kidney Times" is the organization's CKD information website; all articles are all written by people with CKD or health care professionals. A stipend is paid for articles published. Kidney Talk is a biweekly webcast hosted by Stephen Furst and RSN Founder and President Lori Hartwell.

Renal Teen Proms are free events are for teens ages 14 to 24 who have CKD and a guest of their choice.
