= Title to Murder =

2001 film by Stephen Furst

- Directed by: Stephen Furst
- Written by: Cynthia Tocci; Laurence Carnes Tocci; Tom Seiler
- Starring: Maureen McCormick; Christopher Atkins
- Cinematography: Rolf Solstad
- Edited by: Mark E. Twohig
- Music by: Richard John Baker; Patrick O'Sullivan
- Production company: Deco L.A. Productions
- Distributed by: Alpha Entertainment
- Release date: May 15, 2001; (Cannes Film Festival)
- Running time: 102 minutes
- Country: United States
- Language: English

Title to Murder is a 2001 American action romantic comedy independent film directed by Stephen Furst and starring Maureen McCormick and Christopher Atkins. Based on a story by C. Lee Tocci, it had its world premiere on May 15, 2001 at the Cannes Film Festival.

== Plot summary ==
While researching an ordinary real estate transaction, title examiner Leah Farrell (McCormick) discovers a property transfer document with the forged name of a missing woman, and proceeds to investigate. When she is threatened by gangsters for snooping around, she turns for help to Assistant District Attorney Paul Shaughnessy (Atkins). As Paul tries to protect Leah from the danger that looms from all sides, romance blooms. The two of them foil the plot to bring illegal gambling activities to a small seaside town in Massachusetts.

== Cast ==
- Maureen McCormick as Leah Farrell
- Christopher Atkins as Paul Shaughnessy
- Laurie Gould as Rose
- Fredrick Burton as Everett Kincaid
- Tom Seiler as Tom Baxter
- Rachel Palleschi as Stacy
- Ted Garland as Agt. Bonner
