= Lori Hartwell =

American writer and activist (born 1966)

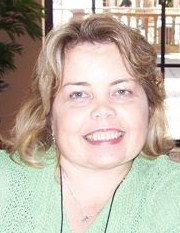
- Hartwell in 2005
- Born: 1966 (age 59–60)
- Occupation: President of the Renal Support Network
- Known for: Founder of the Renal Support Network and author of "Chronically Happy: Joyful Living in Spite of Chronic Illness"

Lori Hartwell (born 1966) is the Founder and President of the Renal Support Network, author of Chronically Happy: Joyful Living in Spite of Chronic Illness, and co-host of KidneyTalk, a biweekly webcast of issues of interest to those with Chronic Kidney Disease (CKD).

== CKD history ==
Diagnosed with CKD at the age of 2 in 1968, Hartwell has had 12 years of dialysis and four transplants.

== Renal Support Network ==
Hartwell founded the Renal Support Network (RSN) in 1993 as an American nonprofit, kidney patient-focused, kidney patient-run organization to benefit individuals affected by CKD. Hartwell began an annual Renal Teen Prom in 1999. As of 2008 nine Renal teen Proms have been held in Los Angeles and one in Washington DC.

== KidneyTalk ==
Hartwell co-hosts a bi-weekly webcast called "KidneyTalk" with Stephen Furst. The shows run about 30 minutes covering topics of interest to those with CKD. KidneyTalk's first show was on June 6, 2006.

== Awards ==
- Received the "2003 Quality of Life" award from Nephrology News & Issues Magazine
- In October 2005 received the “Women in Business Award,” presented by the California State Legislature
- Named "2005 Woman of the Year" by California State Senator Jack Scott.

== Publications ==
Hartwell has contributed to several educational and scientific publications including in peer-reviewed journals.

== Bibliography ==
- Hartwell, Lori. (2002). Chronically Happy: Joyful Living In Spite Of Chronic Illness Poetic Media Press. ISBN 0-9722783-0-3
