= Tiny Toon Adventures =

American animated television series

- Also known as: Steven Spielberg Presents Tiny Toon Adventures; Tiny Toons
- Genre: Comedy; Satire; Slapstick
- Created by: Tom Ruegger
- Based on: Looney Tunes by Warner Bros.
- Developed by: Tom Ruegger; Ken Boyer; Paul Dini
- Voices of: Charlie Adler; Tress MacNeille; Joe Alaskey; Don Messick; Gail Matthius; Kath Soucie; Maurice LaMarche; Frank Welker; Rob Paulsen; Danny Cooksey; Cree Summer; Jeff Bergman; Candi Milo; Noel Blanc; June Foray; Jim Cummings; John Kassir (Note: Season 3); Stan Freberg; Bob Bergen; Greg Burson
- Theme music composer: Bruce Broughton
- Opening theme: "Tiny Toon Adventures Theme" (performed by Charlie Adler, Tress MacNeille, and Joe Alaskey)
- Composers: Bruce Broughton; Steven Bernstein; Steven Bramson; Don Davis; John Debney; Carl Johnson; Albert Lloyd Olson; William Ross; Arthur B. Rubinstein; Fred Steiner; Morton Stevens; Richard Stone; Stephen James Taylor; Mark Watters
- Country of origin: United States
- Original language: English
- No. of seasons: 3
- No. of episodes: 98 (233 segments) (list of episodes)

Production
- Executive producer: Steven Spielberg
- Producers: Tom Ruegger (Note: Season 1); Sherri Stoner (Note: Seasons 2–3)
- Running time: 22 minutes
- Production companies: Amblin Entertainment; Warner Bros. Animation; Warner Bros. Domestic Television Distribution

Original release
- Network: CBS
- Release: September 14, 1990
- Network: First-run syndication
- Release: September 17, 1990 – February 24, 1992
- Network: Fox Kids
- Release: September 14 – December 6, 1992

Related
- Taz-Mania (1991–1995); The Plucky Duck Show (1992); Tiny Toon Adventures: How I Spent My Vacation (1992); Animaniacs (1993–1998); Freakazoid! (1995–1997); Pinky and the Brain (1995–1998); Pinky, Elmyra & the Brain (1998–1999); Animaniacs (2020–2023); Tiny Toons Looniversity (2023)

Tiny Toon Adventures, also known simply as Tiny Toons, is an American animated comedy television series created by animator Tom Ruegger and produced by Warner Bros. Animation and Amblin Entertainment. The series follows the adventures of a group of young cartoon characters who attend Acme Looniversity to become the next generation of characters from the Looney Tunes series.

The series originated in the late 1980s as an idea by Warner Bros. Animation president Terry Semel, who proposed a show featuring either young versions or offspring of the original Looney Tunes and Merrie Melodies characters. With Steven Spielberg serving as executive producer, the new characters were modeled on Looney Tunes characters but shared no familial relationship. The project was developed as an animated film for two years before being reworked into a television series. After character design sessions and story meetings, production began in April 1989 and concluded in 1991, with Spielberg approving every production aspect of each episode. The first episode, "The Looney Beginning", aired as a prime-time special on CBS on September 14, 1990. The series subsequently ran in first-run syndication from September 17, 1990, to February 24, 1992. The final season was broadcast on Fox's Fox Kids block from September 14 to December 6, 1992.

Tiny Toon Adventures received generally favorable reviews from critics and won seven Daytime Emmy Awards, a Young Artist Award, and an Environmental Media Award. It was also nominated for two Annie Awards and two Primetime Emmy Awards. A direct-to-video film spin-off, Tiny Toon Adventures: How I Spent My Vacation, was released in 1992, followed by two specials aired on Fox Kids in 1994 and 1995. The Plucky Duck Show, a spin-off television series, was created for Fox Kids and ran for one season in 1992. A second spin-off series, Pinky, Elmyra & the Brain, ran on The WB's Kids' WB block for one season from 1998 to 1999. From 2023 to 2025, a reboot titled Tiny Toons Looniversity streamed on HBO Max and aired on Cartoon Network.

== Premise ==
The series' main characters. Top row from left to right: Calamity, Dizzy, Sweetie, Montana, Elmyra and Little Beeper. Bottom row: Concord, Fifi, Furrball, Plucky, Shirley, Buster, Babs, Li'l Sneezer and Hamton.

The series follows a group of teenagers with traits modeled after the Looney Tunes characters. The characters are residents of the fictional city of Acme Acres and attend Acme Looniversity. Buster Bunny is a 14-year-old rabbit who is aware he is hosting a cartoon show. His 14-year-old energetic co-host and friend, Babs Bunny, specializes in voice impressions and lives with her large family in a burrow in Acme Forest. Plucky Duck dreams about wealth, fame, and power. Hamton J. Pig is a nerdy, shy pig with an obsession with food and low self-esteem. Fifi La Fume is a French skunk with an obsession with boys. Montana Max is a wealthy 14-year-old boy who lives in the largest mansion in Acme Acres.

Elmyra Duff is a little girl with a passion for animals. Dizzy Devil is a Tasmanian devil party animal looking for events to crash. Shirley "The Loon" McLoon is a waterfowl who has the ability to mind read and project her aura. Furrball is a homeless kitten. Calamity Coyote is a mute coyote nerd and inventor. Little Beeper is a roadrunner whose goal is to run "the world's first five-second decathlon." Acme Looniversity's professors include Bugs Bunny, Daffy Duck, and Porky Pig.

Other recurring characters include Gogo Dodo, who resides in Wackyland; a devious canary named Sweetie Pie; the talkative mouse Li'l Sneezer; the muscular Arnold the Pit Bull; and the shy Concord Condor.

== Episodes ==
| Season | Episodes | | Originally released | | |
| Season | Episodes | | First released | Last released | Network |
|---|---|---|---|---|---|
| 1 | 65 | 1 | September 14, 1990 | | CBS |
| 1 | 65 | 64 | September 17, 1990 | March 29, 1991 | First-run syndication |
| 2 | 13 | | September 16, 1991 | February 24, 1992 | First-run syndication |
| How I Spent My Vacation | | | March 11, 1992 | | Direct-to-video |
| 3 | 20 | | September 14, 1992 | December 6, 1992 | Fox (Fox Kids) |
| Specials | 2 | | March 27, 1994 | May 28, 1995 | Fox (Fox Kids) |

== Production ==
=== Development ===
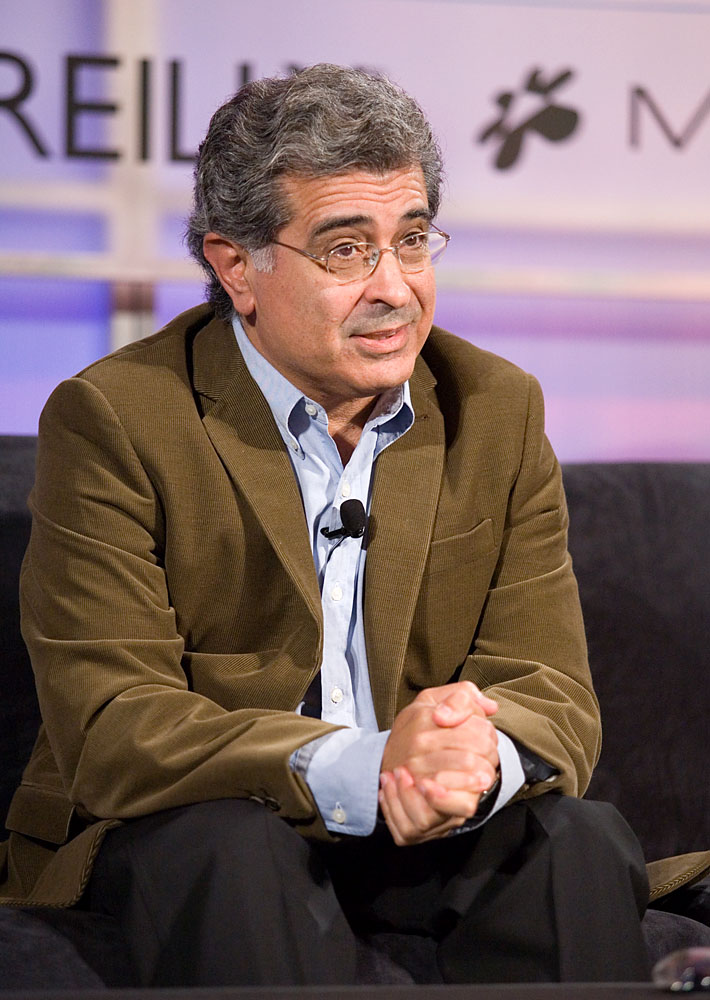
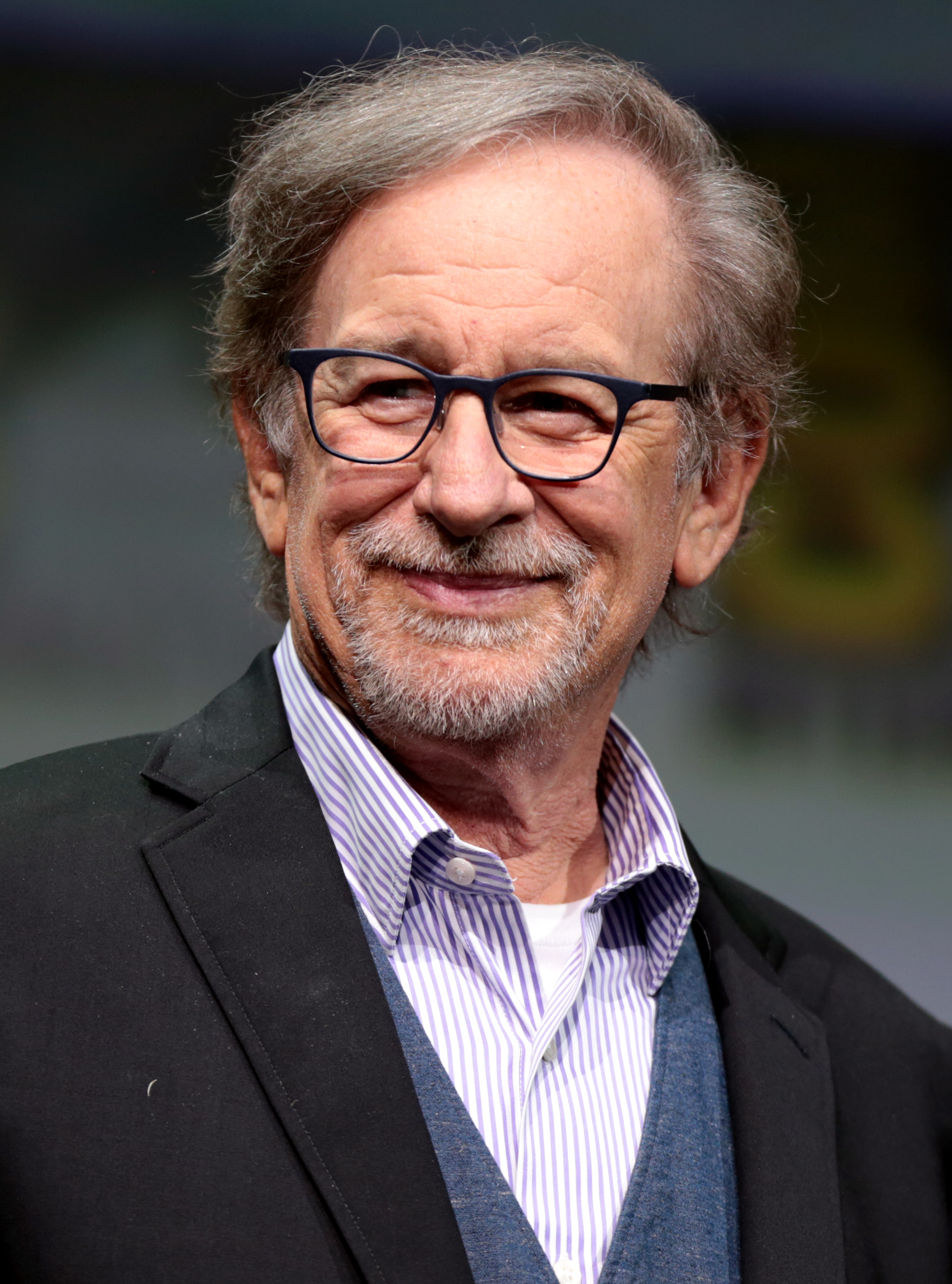
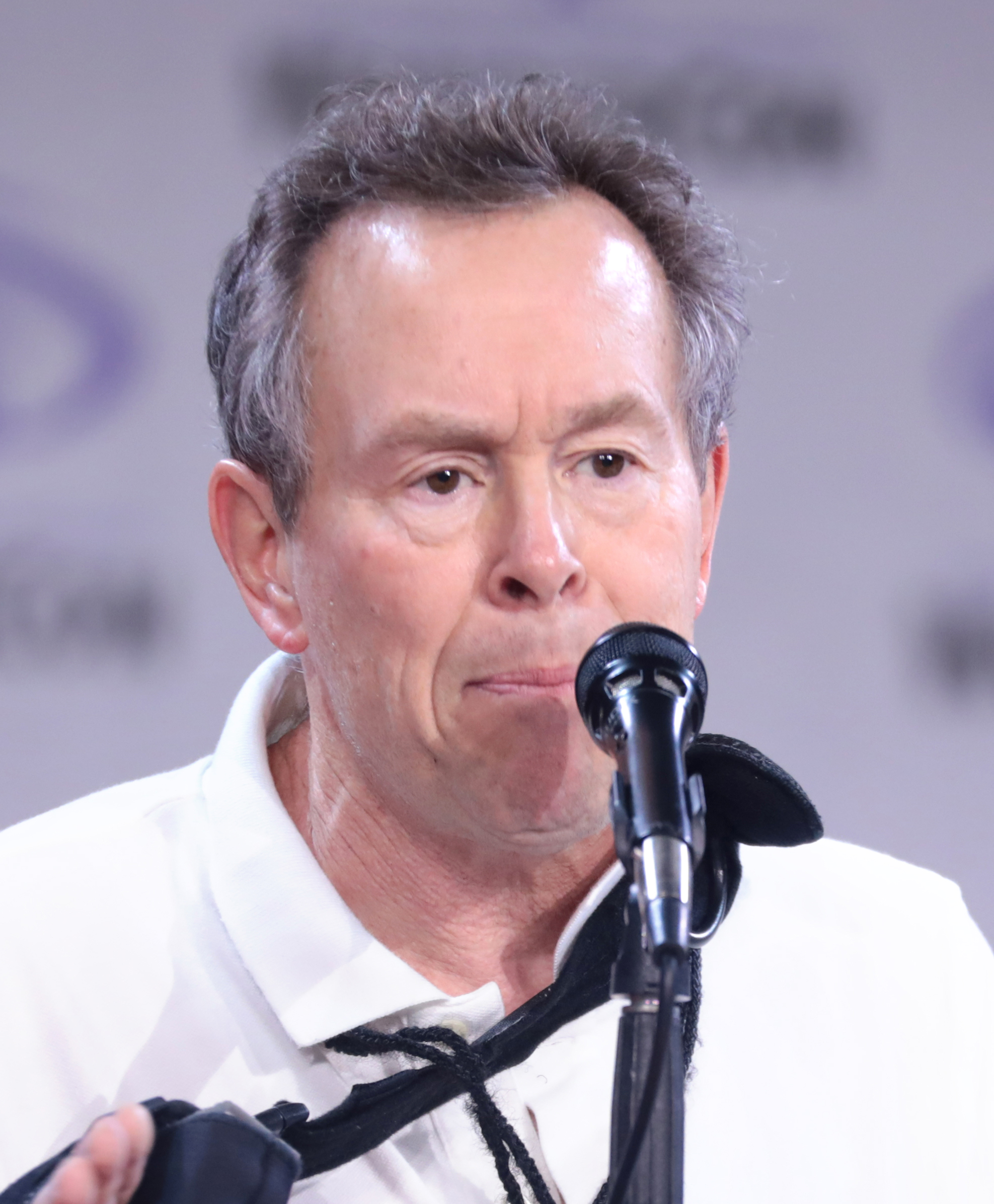
Terry Semel in 2005 (left), Steven Spielberg in 2017 (middle), and Tom Ruegger in 2023 (right)

Originally titled Tiny Tunes, the series was conceived by Warner Bros. president Terry Semel, who wanted to revitalize Warner Bros. Animation by creating a show based on the Looney Tunes series. He envisioned a story where the characters were either young versions or offspring of the original Looney Tunes and Merrie Melodies characters. In 1987, Warner Bros. approached Amblin Entertainment chairman Steven Spielberg to develop a film based on Semel's concept. During discussions with Tom Ruegger, Spielberg wanted the new characters to resemble the older characters and reflect the sensibilities of the 1990s. Ruegger and Spielberg decided that the new characters would be similar to the Looney Tunes characters but with no relation, with Spielberg involved with the creation of several of them.

Warner Bros. Animation initially planned Tiny Toon Adventures as an animated film, developing the project for two years. By December 1988, the studio had turned the project into a television series. In January 1989, Spielberg announced the series, and a 100-member production team was organized. After three days of discussions between Ruegger, Warner Bros. Animation president Jean MacCurdy, and animator Mitch Schauer, new characters were created; their names were finalized by Eddie Fitzgerald, Tom Minton, and Jim Reardon. Animator Ken Boyer developed the series bible and designed 14 characters with a few modifications by other artists. Spielberg approved the concept and its new characters, which were finished in one week.

Production of Tiny Toon Adventures began in April 1989. Warner Bros. Animation established several production units modeled on the studio's theatrical shorts system. Working at a pace three to four times faster than the previous Warner Bros. shorts, each unit had a director supervising the production of selected episodes. To follow the tradition of Warner Bros. shorts, many artists who had produced television animation in other studios had to be reeducated to achieve a "free-form" style for the series. The production process for each episode took 34 weeks, including four to six weeks of preparation, 14 weeks of pre-production, and four to six weeks of post-production, at an estimated cost of $400,000 per episode. Steven Spielberg was involved with the development, personalities, and designs of the characters as well as the overview of the series. Each production aspect required Spielberg's approval, and he wrote notes to the production team whenever he declined any.

Warner Bros.' animation department produced the series with a budget of $25 million for the first season. Production of the first season spanned a year and a half, with the animation department growing from 15 to 120 artists in many weeks. Each production unit created approximately 15 episodes during the first season. By late October 1990, the first season was nearly completed, and production concluded in 1991.

=== Writing ===
In March 1989, Paul Dini was hired as story editor and tasked with developing the show's characters. Later that year, Sherri Stoner joined Dini as story editor, with the two writing stories together in sessions. The series was originally intended to consist of three six-minute shorts per episode, but ended up varying from a set of shorts to half-hour episodes. The second-season episode "Buster and Babs Go Hawaiian" was co-written by Renee Carter, Amy Crosby, and Sarah Creek, who were fans of the series and in eighth grade at the time.

Because the series did not focus on Bugs Bunny, Daffy Duck, and other Looney Tunes characters, the writing process during development was difficult. Characters such as the Tasmanian Devil and Foghorn Leghorn were developed to represent adults who "talk too much or are stick-in-the-mud types" as foils for the Tiny Toons. Because the series was syndicated, the writers could use physical humor that would be restricted by networks running Saturday-morning cartoons. Despite this creative freedom, Spielberg declined to let Montana Max and other characters use handguns and rifles. War toys, tanks, and bombs were also not allowed, with violence kept strictly to anvils and dynamite. To emphasize the show's humor, the writers entertained themselves by adding their own jokes, relying heavily on dialogue to propel the characters. Adult humor was also applied to continue the legacy of Looney Tunes.

=== Voice actors ===
==== Main cast ====
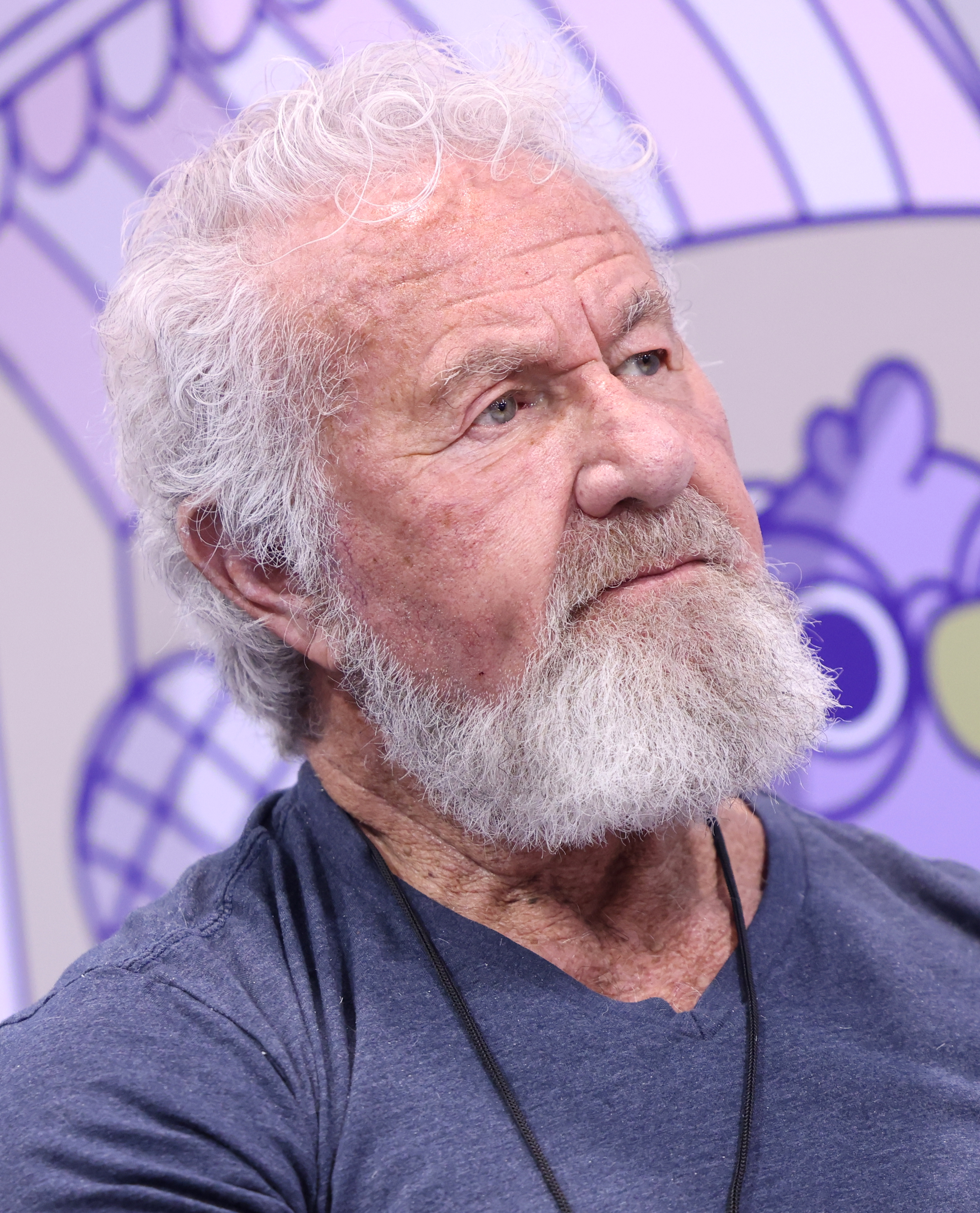
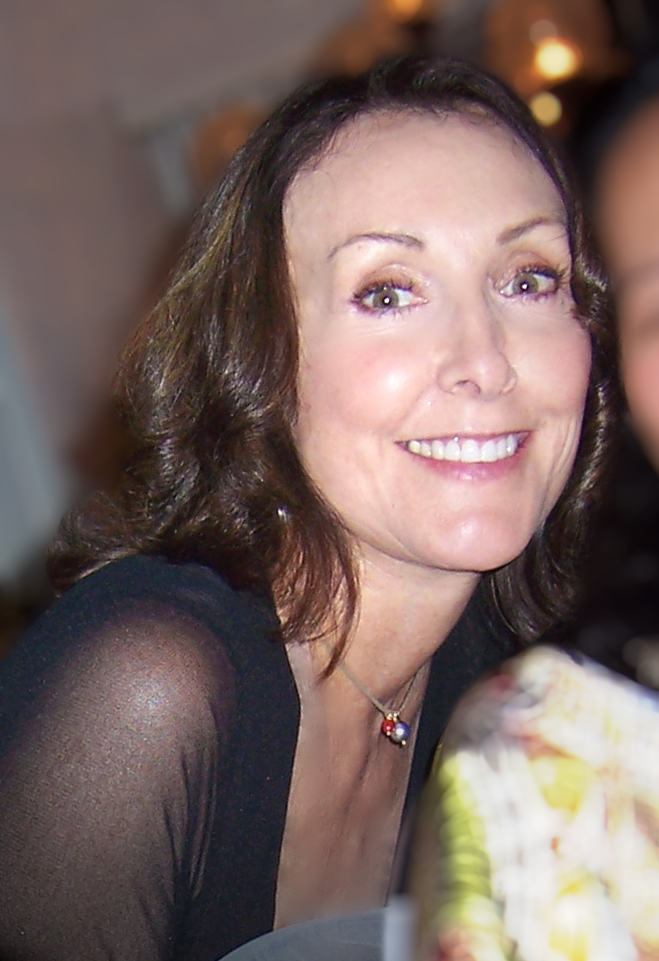
Charlie Adler (pictured in 2026) and Tress MacNeille (pictured in 2007) voiced Buster Bunny and Babs Bunny.
- Charlie Adler as Buster Bunny
- John Kassir as Buster Bunny (season 3)
- Tress MacNeille as Babs Bunny, Babs's mother and sisters
- Joe Alaskey as Plucky Duck
- Don Messick as Hamton J. Pig
- Danny Cooksey as Montana Max
- Cree Summer as Elmyra Duff and Mary Melody
- Kath Soucie as Fifi La Fume and Li'l Sneezer
- Maurice LaMarche as Dizzy Devil and Tazmanian Devil
- Frank Welker as Furrball, Gogo Dodo, Calamity Coyote and Little Beeper
- Rob Paulsen as Arnold the Pit Bull and Fowlmouth
- Stan Freberg as Junior Bear and Pete Puma
- Candi Milo as Sweetie Pie
- Gail Matthius as Shirley "The Loon" McLoon

Most one-time and background characters are voiced by Jim Cummings, Jeff Bergman, Bob Bergen, Noel Blanc, and Greg Burson. Guest vocal cameo performances were provided by actors including Vincent Price and Carol Kane.

==== Casting ====
While the series was being developed, Andrea Romano was conducting several auditions for voice actors in less than three months. Recording sessions began in 1989 at B&B Sound in Burbank, California. Ruegger and Romano sat in the studio and directed the actors, with an animation director joining them when scheduling permitted. Some episodes were re-recorded with different readings to revise the dialogue and the tone of their performances.

Adler was cast as Buster Bunny for the first two seasons due to the energy he brought to the character. MacNeille was selected to voice Babs because of her extensive vocal range, which supported the character's voice impressions. Cooksey used a "tremendous mean voice" for Montana Max by screaming frequently.

Before auditioning for Dizzy, LaMarche had wanted to work on a project produced by Spielberg, but was less optimistic about his chances because he felt he resembled a "shloob". Mel Blanc was initially considered to reprise his Looney Tunes roles; several of them were recast with Bergman following Blanc's death in 1989. Bergman, Bergen, Alaskey, Blanc, and Burson alternated voicing other Looney Tunes characters.

=== Designs and storyboards ===
During development, Boyer created the original designs, model sheets, poses, and turnarounds of 14 characters by emphasizing their heads and feet, with Gimeno assisting with character design and Ruegger suggesting the "demented" design of Sweetie Pie. Two character designs for Hamton J. Pig were created by Boyer and Jeff Pidgeon. Pidgeon's design was selected to differentiate the character from Porky Pig. To allow Hamton J. Pig to scratch his head, approved model sheets were discarded to alter his proportions.

Approximately 50 people worked on storyboards, color keys, and character models, including storyboard artists Reardon, Minton, and Fitzgerald. Storyboard artists were assigned by an episode's director to illustrate one-act panels for two weeks. After the storyboards were finished, they were reviewed by Boyer and sent to Amblin for approval. Spielberg rejected several storyboards, demanding rewrites.

Layout work was carried out over a two-week period, during which drawings were synchronized with the vocal performances, while key poses that included up to 40 drawings for some scenes were rendered. During this stage, Boyer revised the storyboards by drawing thumbnail poses to fix missing beats. In some episodes, the episode's director also served as the layout supervisor, overseeing the registration, field size, and backgrounds. Background designer Ted Blackman recreated the visual style of backgrounds from the late 1940s Looney Tunes shorts.

=== Animation ===
With the use of 25,000 cels per episode instead of the standard 10,000 cels, Tiny Toon Adventures was made with a higher production value than standard television animation, allowing for more fluid movements. The animation also included a broader palette of colors than typical television cartoons, as well as fluid camera techniques and more detailed character textures. Budget constraints prevented most of the actual animation from being produced in-house at Warner Bros. Animation, with it instead being contracted out to multiple different domestic and overseas studios including Tokyo Movie Shinsha in Japan, AKOM in South Korea, Kennedy Cartoons in Canada, Wang Film Productions in Taiwan, and StarToons in Chicago with ink-and-paint services provided by an animation studio in Seoul. To maximise control over the end result, key poses were drawn in-house at the layout stage instead of being left to the overseas studios.

To overcome language barriers with overseas studios, director Art Leonardi helped animators understand his intentions by acting out every scene and explaining back lighting and shadow effects on videotape. For two days, a director collected backgrounds, layouts, models, and key poses for shipment, checked exposure sheets against layouts, and delivered them to the overseas studios. The animation—including in-between drawings, cleanup animation, painted cels, and camera shots—took between 14 weeks to four months to finish. In some episodes, scenes were retaken due to issues such as errors in character designs, mistimed actions, wrong colors, or a character speaking another character's dialogue. After examination by Ruegger and the episode's director, an animation checker sent notes to the studio to fix any mistakes.

StarToons provided the main animation for the episode "Henny Youngman Day" and contributed five to six minutes of animation for 18 other episodes. Warner Bros. executives were impressed with Startoons's work. With Ruegger comparing StarToons's character animation to work done by Chuck Jones, StarToons's animation for the episode "Henny Youngman Day" was seen as a parallel to uncommon poses and expressions from Jones's cartoons in the late 1940s and early 1950s. The completed animation was shot at Kinetics Camera Service in Chicago.

=== Music, sound effects, and post-production ===
Tiny Toon Adventures was among the few animated television series at the time that used an original score for each episode. The series' main composer was Bruce Broughton. After an episode's animation was produced, a videotape copy was prepared for Broughton to review an episode with a director or one of its assistants. During the review, they discussed the desired musical mood, instrumentation, and sound effects. Under Broughton's supervision, up to three sessions were recorded using a 27-player orchestra per week, with no synthesizers used and no musical cues recycled from other cartoons.

During post-production, the musical score and sound effects were mixed into each episode, and retakes were substituted for original shots in the print. Technicians completed an episode by cleaning up dirt, removing scratches, and balancing the color of an episode's print on the telecine.

== Promotion and release ==
=== Marketing ===
Tiny Toon Adventures spawned several tie-ins and merchandise items. In September 1990, JCPenney released children's clothing and other merchandise based on the series. In the same month, parties featuring costumed performers portraying Buster Bunny, Babs Bunny, and Dizzy Devil were held at the Pompano Fashion Square, Palm Beach Mall, and Boynton Beach Mall. Also in the same month, Landmark Books released the Tiny Toon Adventures book series, aimed at children aged 2 to 9. In 1991, Quaker Oats Company had a tie-in with the series that featured cut-outs and activities.

=== Broadcast and streaming ===
The series premiered with the episode "The Looney Beginning", which aired as a prime-time television special on CBS on September 14, 1990. Most of the first season was broadcast in first-run syndication across 135 television stations, starting on September 17, 1990. The third and final season of Tiny Toon Adventures was broadcast on Fox starting on September 14, 1992. Two television specials also aired on Fox after the series finale. The first special, "Tiny Toon Spring Break", aired on March 27, 1994; the second special, "Tiny Toons' Night Ghoulery", aired on May 28, 1995. Reruns of the series continued to air on Fox until September 11, 1995.

The series later moved to Nickelodeon and aired reruns from September 24, 1995, to September 1997. In September 1997, it was moved to the Kids' WB programming block. Reruns aired on The Hub Network from July 1, 2013, to June 27, 2015, shortly after the channel was rebranded as Discovery Family on October 14, 2014. The series streamed on Hulu from January 2018 to January 2023.

=== Home video ===
In 1994, Warner Home Video released three volumes of the series on VHS, with each containing two episodes. The first DVD release, Tiny Toon Adventures: Season 1, Volume 1, was released on July 29, 2008. A second DVD set, Tiny Toon Adventures: Season 1, Volume 2, was released on April 21, 2009. Tiny Toon Adventures: Volume 3 was released on January 8, 2013, followed by Tiny Toon Adventures: Volume 4 on May 28, 2013.

== Reception ==
=== Ratings ===
The first episode, "The Looney Beginning", received a 6.9 Nielsen rating (totaling 11.9 million viewers and a 13% share), ranking 72nd on the prime-time television ratings chart for the week of September 10–16, 1990. Throughout its first season, Tiny Toon Adventures ranked as the third highest-rated television show during the first four weeks of the 1990–91 television season, became the highest-rated afternoon program in November 1990 and February 1991, replaced TaleSpin as the highest-rated syndicated children's program, and surpassed the ratings of Teenage Mutant Ninja Turtles, DuckTales, and TaleSpin to become the highest-rated children's afternoon program. By November 1990, the series averaged a 37% audience share among children and a 24% share among teenagers.

During its third season, the show increased its ratings on Fox's programming block Fox Kids, tying at number five with The Addams Family on the chart of the most successful Saturday morning television series during the 1992–93 television season. In its first three weeks, the series ranked as the highest-rated television program among children aged six to eleven, earning a 7.1 Nielsen rating, and the second highest-rated program among teens (behind Batman: The Animated Series), earning a 4.4 Nielsen rating. The series finale, "It's a Wonderful Tiny Toons Christmas Special", received a 6.2 Nielsen rating, ranking 90th on the Nielsen Ratings chart for the week of November 30 to December 6, 1992.

After the series ended, it continued to receive high ratings in reruns. In 1993, Tiny Toon Adventures was viewed by 1.4 million children on Fox and consistently ranked near the top of the Nielsen charts for children aged two to eleven. By December, it ranked among the top five highest-rated weekday afternoon programs. In 1994, the series was placed within the top five highest-rated television shows for children aged two to eleven. On the Nielsen Ratings chart for the week ending on March 27, 1994, the special "Tiny Toon Spring Break" received a 4.3 Nielsen rating (totaling 7.7 million viewers), tying at 84th place with Sinbad Special 1 on the chart.

=== Critical response ===
Tiny Toon Adventures received generally positive reviews from critics. Most reviewers, such as television critic Jon Burlingame, Noel Holston of the Minnesota Star Tribune, and Bill Mann of the Oakland Tribune, praised its animation. Janice Kennedy of The Vancouver Sun called the series a "lovingly-crafted piece of artistry", deeming it "superior to most of the material churned by today's animators." Times Colonist's Rick Forchuk lauded the characters as "beautifully drawn", while Steve McKerrow of The Evening Sun wrote that the series "looks as good or better than the old, pre-feature movie shorts." In a less complimentary review, animation historian Charles Solomon of The Los Angeles Times was critical of the animation and its originality, disliking what he described as "dull" explosions and expressions as well as Art Vitello's timing.

Several critics highlighted the techniques used in the series. Holston focused on its cinematic techniques, such as "mixing long shots, extra-tight closeups, and odd perspectives." Kennedy called attention to the show's contrast with previous Warner Bros. shorts and their techniques, such as the higher number of animated frames per minute, the use of live orchestration, and the application of the "wisdom of old masters." Television critic Chip Sudderth lauded the show's appeal to both adults and children, while Holston compared its appeal to adults to that of TaleSpin.

Some aspects received mixed reviews. Sudderth praised the voice acting as "expressive and distinctive", whereas Mann criticized Plucky Duck's voice, deeming it "a bit disconcerting" and "a bad version of Mel Blanc ['s] [Daffy Duck]." While Forchuk praised the writing as "more interesting and complex", Sudderth regarded the thirty-minute stories as inferior to episodes structured around three shorts. Ranking the series as the "best afternoon [cartoon] show", Thelma Scumm of Animato! nonetheless was critical of the show's quality, satire, and repetitive focus on morals. In contrast, Alanna Mitchell of The Globe and Mail ranked it as the worst children's television show. In January 2009, IGN ranked Tiny Toon Adventures 41st in their Top 100 Animated TV Shows list.

=== Awards and nominations ===
| Award | Date of ceremony | Category | Recipient(s) | Result | Ref. |
|---|---|---|---|---|---|
| Annie Awards | November 14, 1992 | Best Animated Television Program | Amblin Entertainment and Warner Bros. Television | Nominated | |
| Annie Awards | November 5, 1993 | Best Animated Television Program | Warner Bros. Animation | Nominated | |
| Daytime Emmy Awards | June 27, 1991 (main ceremony) | Outstanding Animated Program | Steven Spielberg, Tom Ruegger, Ken Boyer, Art Leonardi, Art Vitello, Paul Dini, and Sherri Stoner | Won | |
| Daytime Emmy Awards | June 27, 1991 (main ceremony) | Outstanding Music Direction and Composition | William Ross for "Fields of Honey" | Won | |
| Daytime Emmy Awards | June 27, 1991 (main ceremony) | Outstanding Original Song | Bruce Broughton, Wayne Kaatz, and Tom Ruegger for the "Main Title Theme" | Won | |
| Daytime Emmy Awards | June 23, 1992 (main ceremony) | Outstanding Animated Program | Steven Spielberg, Tom Ruegger, Sherri Stoner, Rich Arons, and Art Leonardi | Nominated | |
| Daytime Emmy Awards | June 23, 1992 (main ceremony) | Outstanding Music Direction and Composition | Mark Watters for "The Love Disconnection" | Won | |
| Daytime Emmy Awards | June 23, 1992 (main ceremony) | Outstanding Writing in an Animated Program | Nicholas Hollander, Tom Ruegger, Paul Dini, and Sherri Stoner | Won | |
| Daytime Emmy Awards | May 22, 1993 (Daytime Creative Arts Emmy Awards); May 26, 1993 (main ceremony) | Outstanding Children's Animated Program | Steven Spielberg, Tom Ruegger, Sherri Stoner, Rich Arons, Bryon Vaughns, Ken Boyer, Alfred Gimeno, and David West | Won | |
| Daytime Emmy Awards | May 22, 1993 (Daytime Creative Arts Emmy Awards); May 26, 1993 (main ceremony) | Outstanding Music Direction and Composition | Steven Bramson for "The Horror of Slumber Party Mountain" | Won | |
| Environmental Media Awards | September 30, 1991 | Children's Television Program – Animated | For the episode "Whale Tales" | Won | |
| Primetime Emmy Awards | 1991 (Primetime Creative Arts Emmy Awards) | Outstanding Animated Program | Steven Spielberg, Tom Ruegger, Paul Dini, Sherri Stoner, Dave Marshall, Glen Kennedy, and Rich Aarons for the episode "The Looney Beginning" | Nominated | |
| Primetime Emmy Awards | 1995 (Primetime Creative Arts Emmy Awards) | Outstanding Animated Program | Steven Spielberg, Tom Ruegger, Michael Gerard, Peter Hastings, Rich Arons, Rusty Mills, Greg Reyna, Paul Dini, and Paul Rugg for the special "Tiny Toons' Night Ghoulery" | Nominated | |
| Young Artist Awards | 1990 or 1991 | Best New Cartoon Series | Tiny Toon Adventures | Won | |
| Young Artist Awards | January 16, 1993 | Outstanding Young Voice-Over in an Animated Series or Special | Whit Hertford | Nominated | |

== 1991 stolen background artwork and cels incident ==
On October 28, 1991, a Warner Bros. employee discovered that background artwork and cels of the characters from the series had been sold at a flea market in Orange County, California, without the studio's authorization. As only 250 cels had been officially released for sale at a studio store, the employee notified his supervisors about the incident. Warner Bros. privately investigated the incident without involving the police.

Warner Bros. identified five individuals who stole the cels, including three suspects who sold the material at flea markets in Orange County, San Diego County, and Las Vegas. According to court records, privately filmed videotapes proved that suspects Travis Cowsill and Nicolette Harley had separately met private investigator Kevin Berman to sell cels from the series. Cowsill stated that he stole materials while working as a freelance animator after finding out that some boxes were marked for disposal. Warner Bros. disputed this claim, stating that they were not meant for disposal and were to be kept indefinitely.

Warner Bros. filed five lawsuits against the defendants for copyright infringement. Three of the civil suits were settled after the defendants had their cels seized in their apartments by a court raid and agreed to cooperate with the investigation, leaving the remaining two civil suits pending. On December 26, 1991, Warner Bros. announced that it had recovered more than 3,000 pieces of background artwork and cels from the series valued at over $500,000. Three cels remained missing and were believed to have been sold by collectors.

== Franchise ==
=== Film ===
Originally planned as a theatrical release by Warner Bros. Pictures, the feature-length film Tiny Toon Adventures: How I Spent My Vacation was released direct-to-video on March 11, 1992, on VHS and Laserdisc. It was later re-edited and broadcast as part of the television series, airing on September 5, 1993, on Fox Kids. It was released on DVD on August 21, 2012.

=== Video games ===
Since the series's debut, numerous video games based on Tiny Toon Adventures have been released. Konami released Tiny Toon Adventures in 1991 for the Nintendo Entertainment System and Tiny Toon Adventures: Buster's Hidden Treasure in March 1993 in North America for the Sega Genesis. Terraglyph Interactive Studios released Tiny Toon Adventures: Buster and the Beanstalk in 1996 on CD-ROM. Tiny Toon Adventures: Defenders of the Universe was scheduled to be released in mid-2002 by Treasure for the PlayStation 2 and GameCube, but was canceled for unknown reasons.

=== Spin-offs ===
The first spin-off series, The Plucky Duck Show, premiered on September 19, 1992, on the Fox Kids programming block. The second spin-off series Pinky, Elmyra & the Brain premiered on September 19, 1998, on the Kids' WB programming block.

=== Reboot ===
A reboot series titled Tiny Toons Looniversity was announced on October 28, 2020, through the Amblin Entertainment website, with an initial order of two seasons. Steven Spielberg returned as executive producer, continuing his role from the original series. Sam Register, Darryl Frank, and Justin Falvey also served as executive producers, while Erin Gibson served as the showrunner and co-executive producer. The series premiered on HBO Max on September 8, 2023, and on Cartoon Network the next day.

== Sources ==
=== Books ===
- Dini, Paul; Kidd, Chip (1998). "Dark By Design: Batman's Backgrounds". Batman Animated. Harper Entertainment. p. 47. ISBN 0-06-757531-5 – via Internet Archive.
- Goldmark, Daniel (June 2, 2000). "An Interview with Richard Stone, Steve Bernstein, and Julie Bernstein". In Goldmark, Daniel; Taylor, Yuval (eds.). The Cartoon Music Book. A Cappella. p. 230. ISBN 1-55652-473-0 – via Internet Archive.
- Lawson, Tim; Persons, Alisa (2004). "Maurice LaMarche". The Magic Behind the Voices: A Who's Who of Cartoon Voice Actors. University Press of Mississippi. p. 208. ISBN 1-57806-695-6 – via Internet Archive.
- Lenburg, Jeff (2008). "Tiny Toon Adventures: How I Spent My Vacation". The Encyclopedia of Animated Cartoons. Vol. 1 (3 ed.). Checkmark Books. p. 399. ISBN 978-0-8160-6600-1.

=== Magazine articles ===
- Millerb, Bob (October 1990). "New Toons on the Block: They're attending Acme Looniversity & hoping to graduate as classic cartoon characters". Comics Scene. No. 15. Starlog Group. pp. 33–39. Archived from the original on April 22, 2025.
- Millerc, Bob (December 1990). "Fine Tooning: After battling Bart Simpson, Kent Butterworth helps raise Bug Bunny's heirs". Comics Scene. No. 16. Starlog Group. pp. 27, 65 – via Internet Archive.
- Millerd, Bob (February 1991). "Tiny Toon Adventures Directing: Four animated guys offer looney lessons at Acme University". Comics Scene. No. 17. Starlog Group. pp. 33, 36–37 – via Internet Archive.
- Millere, Bob (June 1991). "Directions through Acme Acres: The directorial team tours the Tiny Toons' team". Comics Scene. No. 19. Starlog Group. pp. 45–48, 52 – via Internet Archive.
