= Tiny Toon Adventures: How I Spent My Vacation =

1992 American animated film

- LaserDisc release cover
- Directed by: Rich Arons; Ken Boyer; Kent Butterworth; Barry Caldwell; Alfred Gimeno; Art Leonardi; Byron Vaughns
- Written by: Paul Dini; Nicholas Hollander; Tom Ruegger; Sherri Stoner
- Based on: Tiny Toon Adventures by Tom Ruegger
- Produced by: Tom Ruegger
- Starring: Charlie Adler; Joe Alaskey; Tress MacNeille; Don Messick; Rob Paulsen; Cree Summer; Jonathan Winters; Edie McClurg; Gail Matthius; Kath Soucie; Frank Welker; Sorrell Booke
- Music by: Steven Bramson; Bruce Broughton; Don Davis; Albert Lloyd Olson; Richard Stone; Stephen James Taylor; Mark Watters
- Production companies: Warner Bros. Animation; Amblin Entertainment; Warner Bros. Domestic Television Distribution
- Distributed by: Warner Home Video
- Release date: March 11, 1992
- Running time: 80 minutes
- Country: United States
- Language: English
- Budget: $700,000

Tiny Toon Adventures: How I Spent My Vacation is a 1992 American animated comedy film from Warner Bros. Animation and Amblin Entertainment, originally intended for theatrical exhibition by Warner Bros. Pictures. Featuring the regular characters from the Fox Kids animated television program Tiny Toon Adventures, It follows the Tiny Toons on their summer vacation from school, mainly focused on Babs and Buster going downriver, Plucky and Hamton going to a world-famous amusement park, and Fifi in search of her favorite movie star.

The film takes place between the show's second and third seasons, Steven Spielberg served as executive producer, with writing by Paul Dini, Nicholas Hollander, Tom Ruegger and Sherri Stoner. Japanese animation studio Tokyo Movie Shinsha (now known as TMS Entertainment) produced the animation. How I Spent My Vacation was released on both VHS and LaserDisc formats on Wednesday, March 11, 1992. It was the first feature-length animated film to be released direct-to-video in the United States. The film was later aired on television as four separate Tiny Toon Adventures episodes.

It was one of the highest-selling videos in the United States, listing on Billboard magazine's 40 "Top Video Sales" for 16 weeks as of July 1992. Points of praise by critics included the humor and celebrity caricatures, while criticism included the segmented plot. Themes include parodies of pop culture and summer vacations.

== Plot ==
The Tiny Toon Adventures characters excitedly prepare for their summer vacations after their term at Acme Looniversity ends. Babs and Buster Bunny have a water pistol fight, which eventually escalates into flooding Acme Acres. The bunnies, along with Byron Basset, float from flooded Acme Acres down to the Southern United States, where they continuously try to avoid getting eaten by the river's residents.

Plucky Duck joins Hamton J. Pig and Hamton's family as they drive to the amusement park HappyWorldLand. The trip turns out to be very long and painfully boring for Plucky, who becomes annoyed with the family's habits and is almost killed by an escaped convict that the Pigs mistake for a hitchhiker. Upon arrival at HappyWorldLand, the family rides the tour monorail around the park and then decide to head home, much to Plucky's dismay.

Meanwhile, Elmyra Duff, upset after losing her cat Furrball, visits a nature park with her family, where she terrorizes the wild animals with her adoration. Fifi La Fume, lovestruck by teen heartthrob Johnny Pew, becomes his put-upon "assistant", unaware that he is uninterested in her. Fowlmouth and Shirley the Loon see Skunknophobia, and Fifi and Johnny attend the same film. Fowlmouth disrupts throughout and is thrown out of the theater. Fifi, enraged when Johnny takes her photograph of him and signs it for a Bimbette, physically ejects Johnny from the theater, causing him to end up with Elmyra and mistakenly becomes her new "kitty".

After realizing that they are the main course at a dinner theater on a showboat, Babs and Buster escape, with Byron's help. They are sought after by the hungry animals from their journey, but are rescued by a possum named Banjo, whom Buster had befriended earlier. The convict returns and tries to kill them; Buster, Babs, Byron and Banjo try to escape using a mine cart and the convict falls off a cliff. The quartet fall down a "plot hole", which leads them through Wackyland and back to Acme Acres. The characters return to the Looniversity for the fall semester.

== Voice cast ==
Name	Character
Charlie Adler	Buster Bunny, Theater Usher
Tress MacNeille	Babs Bunny, Babs' Mother, Big Boo, Emily Duff, Roseanne Barr, Barbara Walters, Hotel Chef, Drive-thru Waitress, Horatio's Girlfriend
Gail Matthius	Shirley the Loon and Sissy Boo
Kath Soucie	Fifi La Fume, Li'l Sneezer, Little Boo and Bimbette
Don Messick	Hamton J. Pig, Radio Announcer
Joe Alaskey	Plucky Duck, Tupelo Toad, Johnny Carson, David Letterman and Elmer Fudd
Maurice LaMarche	Dizzy Devil, Ed McMahon, and Arsenio Hall
Frank Welker	Gogo, Furrball, Byron Basset, Uncle Stinky, Vinnie, and various additional voices
Rob Paulsen	Fowlmouth, Johnny Pew, Mr. Hitcher, Banjo Possum, Hotel Manager, Horatio and the Parking Lot Attendant
Cree Summer	Elmyra Duff, Mary Melody and Oprah Winfrey
Candi Milo	Sweetie Pie
Jonathan Winters	Wade Pig and Superman
Edie McClurg	Winnie Pig
Sorrell Booke	Big Daddy Boo
Paul Julian	Road Runner (archive recordings)

== Production ==
In 1990, Bugs Bunny magazine reported that Warner Bros. was planning the release of How I Spent My Vacation, then referred to as a "Tiny Toon Adventures home video". Plans began before Tiny Toon Adventures premiered on television. Warner Bros. discussed with executive producer Steven Spielberg whether the film should be released in theaters, but Spielberg insisted on a direct-to-video release. Spielberg said that they wanted to make the film a direct-to-video release because "animated features are ideally suited for the repeat viewing," a factor that he found important to the genre's appeal to those watching animated films at home. In an interview for the Los Angeles Times, executive in charge of production Jean MacCurdy did not specify the budget of the film, but stated that it was far more costly than episodes of Tiny Toon Adventures. According to Hal Erickson's Television Cartoon Shows: an Illustrated Encyclopedia, the budget of the average Tiny Toon Adventures episode was approximately $350,000.

How I Spent My Vacation was written by series regulars Paul Dini, Nicholas Hollander, Tom Ruegger and Sherri Stoner. Ruegger also served as a producer, and Steven Spielberg as executive producer. The film was animated by Tokyo Movie Shinsha, a Japanese studio. The film had eight directors: Rich Aarons, Ken Boyer, Kent Butterworth, Barry Caldwell, Alfred Gimeno, Arthur Leonardi, Byron Vaughns, and Hiroshi Aoyama.

== Songs ==
All tracks are written by Bruce Broughton.

No.	Title	Performer(s)	Length
1.	"Tiny Toon Adventures Theme Song"	Instrumental
2.	"Waiting for the Clock / Tiny Toon Adventures Vacation Main Title Theme"	Charlie Adler, Tress MacNeille, Joe Alaskey, Don Messick, Kath Soucie & Cast
3.	"Beneath the Ocean"	Chorus
4.	"Happy World Land Anthem"	Chorus
5.	"Tiny Toon Adventures Vacation End Title Theme"	Charlie Adler, Tress MacNeille, Joe Alaskey, Don Messick, Kath Soucie & Cast

== Themes ==
One of the main hallmarks of How I Spent My Vacation was the parody of film, popular culture and celebrities. Videos for Kids noted that the film makes fun of "California culture and youth" with the use of celebrity caricatures, such as those of Roseanne Barr, Johnny Carson, Arsenio Hall, David Letterman, Jay Leno, Oprah Winfrey and Sylvester Stallone. The film makes fun of other cartoon characters, such as those of Superman, The Simpsons, Teenage Mutant Ninja Turtles, Who Framed Roger Rabbit, The Ren & Stimpy Show, Beavis and Butt-Head and The Little Mermaid. Babs and Buster's travels down the river are a parody of the film Deliverance.

Jean MacCurdy said that How I Spent My Vacation makes fun of summer vacations by mocking "the boredom of summer and some of those horrible car trips" (an issue that was first explored in National Lampoon's Vacation). In the film, Hamton's family's car trip is very taxing for Plucky Duck; he is disgusted by the family and is nearly killed by an escaped lunatic that the family mistakes for a hitchhiker (he happens to be a caricature of Jason Voorhees). The film's fictional theme park, "HappyWorldLand", is a spoof of Disneyland.

== Home media releases and broadcast ==
Prior to its release, How I Spent My Vacation was given a matinee screening in June 1991 at Skokie's Old Orchard Theatre. It was released direct-to-video on March 11, 1992.^{[a]} The film was released on VHS and LaserDisc formats. MacCurdy said that the film was released at that time to take advantage of the Easter market. Because retailers had high demand for the film, Warner Bros. shipped to them nearly one million copies, which the Los Angeles Times noted as "a record for direct-to-video programs".

How I Spent My Vacation was the first feature-length animated film made for the direct-to-video market released in the United States.^{[b]} At the time, the concept of a direct-to-video animated feature was so strange to consumers that some mistakenly thought How I Spent My Vacation was a collection of Tiny Toon Adventures episodes.

The film later aired on Fox Kids on September 5, 1993, as four Tiny Toon Adventures episodes, episodes 97 through 100. Warner Home Video began to release the Tiny Toon Adventures series on DVD, in volumes, on July 29, 2008. The company released How I Spent My Vacation for the first time on DVD on August 21, 2012. The Hub, which aired Tiny Toon Adventures, showed the film as well.

== Reception ==
The film received mixed-to-positive reviews from critics. Giving three out of four bones, the VideoHound's Golden Movie Retriever highlighted the parodies in the film, and noted that "Parents will be [as] equally entertained [as children] by the level of humor and fast-paced action". Film critic Leonard Maltin gave the film two and a half stars out of four, saying the film was "[e]pisodic", but praised the voice cast, songs and "funny business". TV Guide called the film a "firecracker", citing the film's many jokes. The book Videos for Kids: The Essential, Indispensable Parent's Guide to Children's Movies on Video praised the "tongue-in-cheek humor" and celebrity caricatures but issued warning to parents, stating that the film may not be appropriate for "children too young to identify satire" because the characters in the film "are rude and combative" and may not be positive role models. Videos for Kids still concluded that the film "should provide an enjoyable viewing experience for the whole family". Dennis Hunt of the Los Angeles Times said that the format of a direct-video film was "unusual", but that some parts of the film were "hilarious", especially the scenes which make fun of Walt Disney World. Since its release, How I Spent My Vacation has been rated as one of the "Top 20 (U.S.-Produced) Direct-to-Video Animated Films" by The Animated Movie Guide.

Rating the film a "C+" overall, Steve Daly of Entertainment Weekly noted that while the film was "superior to most TV fare", he called the film a "pandering kidvid make-over" of the Looney Tunes cartoons on which Tiny Toons was based, saying the characters were immature and the content was "fast without being funny". A 1992 issue of the Video Watchdog was particularly critical, calling the film "a mixed bag" that "sacrificed (...) a cohesive plot for an outline that allows various teams of characters to come up with four stories." The magazine also questioned the point of using characters heavily based on the classic Looney Tunes characters instead of using the classic characters themselves.

The VHS release was one of the highest selling videos in the United states; on the Billboard charts, the video ranked 12th in sales in April 1992. In May 1992, How I Spent My Vacation rose to 9th in video sales. On July 18, 1992, How I Spent My Vacation had been on Billboard Magazine's 40 "Top Video Sales" for 16 weeks. On June 27, 1992, the film was ranked the 5th highest on Billboard's "Top Kid Video". On February 6, 1993, How I Spent My Vacation had been on the "Top Kid Video" list for 41 weeks. While it did not state the revenue of the film, the Toronto Star stated that the film sold so well that Warner Bros. decided to release videos of Tiny Toon Adventures episodes.
