= C. Lee Tocci =

American novelist

C. Lee Tocci is the pen name for Cynthia Tocci. Born in Boston, Massachusetts, Cynthia Tocci is the author of the young adult fantasy series, The Chronicles of Kiva. She is also a screenwriter, film producer, theatrical producer, actress, and accountant.

== Biography ==
Tocci is the fifth of eight children born to Valentino Tocci and Ruth Carnes Tocci. She was born in Massachusetts and raised in Lexington, Massachusetts. After attending Northeastern University for one year, she transferred to University of New Hampshire, where she received a bachelor's degree in Hotel Administration.

In the 1980s, she began studying acting and appeared in countless theatrical productions throughout New England. She originated the role of Vincenza Vermicelli, the pregnant bridesmaid, in the interactive theatrical production of Joey and Maria's Comedy Italian Wedding.

In 1994, she purchased a function hall in Woburn, Massachusetts at a federal auction and opened the Deco Boston Dinner Theater. From 1994 through 1998, she produced over sixty theatrical productions, including two interactive shows that she wrote herself: Polyester High 20th High School Reunion and The Wake of Maddy O'Malley. She also ran children's theater workshops.

Tocci sold the business in 1999 and relocated to Los Angeles to pursue acting and film production. In 2000 she wrote and produced the independent murder mystery romance film Title to Murder, starring Maureen McCormick and Christopher Atkins. During production, Tocci was involved in a set accident when a large portable generator rolled and crushed her hand, leaving her in the hospital for several key days of shooting. The middle finger on her left hand is still damaged.

The film did not achieve the financial success that she'd hoped for. Disappointed with the creative constraints of filmmaking, she began writing novels. She once said, "In a novel, no one tells you we don't have the budget to blow up a four-story building. Heck, blow up a twelve-story building instead! It's only two more letters!"

Her debut novel, Stone Voice Rising, the first in the series: The Chronicles of Kiva, was published in 2009 under the pen name C. Lee Tocci.

== Stone Voice Rising ==
Stone Voice Rising is the first book of a six-volume young adult fantasy series. The story revolves around Lilibit, a young girl destined to become the Stone Voice, the one human who can communicate directly with the soul of the Earth, and Todd, a boy who will rise to be a mighty Stone Warrior. Evil forces, led by the demonic Deceiver Syxx, work to destroy Lilibit before she can achieve her destiny. Under the working title The Road to Kiva, the book won the Editor's Choice Award at the San Diego State University Writers' Conference in January 2006.

== Awards ==
- San Diego State University 2006 Writers Conference Editors Choice Award.
