= Pinky, Elmyra & the Brain =

American animated television series

- Also known as: Steven Spielberg Presents Pinky, Elmyra & the Brain
- Genre: Science fiction comedy
- Created by: Tom Ruegger
- Based on: Pinky and the Brain and Tiny Toon Adventures by Tom Ruegger
- Developed by: Rusty Mills
- Starring: Maurice LaMarche; Rob Paulsen; Cree Summer
- Composers: Richard Stone; Harvey R. Cohen; Steve Bernstein; Julie Bernstein
- Country of origin: United States
- Original language: English
- No. of seasons: 1
- No. of episodes: 13

Production
- Executive producer: Steven Spielberg
- Producers: Liz Holzman; Charles M. Howell IV; John P. McCann
- Running time: 11 minutes (22 minutes in "Teleport a Friend")
- Production companies: Amblin Entertainment; Warner Bros. Television Animation (Note: Animation outsourced to Rough Draft Studios and Wang Film Productions.)

Original release
- Network: Kids' WB
- Release: September 19, 1998 – April 10, 1999

Related
- Tiny Toon Adventures; Pinky and the Brain; The Plucky Duck Show; Animaniacs; Animaniacs (2020 TV series)

Pinky, Elmyra & the Brain is an American animated television series featuring characters from the television series Tiny Toon Adventures and Pinky and the Brain, both created by Tom Ruegger. Serving as a spin-off and crossover to the two series, the series was executive produced by Steven Spielberg and produced by Warner Bros. Television Animation and Amblin Entertainment. It aired from 1998 to 1999 on Kids' WB, running for 13 episodes. This show would be Spielberg's final collaborative effort with Warner Bros. Animation until the 2020 revival of Animaniacs.

== Premise ==
The series starts with ACME Labs destroyed and subsequently converted into a Dissy Store (a parody of Disney Store), leaving Pinky (Rob Paulsen) and the Brain (Maurice LaMarche) homeless and on the run from a man named Wally Faust. Pinky and the Brain finally end up in a pet shop in Shanghai and take refuge inside a turtle; they are still inside the turtle when it is purchased by Elmyra Duff (Cree Summer) and named Mr. Shellbutt. In their new home, Pinky and the Brain continue to attempt new methods of trying to take over the world while at the same time enduring, and later accepting and adjusting to, Elmyra's affection.

== New characters ==
- Wally Faust (voiced by Jeff Bennett)
- Rudy Mookich (voiced by Nancy Cartwright)
- Vanity White (voiced by Jane Wiedlin)
- Andrew Loam (voiced by Pamela Segall)
- Ms. Entebbe (voiced by Andrea Martin)
- Principal Cheevers (voiced by John Vernon)
- Shad Equipo (voiced by David Paymer)
- Mr. Pussy Wussy (voiced by Frank Welker)
- Dr. Glen Tarantella (voiced by Fred Willard)
- Lloyd Oldtire (voiced by Ed Begley, Jr.)
- Rockin' John (voiced by Ben Stein)
- Claude Gristle (voiced by Townsend Coleman)
- Nurse Gland (voiced by T'Keyah Crystal Keymáh)
- Ziff Twyman (voiced by Jack Carter)
- Taylor Tyler, Hoovie, and Billy (voiced by Jason Marsden)
- Clarence (voiced by Julianne Beuscher)
- Chorus members (voiced by Steve Bernstein and Bob Joyce)

== Development ==
Warner Bros. network executives had reportedly wanted Pinky and the Brain to be part of a sitcom "more like The Simpsons". In a press release, Warner Bros. stated that the new series was "a fresh approach to popular favorites as Pinky & The Brain move from ACME Labs to America's suburbs when they are adopted by the extremely excitable Elmyra". The idea was reportedly met with resistance from the producers of the series.

The apparent dissatisfaction with Warner Bros.' decision to change Pinky and the Brain showed up in episodes of that show. The last script that producer Peter Hastings wrote before leaving Warner Bros. for Disney Television Animation was the episode "You'll Never Eat Food Pellets in This Town Again!", in which the demise of Pinky and the Brain is caused by network decisions to change the show.

The theme song for Pinky, Elmyra & the Brain included the lyric: "So Pinky and the Brain share a new domain. It's what the network wants, why bother to complain?" The lyric is accompanied by a shot in which Pinky and the Brain get kicked out of the Warner Bros. office. In addition, a spoken line by the Brain towards the end of the theme song states: "I deeply resent this".

== Nominations and awards ==
Pinky, Elmyra & the Brain won an Annie Award in 1999, for "Outstanding Individual Achievement for Voice Acting in an Animated Television Production." Both Rob Paulsen for his voicing of Pinky and Cree Summer for her voicing of Elmyra were nominated in the category, with Paulsen winning the award. That same year Pinky, Elmyra & the Brain was nominated for another Annie Award, "Outstanding Individual Achievement for Directing in an Animated Television Production."

Also in 1999, Pinky, Elmyra & the Brain was nominated for a Daytime Emmy Award, for "Outstanding Children's Animated Program", which it lost to PBS Kids show Arthur. The next year in 2000, the show was nominated again for the award and won.

== Voices ==
- Rob Paulsen as Pinky
- Cree Summer as Elmyra Duff
- Maurice LaMarche as the Brain

=== Additional voices ===
- Ed Begley Jr. – Lloyd Oldtire
- Jeff Bennett – Baloney the Dinosaur, Jimmy, Wally Faust, Roberto, Baloney
- Julie Bernstein – Janson Singer, Singer
- Steve Bernstein – Chorus Member, Singer
- Julianne Buescher – Clarence
- Charlotte Caffey – Way Cool #1
- Jack Carter – Ziff Twyman
- Nancy Cartwright – Rudy Mookich
- Larry Cedar – Salesman
- Jim Cummings – Manager
- Tim Curry – Monkman
- Blake Ewing – Janson Singer
- Lisa Jenio – Way Cool #2
- Bob Joyce – Chorus Member, Singer
- T'Keyah Crystal Keymah – Nurse Gland
- Tress MacNeille – Marie Maria, Jackie, Gloria Allgreen, French Woman
- Jason Marsden – Taylor Tyler Hoovie
- Andrea Martin – Ms. Entebbe
- Gail Matthius – American Tourist
- Michael McKean – Grocer
- Pat Musick – Old Woman, Weasel
- Bobbi Page – Singer
- David Paymer – Shad Equipo
- Pamela Segall – Andrew Loam
- Yeardley Smith – Gert
- Ben Stein – Johnny Hot
- Ashley Tisdale – Janson Singer
- John Vernon – Principal Cheevers
- Janet Waldo – Old Lady
- Frank Welker – Parrot, Pussy Wussy, Tunk, Penny
- Jane Wiedlin – Vanity White
- Fred Willard – Dr. Glen Tarantella

== Media information ==
=== Broadcast history ===
The series's initial run was from 1998 to 1999 with a total of six episodes. The rest of the episodes were split up into segments as part of The Cat&Birdy Warneroonie PinkyBrainy Big Cartoonie Show along with segments from other Warner Bros. cartoons. The show's inclusion in The Big Cartoonie Show lasted from January to September 1999. In the United Kingdom, the series was fully broadcast on CITV during 2001. In Canada, it aired on YTV.

On January 4, 2018, Hulu acquired the streaming rights to Pinky, Elmyra & the Brain along with Pinky and the Brain, Animaniacs, and Tiny Toon Adventures. The series was removed in 2023.

=== Episode lengths ===
Many Pinky, Elmyra & the Brain episodes had been split into two parts and aired at different times. The split sections of these episodes were 10 to 11 minutes long, versus the standard 22 minutes for most animated cartoon series.

=== Home video ===
A two-disc complete series DVD set of the show was released by Warner Home Video on January 28, 2014.

=== Toys ===
Carl's Jr. and Hardee's offered a collection of four Pinky, Elmyra & the Brain toys with their kids' meals.

== Episodes ==
Part	Episodes	Segments	Originally released	
Part	Episodes	Segments	First released	Last released
Pinky, Elmyra & the Brain	6	12	September 19, 1998	December 12, 1998
The Cat&Birdy Warneroonie PinkyBrainy Big Cartoonie Show	7	13	January 16, 1999	April 10, 1999

=== Pinky, Elmyra & the Brain ===
No.	Title	Directed by	Written by	Original release date
1a	"Patty Ann"	Nelson Recinos	John P. McCann	September 19, 1998
Using his mechanical human suit (now with girls' clothing on it), the Brain poses as Patty Ann, Elmyra's cousin. Despite his unconvincing appearance, Elmyra's crush, Rudy Mookich, falls head over heels for him.
1b	"Gee, Your Hair Spells Terrific"	Nelson Recinos	Tom Ruegger and Charles Howell	September 19, 1998
Brain plans to clone dinosaurs from fossilized amber mosquitoes and use them in his latest plan to take over the world. To get the money to do this, he will have to somehow get Elmyra to win a spelling bee, but the only way to make that work is to help her cheat.
2a	"Cute Little Alienhead"	Russell Calabrese	Kate Donahue and Scott Kreamer	September 26, 1998
Using an intergalactic radio, the Brain manages to flag down a passing alien in hopes of trading for advanced weapons to use in his latest plan to take over the world. The alien is driven away by an annoying Elmyra, who happens to be the first human that he comes into contact with.
2b	"Better Living... Through Cheese"	Russell Calabrese	Wendell Morris and Tom Sheppard	September 26, 1998
The Brain needs the prize money from a science fair to fund his latest plan to take over the world and builds a high-tech device for Elmyra to show off. Rudy, however, decides to get a cheap laugh and destroys the device right before it can be judged by Bob Quack the Science Hack.
3a	"My Fair Brainy!"	Nelson Recinos	Doug Langdale	October 3, 1998
In a parody of My Fair Lady, the Brain devises a plan to take over the world from outer space through Elmyra, who has entered a contest in order to become the first child aboard the Space Shuttle.
3b	"The Cat Who Cried Woof!"	Nelson Recinos	Wendell Morris and Tom Sheppard	October 3, 1998
The Brain creates a formula that makes Mr. Pussy-Wussy, Elmyra's pet cat, think that he is a dog.
4a	"The Girl with Nothing Extra"	Russell Calabrese and Rob Davies	Gordon Bressack and Charles Howell	November 7, 1998
The Brain tries to make Elmyra popular so that he and Pinky can work through her fame in order to take over the world.
4b	"Narfily Ever After"	Russell Calabrese and Rob Davies	Gordon Bressack and Charles Howell	November 7, 1998
The Brain tells Elmyra a bedtime story that closely follows the plot of Cinderella.
5a	"The Icky Mouse Club"	Nelson Recinos	Wendell Morris and Tom Sheppard	November 21, 1998
The Brain decides that he should organize the neighborhood kids into a gang, and when they grow up they will still see him as their leader.
5b	"The Man from W.A.S.H.I.N.G.T.O.N."	Nelson Recinos	John P. McCann	November 21, 1998
Wally Faust (who is introduced in this episode and then is never seen again), an agent for a secret clandestine organization within the U.S. government, tries to steal the Brain's latest invention for world domination and kill both him and Pinky, just because the two of them have almost succeeded in taking over the world more times than the organization has.
6a	"Yule Be Sorry"	Nelson Recinos	John P. McCann	December 12, 1998
Christmas episode. After the Brain gets angry at Pinky and wishes that Pinky was never his friend, he has a dream that shows him what things would really be like if they were in Acme Labs with Elmyra instead.
6b	"How I Spent My Weekend"	Nelson Recinos	Charles Howell, Wendell Morris, and Tom Sheppard	December 12, 1998
Elmyra narrates the story of the Brain's plan to build a giant robot that will fly to France and shoot out laser beams that will turn all the cheese into stupid American tourists.

=== The Cat&Birdy Warneroonie PinkyBrainy Big Cartoonie Show ===
Less than halfway through the series' run, Pinky, Elmyra and the Brain began airing on The Cat&Birdy Warneroonie PinkyBrainy Big Cartoonie Show, in which one episode segment was shown at a time, rather than complete episodes. The exception to this airing change was episode 10, which was shown completely intact on its respective air date.

No.	Title	Directed by	Written by	Original release date
7a	"At the Hop"	Rob Davies	John P. McCann	January 16, 1999
Elmyra wants to go to the school dance with Rudy, but Rudy actually wants to go with Patty Ann, which is actually Brain in disguise. This suits the Brain just fine, because he needs to get back his cologne that makes people instantly attractive so that he can use it in his latest plan to take over the world. Note: This cartoon introduces Vanity White.
7b	"Pinky's Dream House"	Rob Davies	Gordon Bressack	January 23, 1999
When Pinky dreams of living a normal family life, Elmyra dresses up both him and the Brain in doll's clothing and places them in a doll house.
8a	"The Ravin!"	Nelson Recinos	Wendell Morris and Tom Sheppard	January 30, 1999
The Brain reads an altered version of the Edgar Allan Poe poem "The Raven". Note: This episode shows what happened to Acme Labs, in which the laboratory was changed into a Dissy Store (a parody of the Disney Store).
8b	"Elmyra's Music Video"	Unknown	Unknown	February 6, 1999
In a parody of music videos and home movies, Elmyra and Pinky create their own music video that contains a "YMCA" parody sung over clips from past episodes.
8c	"Squeeze Play"	Nelson Recinos	Erin Ehrlich and Alex Borstein	February 6, 1999
Rudy takes the Brain's latest invention, which Brain needs for his latest plan to take over the world. To get it back, the Brain and Pinky will have to get past Rudy's pet snake.
9a	"Wag the Mouse"	Rob Davies	Ken Segall	February 13, 1999
Elmyra runs for class president, but she does not stand a chance against the other candidates.
9b	"A Walk in the Park"	Rob Davies	Gordon Bressack and Charles Howell	February 20, 1999
Elmyra takes a trip to a Disneyland-esque theme park and the Brain makes plans to switch the looping song recording at the "It's a Small World"-esque ride with a hypnotic message so that he can take over the world. This latest plan fails because the Brain puts in the wrong tape by mistake and Baloney's Greatest Hits plays instead.
10	"Teleport a Friend"	Nelson Recinos	Wendell Morris and Tom Sheppard	February 27, 1999
The only full-length Pinky, Elmyra & the Brain cartoon. Brain's body is fused together with Elmyra's and if the Brain cannot reverse the transformation that was caused by the device that he built, then they will remain that way forever. The Brain and Elmyra's only hope is Pinky, who spends most of the episode chasing a pig.
11a	"Mr. Doctor"	Rob Davies	John P. McCann and Mitch Watson	March 6, 1999
Elmyra takes some of her pets - the Brain, Pinky, the alien from "Cute Little Alienhead", and Mr. Pussy-Wussy - to the vet, who notices that her cat is acting like a dog (a reference to episode 3b, "The Cat that Cried Woof!").
11b	"That's Edutainment"	Nelson Recinos	John P. McCann	March 13, 1999
Pinky and the Brain get their own children's entertainment program.
12a	"Fun, Time and Space"	Rob Davies	John P. McCann	March 20, 1999
The Brain creates a black hole in Elmyra's bedroom, hoping to exploit the theory that black holes can transport people to other universes or send people back in time.
12b	"Hooray for Meat"	Rob Davies	Earl Kress, Wendell Morris, and Tom Sheppard	March 27, 1999
Pinky, Elmyra, and the Brain go to a "Meat Festival". Brain discovers a plan to take over the world using "Meats of Evil".
13a	"Party Night"	Nelson Recinos	John P. McCann	April 3, 1999
Vanity throws a party and invites Rudy, but not Elmyra. She shows up anyway, thinking that Vanity just forgot to invite her.
13b	"The Mask of Braino"	Nelson Recinos	Earl Kress, Charles Howell, Wendell Morris, and Tom Sheppard	April 10, 1999
The Brain becomes Braino, a masked crimefighter and a parody of Zorro.

== See also ==
- Elmyra Duff
- Pinky and the Brain
- Animaniacs
- Tiny Toon Adventures
