= The Plucky Duck Show =

Television series

- Also known as: Steven Spielberg Presents The Plucky Duck Show
- Genre: Comedy
- Created by: Tom Ruegger
- Based on: Tiny Toon Adventures by Warner Bros.
- Directed by: Rich Arons
- Voices of: Joe Alaskey; Don Messick; Charlie Adler; Tress MacNeille; Gail Matthius; Kath Soucie; Cree Summer; Frank Welker; John Kassir
- Theme music composer: Bruce Broughton
- Composers: Richard Stone; Julie Bernstein; Steven Bernstein; Mark Watters; Don Davis (Note: "A Ditch in Time")
- Country of origin: United States
- Original language: English
- No. of seasons: 1
- No. of episodes: 13 (31 segments)

Production
- Executive producer: Steven Spielberg
- Producer: Sherri Stoner
- Running time: 21–22 minutes
- Production companies: Amblin Entertainment; Warner Bros. Animation

Original release
- Network: Fox Kids
- Release: September 19 – December 12, 1992

Related
- Tiny Toon Adventures; Pinky, Elmyra & the Brain

The Plucky Duck Show is an American animated television series produced by Warner Bros. Animation and Amblin Entertainment. It is a spin-off of Tiny Toon Adventures focusing primarily on the character of Plucky Duck. It premiered on September 19, 1992, and ended on December 12, 1992, with a total of 13 episodes.

== History ==
Of the 13 episodes produced, only "The Return of Batduck" was original to the series. All remaining episodes were compilations of Tiny Toons-produced shorts, though some aired on The Plucky Duck Show first.

The theme song is a rendition of the Tiny Toons theme, set to the same music, but with Plucky himself as the subject of the song. Some of the lyrics were reused in the Tiny Toons episode "It's a Wonderful Tiny Toons Christmas Special".

After the show was canceled, "Batduck" was edited and added in as an episode of Tiny Toons. The show's formula was attempted again several years later when Pinky and the Brain, the supporting characters from Animaniacs (Steven Spielberg's next collaboration with Warner Bros. Animation), were also given their own show. Unlike The Plucky Duck Show, however, Pinky and the Brain consists entirely of original material rather than reusing pre-existing shorts from the show it was spun-off from.

The "Yakety Yak" segment was made commercially available on the Tiny Toons Sing! CD/cassette album.

== Episodes ==
=== Series overview ===
Season	Episodes	Originally released	
Season	Episodes	First released	Last released
1	13	September 19, 1992	December 12, 1992

No.	Title	Directed by	Written by	Original release date
1	"The Return of Batduck"	Rich Arons	Written by : Peter Hastings; Storyboarded by : Jim Fletcher (as James Fletcher), Eddie Fitzgerald, Rusty Mills and Jenny Lerew	September 19, 1992
Plucky returns to his role as Batduck to star in a new movie. Note: This is the only episode with John Kassir as Buster.
2	"Ducklahoma"	Rich Arons	Sherri Stoner and Nicholas Hollander	September 26, 1992
2	"Video Game Blues"	–	–	September 26, 1992
2	"Yakety Yak"	–	–	September 26, 1992
2	"Party Crasher Plucky"	Byron Vaughns	Written by : George McGrath; Story by : Sherri Stoner	September 26, 1992
(1.) Actually an edited version of the cartoon, which is a spoof of Oklahoma!. (2.) A musical number in which Plucky and Fowlmouth sing about Plucky's addiction to video games; set to music from The Nutcracker. (3.) A "music video" set to the song Yakety Yak. (4.) Plucky crashes a celebrity party, and brings Shirley the Loon with him.
3	"Minister Golf"	Directed by : Alfred Gimeno; Co-directed by : David West	Tom Ruegger	October 3, 1992
3	"Particle Man"	–	–	October 3, 1992
3	"Istanbul"	–	–	October 3, 1992
3	"My Brilliant Revenge!"	Ken Boyer	Peter Hastings	October 3, 1992
(1.) A "Baby Plucky" cartoon in which Plucky remembers the first time he played miniature golf. (2.) A "music video" set to the song Particle Man. (3.) Another "music video," set to the They Might Be Giants' version of Istanbul (Not Constantinople). (4.) Hamton destroys Plucky's bagpipes in a fit of anger, and Plucky plots a way to get back at Hamton.
4	"Kon Ducki"	Rich Arons	Written by : Sherri Stoner, Peter Hastings and Stephen Hibbert; Storyboarded by : Eddie Fitzgerald, Jim Fletcher (as James Fletcher), Enrique May and Rusty Mills	October 10, 1992
A feature about Pluck Heyerdahl's voyage on the Kon Ducki (which is a parody of the Kon-Tiki); followed by a "making of" featurette.
5	"Inside Plucky Duck"	Art Vitello	Paul Dini and Buzz Dixon	October 17, 1992
5	"Bat's All, Folks"	–	Teleplay by : Paul Dini and Buzz Dixon	October 17, 1992
5	"Wild Takes Class"	Art Vitello	Paul Dini	October 17, 1992
(1.) Plucky and Hamton star as Batduck and Decoy, a parody of Batman and Robin. (2.) Plucky does a cartoon-style take in which he turns into a giant eyeball, but then finds out that he is stuck that way.
6	"A Quack in the Quarks"	Art Vitello	Written by : Tom Minton; Storyboarded by : Douglas McCarthy and Bruce Timm	October 24, 1992
In this spoof of the Star Wars films, aliens choose Plucky to defend their world against a Darth Vader-style villain.
7	"A Ditch in Time"	Art Vitello	Written by : Wayne Kaatz, Art Vitello, Bruce Timm and Douglas McCarthy; Storyboarded by : Bruce Timm and Douglas McCarthy (as Doug McCarthy)	October 31, 1992
Plucky builds a time machine so that he can go back a few days and finish his homework on time, but ends up traveling to prehistoric days.
8	"Going Up"	Byron Vaughns	Written by : Nicholas Hollander; Story by : Tom Ruegger	November 7, 1992
8	"Wait Till Your Father Gets Even"	Ken Boyer	Nicholas Hollander	November 7, 1992
8	"Never Too Late to Loon"	Rich Arons	Jim Reardon	November 7, 1992
(1.) A "Baby Plucky" cartoon in which little Plucky is playing with the buttons in an elevator at the shopping mall. (2.) Hamton loses his father's bottle cap collection to Plucky, and he is afraid to face his father. (3.) Afraid of failing a math test, Plucky asks his psychic girlfriend Shirley the Loon to give him Albert Einstein's brain.
9	"Just-Us League of Supertoons"	Byron Vaughns	Paul Dini	November 14, 1992
9	"A Bacon Strip"	Ken Boyer	Wayne Kaatz	November 14, 1992
9	"Migrant Mallard"	Tom Minton	Rich Arons	November 14, 1992
(1.) Batduck and Decoy try to join the Just-Us League (a parody of the Justice League). (2.) After skinny-dipping in Max's pool, naked Hamton tries to get home without being seen. (3.) Unable to fight his instincts, Plucky flies south for the winter against his will.
10	"Hollywood Plucky"	Art Vitello	Written by : Sherri Stoner; Storyboarded by : Bruce Timm and Douglas McCarthy	November 21, 1992
Plucky, accompanied by Hamton, goes to Hollywood to try to sell his movie script.
11	"The Potty Years"	Jon McClenehan	Written by : Tom Ruegger; Storyboarded by : Ken Boyer and Alfred Gimeno	November 28, 1992
11	"Milk, It Makes a Body Spout"	Rich Arons	Tom Minton and Tom Ruegger	November 28, 1992
11	"The Anvil Chorus"	Art Leonardi	Don Dougherty and Tom Ruegger	November 28, 1992
(1.) The first "Baby Plucky" cartoon, in which Plucky remembers his potty training. (2.) Buster and Plucky have a contest to see who can make Hamton laugh hard enough to shoot the milk he is drinking out of his nose. (3.) An orchestra plays the Anvil Chorus while Plucky tries to avoid the falling anvils that are crashing down around him.
12	"Slugfest"	Art Vitello	Jim Reardon	December 5, 1992
12	"Duck Dodgers Jr."	Written by : Kent Butterworth; Design by : Maurice Noble	Mike Kazaleh, Maurice Noble and Wayne Kaatz	December 5, 1992
12	"Duck Trek"	Ken Boyer	Jim Reardon	December 5, 1992
(1.) In this satire of Teenage Mutant Ninja Turtles, Plucky and Hamton dress up as Plucky's cartoon heroes, the Immature Radioactive Samurai Slugs. (2.) Plucky is Duck Dodgers' sidekick as Dodgers once again faces off against Marvin. (3.) A parody of Star Trek, featuring Plucky in the role of Captain Kirk.
13	"One Minute Till Three"	Rich Arons	Tom Ruegger and Tom Minton	December 12, 1992
13	"Sticky Feathers Duck"	Rich Arons	Beth Bornstein	December 12, 1992
13	"Duck in the Dark"	–	–	December 12, 1992
(1.) Plucky is anxiously waiting for the class to end, and hoping to avoid getting stuck with a weekend assignment for getting the wrong answers. (2.) Plucky and Hamton steal a candy bar, and it weighs on their consciences. (3.) Plucky sleeps over at Buster's house, but stays up late watching horror movies, causing him to have nightmares.
