= Tom Ruegger =

American animator

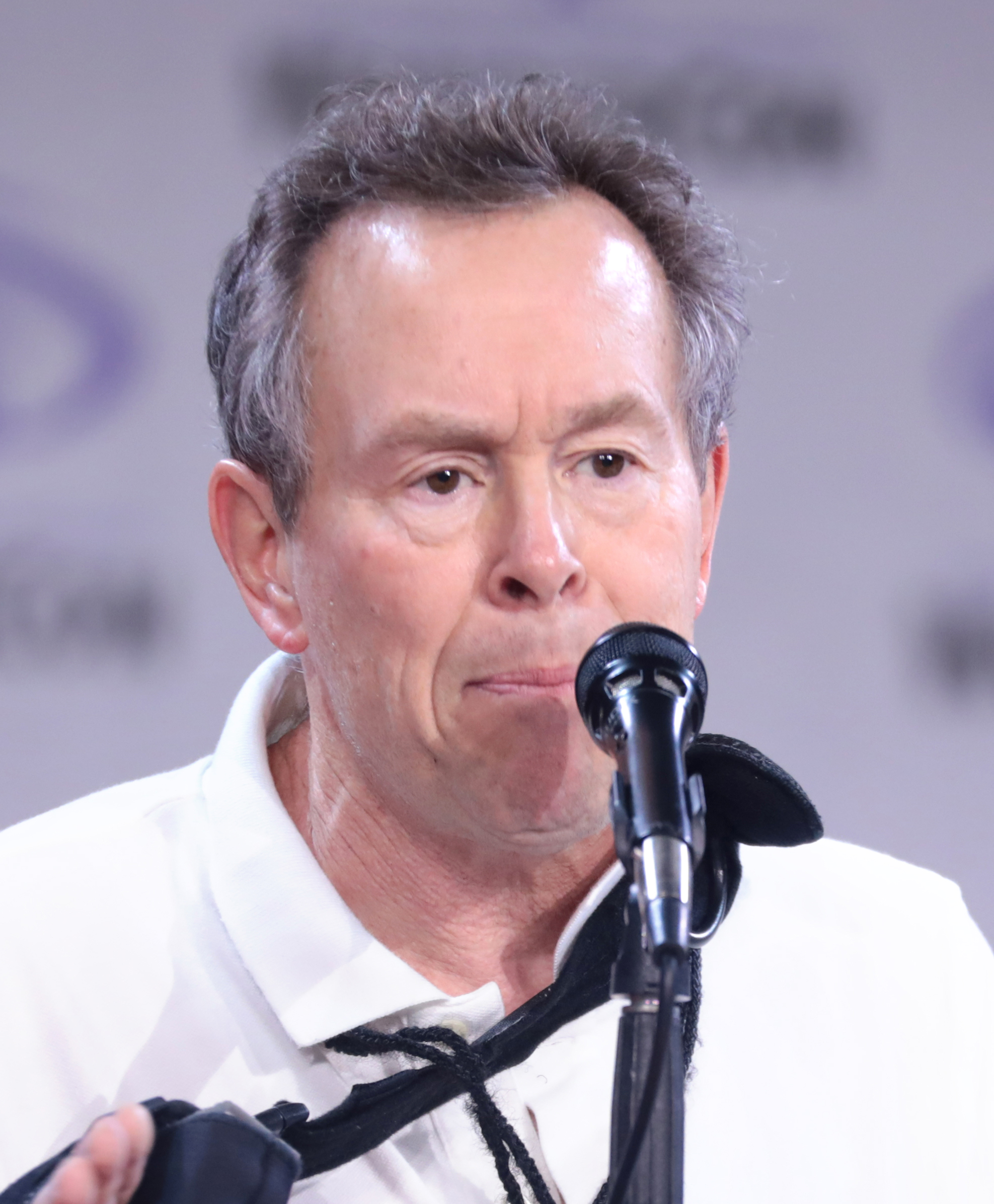
- Ruegger at the 2023 WonderCon
- Born: 1955 or 1956 (age 70–71); Metuchen, New Jersey, U.S.
- Education: Dartmouth College
- Occupations: Animator; songwriter
- Years active: 1976–present
- Spouses: Adrienne Alexander (m. 1983; div. 2004) Annie Malley (m. 2006)
- Children: 3
- Website: cartoonatics.blogspot.com

Tom Ruegger (/ˈruːɡər/) is an American animator and songwriter. Ruegger is known for his association with Disney Television Animation and Warner Bros. Animation. He also created Tiny Toon Adventures, Animaniacs, Pinky and the Brain, and Histeria!.

== Early life and career ==
Ruegger was raised in Metuchen, New Jersey. During his childhood, he made drawings of The Flintstones when it aired. He graduated from Metuchen High School in 1972.

In 1976, he made his first cartoon, called The Premiere of Platypus Duck, while he was a student at Dartmouth College. Shortly after graduation from Dartmouth that year, he moved to Los Angeles to become an animator. Ruegger began his career at Filmation, writing for Gilligan's Planet. He soon after joined Hanna-Barbera, writing and producing various animated series, most notably The New Scooby-Doo Mysteries, Snorks, The 13 Ghosts of Scooby-Doo, Pound Puppies, and A Pup Named Scooby-Doo. He also wrote one episode of He-Man and the Masters of the Universe.

In 1989, he began working alongside Jean MacCurdy and Steven Spielberg at Warner Bros. Animation to create and produce several animated series, including Tiny Toon Adventures, Taz-Mania, Batman: The Animated Series, The Plucky Duck Show, Animaniacs, Pinky and the Brain, Freakazoid, Road Rovers, and Histeria.

In 2004, Ruegger started Tom Ruegger Production, a full-service animation studio. In 2006, Ruegger began developing, story-editing and serving as executive producer on the 40-episode animated series Animalia, based on the picture book by Graeme Base. Along with Nicholas Hollander, he developed and story-edited another animated series entitled Sushi Pack.

In 2011, Ruegger began working for Disney Television Animation, where he executive produced 40 half-hours of The 7D for Disney XD, a comedy based on the seven Dwarfs from Snow White and the Seven Dwarfs.

Ruegger has received fourteen Emmy Awards for his work in animation.

== Personal life ==
Ruegger married voice actress Adrienne Alexander in 1983; they have three sons together, Nathan, Luke and Cody. The couple divorced in 2004. In 2006, he married marathon runner Annie Malley, and they reside near Los Angeles, California. Nathan and Luke have become voice actors. Nathan voiced the baby version of Plucky Duck on Tiny Toon Adventures, Skippy Squirrel on Animaniacs and Froggo on Histeria, where Luke provided the voice for the Flame and Bumpo Basset on Animaniacs and Big Fat Baby on Histeria. Cody performed the voice of Little Blue Bird on Animaniacs and Loud Kiddington on Histeria. Ruegger's sons also are the primary inspiration behind the main characters in Animaniacs, Yakko, Wakko and Dot.

As of 2017, Cody is serving as an attorney in New York City, while Nathan and Luke have careers in film and television in Los Angeles.

Ruegger himself also made occasional cameos on his shows in caricature form, most notably as the recurring character of director Cooper DeVille in Tiny Toon Adventures.

== Filmography ==
=== Film ===
Year	Title	Role
1976	The Premiere of Platypus Duck	Director
1985	Pound Puppies	Writer
1988	The Good, the Bad, and Huckleberry Hound	Writer, Lyricist
1992	Tiny Toon Adventures: How I Spent My Vacation	Writer, Producer, Lyricist
1993	Batman: Mask of the Phantasm	Executive Producer
1999	Wakko's Wish	Writer, Producer, Director, Lyricist
2011	The Voyages of Young Doctor Dolittle	Writer

=== Television ===
Year	Title	Role
1978	Jana of the Jungle	Animator
1978–1979	Godzilla	Animator
1979	The New Fred and Barney Show	Animator
1979	Scooby-Doo and Scrappy-Doo	Animator
1979	Casper and the Angels	Animator
1979	Super Friends	Animator
1979	Tarzan, Lord of the Jungle	Writer
1980	The Tarzan/Lone Ranger/Zorro Adventure Hour	Writer
1980–1981	Sport Billy	Writer
1981	Hero High	Writer
1981	The Kid Super Power Hour with Shazam!	Writer
1981	Blackstar	Writer
1982	Flash Gordon	Writer
1982	Gilligan's Planet	Writer
1982	Shirt Tales	Writer
1982	The Gary Coleman Show	Writer
1983	The Dukes	Writer
1983	He-Man and the Masters of the Universe	Writer
1983–1984	The New Scooby-Doo and Scrappy-Doo Show/The New Scooby-Doo Mysteries	Developer, Writer, Story Editor, Co-Producer
1984	Challenge of the GoBots	Story, Story Editor
1984	Snorks	Story
1985	The 13 Ghosts of Scooby-Doo	Creator, Developer, Story, Story Editor, Executive & Associate Producer
1985–1988	Yogi's Treasure Hunt	Writer, Story Editor
1986–1987	Pound Puppies	Writer, Story Editor
1988	A Pup Named Scooby-Doo	Creator, Developer, Writer, Producer, Storyboard Artist, Title Card Designer, Lyricist, Story
1990–1992; 1994; 1995	Tiny Toon Adventures	Creator, Writer, Story, Producer, Senior Producer, Story Editor, Lyricist
1991–1995	Taz-Mania	Executive Producer
1992	The Plucky Duck Show	Creator, Story, Writer, Producer
1992–1995	Batman: The Animated Series	Writer, Executive Producer, Story, Story Editor
1993–1998	Animaniacs	Creator, Writer, Story, Producer, Senior Producer, Story Editor, Lyricist, Voice Actor
1995–1997	Freakazoid!	Writer, Developer, Senior Producer
1995–1998	Pinky and the Brain	Creator, Writer, Story, Producer, Senior Producer, Story Editor, Lyricist
1996–1997	Road Rovers	Creator, Writer, Executive Producer, Composer
1998–2000	Histeria!	Creator, Writer, Executive Producer, Character Designer, Lyricist
1998–1999	Pinky, Elmyra & the Brain	Creator, Writer, Senior Producer
2000	Batman Beyond	Story
2004	Duck Dodgers	Writer, Story (Episode: Of Course You Know, This Means War and Peace)
2005	Loonatics Unleashed	Creative Consultant
2007	Sushi Pack	Writer, Developer, Executive Producer
2007–2008	Animalia	Developer, Story Editor, Executive Producer, Writer
2010; 2018; 2023	Nostalgia Critic	Special Guest Star
2013–2015	Pac-Man and the Ghostly Adventures	Writer, Creator, Developer
2014–2016	The 7D	Executive Producer, Writer, Composer, Story
