= Road Rovers =

American animated TV series

- Created by: Tom Ruegger; Jeff Gordon
- Written by: Tom Ruegger; Mark Seidenberg
- Directed by: Herb Moore
- Starring: Jess Harnell; Tress MacNeille; Jeff Bennett; Kevin Michael Richardson; Frank Welker; Joseph Campanella; Jim Cummings; Rob Paulsen; Sheena Easton
- Theme music composer: Richard Stone
- Composers: Gordon Goodwin; Don Harper
- Country of origin: United States
- No. of seasons: 1
- No. of episodes: 13

Production
- Executive producer: Tom Ruegger
- Producer: Bob Doucette
- Running time: 22 minutes
- Production company: Warner Bros. Television Animation

Original release
- Network: Kids' WB
- Release: September 7, 1996 – February 22, 1997

Road Rovers is an American animated television series created by Tom Ruegger and produced by Warner Bros. Television Animation that premiered on Kids' WB on September 7, 1996, and ended after one season on February 22, 1997. It was later shown on Cartoon Network from February 7, 1998, until 2000.

The show follows the adventures of the Road Rovers, a team of five super-powered crime-fighting anthropomorphic dogs, known as "cano-sapiens". The characters all live with world leaders, including the President of the United States, the British Prime Minister, the Chancellor of Germany, the Swiss President and the President of Russia.

== Plot ==
One year prior, in Socorro, New Mexico, Professor Shepherd was forced to relinquish his experimental transdogmafier technology to General Parvo in exchange for having his kidnapped dog Scout returned to him, but Parvo refused to do so and destroyed his laboratory. One year later, as Parvo mutates normal dogs into monsters, Shepherd, who miraculously survived the attack, takes measures to stop him.

Shepherd selects five different dogs and in his new, secret underground lab, he uses his new transdogmifier on the five, turning them into "Cano sapiens." These dogs are the pets of world leaders, and when called to action, they are a team of crime fighters known as the Road Rovers.

== Characters ==
- Hunter (voiced by Jess Harnell) – A Goldador from the United States and the leader of the team. Hunter is optimistic, funny, devoted, friendly, level-headed, and an effective leader. Hunter's power is super speed; this allows him to run faster than the speed of sound. He lives with President Bill Clinton in the White House. He also has a crush on Colleen, whom he openly flirts with in the later episodes of the series.
- Colleen (voiced by Tress MacNeille) – A no-nonsense Rough Collie from the United Kingdom, and the only female member of the Road Rovers. She is the coordinator of the team, always checking to see if everything is going well without any problems or issues. Colleen is also very athletic, being a skilled martial artist. She resides with the prime minister of the United Kingdom, John Major, and his wife Norma Johnson. She is openly attracted to Hunter, who she developed a flirtatious relationship with during later episodes of the series.
- Exile (voiced by Kevin Michael Richardson) – A Siberian Husky from Russia. His full name is Exilo Michalovitch Sanhusky. Exile speaks English with a thick Russian accent, sometimes mixing up words in the process. He is somewhat friendly and easygoing, but often clashes with Blitz. Exile is super strong and also has heat, ice, and night vision. He used to work with other huskies as a sled dog, but now lives with Russian president Boris Yeltsin.
- Blitz (voiced by Jeff Bennett impersonating Arnold Schwarzenegger) – A Doberman from Germany. Unlike Hunter, Blitz is often selfish, immature, spiteful, faint-hearted, and has an ill temper. He has razor-sharp claws and strong jaws, which allow him to bite and cut through almost any substance. Blitz was formerly a guard dog for thieves, but now lives with German chancellor Helmut Kohl.
- Shag (voiced by Frank Welker) – A cowardly Old English Sheepdog from Switzerland. Shag only transformed halfway into a Cano-sapien. He is incapable of comprehensible speech and does not wear a uniform. Shag lives with Arnold Koller, the president of the Swiss Confederation.
- Muzzle (voiced by Frank Welker) – Professor Shepherd's Rottweiler, who was originally named Scout. He was kidnapped and experimented on by Parvo, which drove him insane. As a result, he is often restrained on a cart while wearing a straitjacket and mask.
- Persia (voiced by Sheena Easton) – An Afghan Hound and commander of the Space Rovers.
- Professor Hubert (voiced by David Doyle) – A Bloodhound scientist.
- Confusus – A wise dog who lives in the mountains.
- Professor William Shepherd / "The Master" (voiced by Joseph Campanella) – A geneticist who created the transdogmafier and the Road Rovers.
- General Parvo (voiced by Jim Cummings) – The Road Rovers' main enemy, who seeks to destroy Professor Shepherd and conquer the world. He was previously a cat before Shephard's assistant Jeffrey Otitus captured him and transformed him into a "Felo-Sapien". Unlike other transformed animals, he largely resembles a human except for his cat ears, which are usually hidden by his helmet.
- The Groomer (voiced by Sheena Easton) – General Parvo's assistant.
- Zachary Storm (voiced by Larry Drake) – A former member of the Navy with aspirations of world domination.
- Eugene Atwater (voiced by Steve Franken) – A professor and bug enthusiast.
- Cano-mutants – Dogs who were turned into humanoid monsters and led by Parvo.
- Werewolves – A pack of werewolves appearing in "A Hair of the Dog That Bit You". They are led by the Wolf King (voiced by Rob Paulsen).

== Episodes ==
=== Series overview ===
Season	Episodes	Originally released	
Season	Episodes	First released	Last released
1	13	September 7, 1996	February 22, 1997

=== Season 1 (1996–1997) ===
No.	Title	Directed by	Written by	Original release date
1	"Let's Hit the Road"	Herb Moore	Tom Ruegger and Mark Seidenberg	September 7, 1996
One year prior, General Parvo attacks Professor Shepherd's laboratory and forces him to hand over the blueprints for his transdogmifier technology. Parvo then destroys Shepherd's laboratory, with Shepherd barely escaping alive. In the present, Parvo has begun using the transdogmifier technology to transform captured dogs into anthropomorphic forms to act as his minions. Shepherd builds a new lab underground and recruits several dogs from around the world to become the Road Rovers, subjecting them to the same process. He tasks them with stopping Parvo from retrieving a gene splicer which would allow him to perfect the unstable transformation process. After their mission is completed, Shepherd arranges for the Rovers to be adopted by world leaders, living with them in their downtime.
2	"Storm from the Pacific"	Jon McClenahan	Earl Kress and Tom Ruegger	September 14, 1996
An unidentified assailant attacks a destroyer ship, sinking it with a torpedo. They succeed in stealing the codes for a defense satellite, but do not manage to kill anybody onboard. As the Rovers travel to an island to investigate, Shag inadvertently damages their aircraft and causes them to crash-land on the island. After being captured, the Rovers learn that the culprit is Zachary Storm, a disgruntled former Navy member who seeks to destroy the United States with the satellite. Storm captures the group, but Muzzle manages to free them and stop Storm, who escapes.
3	"A Hair of the Dog That Bit You"	Scott Jeralds	John Ludin and Mark Seidenberg	September 21, 1996
The Rovers fend off a pack of wolves in England. That night, the group takes a sample of wolf hair and learn that the British royal family have gone missing after being attacked by the wolves. Shag and Blitz are attacked by a werewolf, at which point the Rovers learn that the original fur sample came from a werewolf. After consulting the dog Confusus, the Rovers learn that they must cure the werewolves by exposing them to swamp water. If they fail, the werewolf curse will remain permanent. During the flight, the Rovers learn that Colleen had become a werewolf after she transforms and attacks Blitz. Colleen escapes in Blitz's vehicle and leaves for Stonehenge, where she will be crowned queen of the werewolves. Shag uses his weapon to create a chasm, gathering all of the werewolves in one place and allowing them to be cured. (WB aired a teaser of an extended version of the episode to air August 31, 1997, but to date, the extended version of the episode has never been aired, as Princess Diana was killed in a car crash just hours before the extended version was scheduled to air)
4	"Where Rovers Dare"	Herb Moore	Brian Chin and Tom Ruegger	October 12, 1996
Centuries prior, the bordering nations of Eisneria and Katzenstok lived in peace until they entered a devastating war. The bridge that linked the two nations was destroyed, with a golden scepter being the only remnant of their golden age. In the present, a group of rebels from Ovitznia led by Gustav Hovac steal the scepter from Katzenstok, with its residents accusing Eisnerian spies of being responsible and threatening to declare war again if the scepter is not recovered. The Rovers learn of Hovac's plans and defeat him with help from a local wolf pack. Faced with the wolves, Hovac is unable to escape, letting the Rovers recover the scepter.
5	"Let Sleeping Dogs Lie"	Blair Peters	Nick Dubois	October 26, 1996
Several ninjas coordinate robberies around the world, stealing ancient Japanese artifacts that previously belonged to samurai. After infiltrating the ninjas' hideout, the Rovers learn that they are dog soldiers working for Parvo, who uses the artifacts to locate a cave containing living dinosaurs. After defeating Parvo, the Rovers seal the cave's entrance and return several of his dogs to normal.
6	"The Dog Who Knew Too Much"	Jon McClenahan	Earl Kress and Tom Ruegger	November 2, 1996
The Road Rovers rescue a dog, Sport, from a kidnapping operation and temporarily recruit him to testify against the suspected perpetrators. While traveling to the courthouse in Miami, the Rovers learn that Parvo and the Groomer are responsible and have forced Sport to work for them in exchange for reuniting with his owner Olivia Peru. However, the Rovers allow Sport to stay with them and expose the culprits.
7	"Hunter's Heroes"	Scott Jeralds	John Ludin and Mark Seidenberg	November 9, 1996
Shag and Colleen infiltrate the headquarters of Parvo under the guise of being normal dogs. While they are there, Parvo and the Groomer contact their associates, revealing that they intend to transport their dog army around the world for a mass attack. Shag and Colleen try to escape the headquarters, but inadvertently blow their cover after one of the other dogs tries to escape, triggering security. The other Rovers infiltrate the base to rescue Shag and Colleen, then rescue the captured dogs before returning them to their owners.
8	"Dawn of the Groomer"	Herb Moore	Mark Seidenberg	November 16, 1996
In 3,000 BC, two Egyptians attempt to perform a ritual to gain immortality before a storm buries the pyramid in sand. In the present, the Groomer acts against Parvo to weaponize cats rather than dogs and chooses to leave his service, to his dismay. The Groomer attempts to perform the same ritual and sacrifice the Rovers to the Egyptian gods, only to be foiled by them and rescued by Parvo. He reveals that he objected to her plans due to being part cat. The Groomer accepts Parvo for who he is, returning to his service.
9	"Still a Few Bugs in the System"	Brad Neave	Nick Dubois	November 23, 1996
Seeing that their dog army is not effective or aggressive enough, Parvo and the Groomer steal the research of professor and bug enthusiast Eugene Atwater and mutate his insects using radiation treatments and the Cano-Mutator. However, the insects refuse to obey Parvo and attempt to cause a worldwide nuclear winter with them as the sole survivors. The Rovers manage to stop the bugs and return them to normal. Atwater is taken to a sanitarium, where he is reunited with his insects.
10	"Reigning Cats and Dogs"	Herb Moore	Tom Ruegger and Mark Seidenberg	February 1, 1997
After a failed attempt to stabilize his body and become fully human, Parvo is reverted to his original form as a cat and transported back in time, where Shepherd adopts him. Shepherd's colleague Jeffrey Otitus, intending to use Shepherd's technology for himself, attempts to kidnap Scout, but is unsuccessful. Instead, Otitus kidnaps Parvo and returns him to his humanoid form. Otitus and Parvo form an alliance and attempt to transform Shepherd's dog Scout. This fails and damages Scout's mind, leaving him aggressive. Parvo attempts to use Scout to bargain with Shepherd, but is thwarted after the time-traveling Rovers send Shepherd a letter informing him of Parvo's betrayal. Scout escapes and is found by animal control.
11	"Gold and Retrievers"	Jon McClenahan	Jeff Kwitny and Tom Ruegger	February 8, 1997
Luka, a blind Brazilian boy, has visions of the Road Rovers and a magic pyramid that can grant wishes to the pure of heart. Meanwhile, Parvo and the Groomer flood the global economy with gold from the pyramid, causing the economy to collapse. After meeting Luka and learning that Parvo kidnapped his guide dog Oso, the Rovers set out to rescue him. Parvo attempts to use the pyramid to wish for world domination, but it rejects him and instead grants Oso's wish to restore Luka's sight.
12	"Take Me to Your Leader"	Brian Chin and Scott Jeralds	Nick Dubois and Mark Seidenberg	February 15, 1997
After his previous encounter with the Road Rovers, Zachary Storm is sentenced to life imprisonment, but is rescued by mercenaries. Storm and the mercenaries launch attacks around the world and brainwash world leaders into fighting one another. The Rovers defeat and capture Storm, but their owners continue to fight and threaten to declare war. Having no time to transform, the Rovers are forced to stop the threat as normal dogs, stalling their owners until the brainwashing wears off. With their minds restored, the leaders call off the missile launches that they intended to set off.
13	"A Day in the Life"	Scott Jeralds	Tom Ruegger	February 22, 1997
The episode showcases an ordinary day for the Rovers, consisting of freeing hostages, attending a peace treaty signing at the United Nations, and tracking down Parvo's UFO. Hunter takes time off to visit his mother on a ranch in Wyoming. After learning that the Rovers are in danger, Hunter returns to save them from Parvo, who threatens to kill them by dropping them into lava.

== Controversy ==
The show drew criticism from parents when a rerun of the first episode was aired. A parent wrote a letter to the executives of Warner Bros. complaining about a scene in the episode where two of the dogs were shown being taken to a gas chamber in a dog pound to be put down. The parent claimed that it was an anti-Semitic display too closely related to the events of the holocaust during World War II, and complained that it was too inappropriate to be shown to children. The episode was pulled, and the show would later be dropped by Kids WB, but was picked up by Cartoon Network.

== Cancellation ==
According to the writers, the show was canceled in part due to an undisclosed lawsuit over the rights to the series. This lawsuit was later revealed to be between Warner Bros. and an individual named Bruce Blumenfeld in December 1996. In it, Blumenfeld claimed Road Rovers was plagiarized from his own attempted children's show known as "Wing Puppies". No specifics were divulged about the outcome of the lawsuit, making the factors around how it contributed to Road Rovers demise unknown.

== Home media ==
A multi-region DVD of the entire series was announced on February 4, 2015, by Warner Archive and released on February 10, 2015. All of the episodes can be purchased digitally on Amazon Prime, Google TV, Apple TV, and YouTube.

== In popular culture ==
A statue of Hunter makes a cameo appearance in The Sylvester & Tweety Mysteries episode "The Stilted Perch".

The Road Rovers make cameo appearances in the Histeria! episode "Big Fat Baby Theatre" where Loud Kiddington's dog "Fetch" bears a strong resemblance to Hunter, and the Teen Titans Go! episode "Huggbees" on a film reel.

== Potential revival ==
In September 2026, ToonHive reported on X that Toby Jones and Geneva Hodgson, two writers and artists known for their work on Regular Show, OK K.O.! Let's Be Heroes and The Mighty Ones, previously pitched a revival of Road Rovers to Warner Bros. Jones says they’d “happily make it in a heartbeat” if WB ever wants to move forward, adding that he’s still holding out hope.
