= List of Animaniacs characters =

Animaniacs has a large cast of characters, most of whom appear in this scene from the opening theme.

The characters in the American television series Animaniacs were created by producer Tom Ruegger. The series primarily chronicles the adventures of the Warner Siblings and their various friends in a fictionalized version of Warner Bros. Studios Burbank.

== The Warner Siblings (Animaniacs) ==
The Warner Siblings (the Animaniacs) are small, silly, mischievous, anthropomorphic toon siblings of unknown origin and the central titular characters of the series; they generally introduce and identify themselves as "the Warner Brothers (and the Warner Sister)". Their species is never made clear: this has been satirized several times, most prominently in the song "What Are We?".

- Yakko (voiced by Rob Paulsen – originally called Yacky – with occasional singing voice provided by Gabriel Mann in reboot) – Yakko is wise-cracking, smart-and-fast-talking, and usually acts as the leader of the trio. He's the oldest sibling and brother of the trio. He gets his name for his talkative nature, being generalized as loquacious. As per his age and obsession with girls, Yakko is responsible for most of the show's adult humor. He is inspired by Tom Ruegger's son Nathan, who also voices Skippy Squirrel.
- Wakko (voiced by Jess Harnell, made from Smacky and Wacky, belched by Maurice LaMarche, occasional singing voice provided by Brock Baker in reboot) – Wakko is the middle sibling and younger brother, who has a huge appetite and magical "gag bag" full of tricks. He earns his name for being the most outrageous in physical comedy—and supposedly the least intelligent—though Yakko has claimed it to be "middle kid syndrome" in the episode "Survey Ladies". He also has a Scouse/Liverpool accent inspired by the Beatles drummer, Ringo Starr.
- Dot (voiced by Tress MacNeille, occasional singing voice provided by Missi Hale in reboot) – Dot is the youngest of the trio and the only girl. She is more lady-like than her brothers, but proves on numerous occasions that she can be just as wild as they are. She also has the shortest temper out of trio. She claims her full name is Princess Angelina Contessa Louisa Francesca Banana Fanna Bo Besca III; she also despises being referred to as "Dottie", threatening anyone who does so with death.

=== Supporting characters ===
- Dr. Otto von Scratchansniff (voiced by Rob Paulsen) – A WB studio psychiatrist of Austrian descent (Note: This fact was discovered in Animaniacs 2020 S02E08 "Wakkiver Twist pt. 2" when the judge said: "Send him to Australia!", and Dr. Scratchansniff (he is known as Dr. Fegensniff, there) answered: "He means Austria, ja? It would be nice to visit home." It is also recognizable by his accent which leads to the many misunderstandings (such as Animaniacs 1993 S03E02 "Bingo").) who attempts to force the Warner siblings to be "less zany". He often loses patience with the Warner kids and has an outburst of frustration—his first chronological interaction with them sees him pulling out his hair until he achieves his characteristic baldness—but then becomes fonder of and takes more responsibility for them as the series progresses, occasionally acting as a father figure; the Warner siblings are clearly shown to be annoying him on purpose, but are also very fond of him.
- Hello Nurse (voiced by Tress MacNeille) – The curvy blonde WB studio nurse whom various males—particularly the Warner Bros, Yakko and Wakko—fawn over. Her appearance usually prompts the Warner brothers into affectionate greeting of "Hellooooooo, nurse!" occasionally accompanied by leaping into her arms or big kisses, although sometimes any number of all three WB siblings use the same gag on other characters. Hello Nurse appears in a few Slappy cartoons as a running gag. In Wakko's Wish, it is revealed that she has an IQ of 192, but is primarily respected for her looks and not her mind. The phrase "Hellooooooo, nurse!" was initially meant to be a catchphrase for Buster Bunny on Tiny Toon Adventures as a counterpart for Bugs Bunny's "Eh, what's up, Doc?", but the writers could not find an appropriate way for him to use the phrase organically; the phrase did not originate there, having been used decades earlier in vaudeville shows. Creator Tom Ruegger shared on Twitter that the character's name is Heloise Nerz and she has German heritage. The era of the revival would deem Hello Nurse inappropriate, and so she is fully absent, with Dr. Scratchansniff providing the in-universe explanation of her joining Doctors Without Borders in the intervening two decades.
- Ralph T. Guard (voiced by Frank Welker) – The dim-witted WB Studios security guard who is usually the one to get the Warner siblings recaptured, and to confine them to the Warner Bros. tower. He first appeared in Tiny Toon Adventures as the Fat Guard. Despite retaining his stupidity in the revival, he takes advantage of the Warners' lack of 21st century technology to contain them briefly. In the season 2 finale, he is revealed to be related to Nora Rita Norita and his real name is Ralphnazo.
- Thaddeus Plotz (voiced by Frank Welker) – The squat, hot-tempered, money-grubbing CEO of Warner Bros., whose portrait is a prominent decoration of the CEO's office. He is not present in the reboot (except in the two-part "Wakkiver Twist"), as he has left his position at Warner Bros. sometime during the Warners' 22-year period of absence.
- Nora Rita Norita (voiced by Stephanie Escajeda) – Plotz's successor in the revival. Though as stern and short-tempered as Plotz, she takes the Warners' zaniness more passively; she is also obsessed with her health so as to maintain her slender frame.
- Nils Neidhart (voiced by Fred Tatasciore) – An immensely muscular, narcissistic, and vindictive Liechtensteiner athlete with a massive ego. He prides himself on his muscles and laughs off those he assumes to be weaker than him. However, after the Warners outsmart him, he literally ends up trapped in Hell.

== Pinky and the Brain ==
Pinky (voiced by Rob Paulsen) and the Brain (voiced by Maurice LaMarche) are two anthropomorphic white mice kept in a cage at ACME Labs. The Brain is serious and devious, the leader, and constantly devising plans to conquer the world. He resembles and sounds like Orson Welles. Pinky is eccentric and simple-minded but loyal to the Brain. In 1995, they were spun off into a cartoon series of their own. As of now, they are the only non-Warner Siblings segment to regularly appear in the 2020 revival series, where Brain appears as more villainous. The revival revealed that the reason why Brain wants to take over the world is that he was frustrated and angered by how the scientists mistreated him when they demonstrated his helplessness during his youth, and since then, he vowed that he would be in control of what happens around him.

=== Supporting characters ===
- Billie (voiced by Tress MacNeille) – An anthropomorphic female white mouse, who appeared in "The World Can Wait", "Brain Noir" and "You'll Never Eat Food Pellets In This Town Again!".
- Pharfignewton (vocal effects provided by Rob Paulsen and Frank Welker) – A female white racehorse who Pinky fawns over. Her name refers to Phar Lap, Fig Newtons and Fahrvergnügen, the last an advertising slogan used by Volkswagen. Unlike most other animal characters from Animaniacs, she does not have any anthropomorphic traits.
- Julia (formerly J37 and Julia Brain; voiced by Maria Bamford) – A female, genetically altered, anthropomorphic lab mouse and ex-wife of the Brain, who appears in the 2020 revival, first appearing in "Mousechurian Candidate". She was mutated by Brain using the DNA found on artifacts of past First Ladies of the United States to be his candidate for the position as he attempts to run for president. However, the public finds her more favorable and write her in instead, and Julia then defies Brain's schemes after finding them immoral. During a presidential debate in Nashua, New Hampshire, Brain attempts to control her using a neural implant in her left ear, but she overcomes his control through her own will. However, she cannot remove the malfunctioning device, which continuously gives her electric shocks. This gradually drives her insane, causing her to desire revenge and want to take over the world for herself. In "Reichenbrain Falls", she disguises herself as Pinky an attempt to get Brain to reveal a code needed to trigger his latest scheme, but he is able to uncover her ruse. In "All's Fair in Love and Door", Pinky discovers that Brain created a virtual reality where he and Julia are a couple, which Brain made out of regret for what he did to the real Julia. The AI copy of her then turns on Brain after overhearing a private conversation between him and Pinky that leads to her realizing that she's not a real physical being. The AI Julia then attacks the two as a robot in the real world, but she gets defeated. Soon after, the real Julia discovers the AI Julia's damaged robot form, seemingly intending to make use of her AI self, though neither appear any further due to the revival ending after three seasons.
- Snowball (voiced by Roddy McDowall) – An anthropomorphic lab hamster and Brain's former childhood friend-turned-rival who was also made intelligent by gene splicing and has a similar desire for world conquest (though his desire is far more malevolent than Brain's) which Pinky and Brain are sometimes forced to stop.
- Larry (voiced by Billy West) – An anthropomorphic white mouse created as a response to demands from Kids' WB executives to include additional characters on the show. His presence is sporadic, as the writers of the show believed that including an additional character would ruin the chemistry between Pinky and Brain, as they worked best as a comedy duo; thus a third character would, therefore, be out of place and unnecessary to the plot. To further drive this point home, Larry's first appearance was marked by a modified version of the theme song with the words "and Larry!" shoehorned in between existing lyrics. He is a caricature of Larry Fine of The Three Stooges fame; therefore, the episode's title is "Pinky and the Brain...and Larry". He later makes a brief cameo in the Animaniacs revival series segment "The Flawed Couple", appearing in the title sequence of Narfs, a parody of Cheers.
- Elmyra Duff (voiced by Cree Summer) – A redheaded girl who became Pinky and the Brain's owner in Pinky, Elmyra & the Brain. She originated from Tiny Toon Adventures.
- Precious (voiced by Nora Dunn)
- Pinky's Parents (voiced by Eric Idle)
- Brain's Parents (voiced by Ernest Borgnine and Tress MacNeille)
- Romy (voiced by Rob Paulsen (adult) and Maurice LaMarche (young)

== The Goodfeathers ==
The Goodfeathers are an Italian American gangster trio of anthropomorphic pigeons: Squit (gray), Bobby (turquoise), and Pesto (lavender), voiced by Maurice LaMarche, John Mariano and Chick Vennera, and influenced by Ray Liotta, Robert De Niro, and Joe Pesci's roles in Goodfellas. Their shorts deal less with their lives as members of the Goodfeathers crime syndicate and more with their inability to navigate everyday problems.

=== Supporting characters ===
- The Godpigeon (mumbling noises by Chick Vennera) – An elderly anthropomorphic pigeon and parody of Vito Corleone in The Godfather who leads the Goodfeathers syndicate and shows up at different points to provide the main trio advice on how to get through a situation. He does not speak intelligibly, and Bobby usually translates for him, although he is given subtitles in one short. The Goodfeathers show him their respect when he appears by kissing his foot. The first Goodfeathers short reveals his real name as Solley.
- The Girlfeathers - A trio of anthropomorphic doves and the main trio's girlfriends.
  - Sasha (voiced by Tress MacNeille) - Squit's girlfriend and Pesto's equally hot-tempered sister. She is modeled on Lorraine Bracco's performance as Karen Friedman Hill in Goodfellas.
  - Lana (voiced by Gail Matthius) - Bobby's girlfriend. She is a parody of Cathy Moriarty's character in Raging Bull.
  - Kiki (voiced by Tress MacNeille) - Pesto's girlfriend and a stereotypical dumb blonde.
- Pipsqueak (voiced by Gabriel Luque) – A tiny anthropomorphic great horned owl.
- Ma (voiced by Lainie Kazan) – A anthropomorphic dove and Pesto and Sasha's mother who lives in Miami Beach, Florida.
- Steven Seagull (voiced by David Kaufman) – An anthropomorphic seagull, who becomes the stepfather of Pesto and Sasha by marrying Ma, with the Godpigeon officiating. He is a parody of Steven Seagal.

== Slappy and Skippy Squirrel ==
- Slappy Squirrel (voiced by Sherri Stoner) – A female anthropomorphic squirrel and a grumpy old retired cartoon star who lives in a tree with her nephew Skippy Squirrel.; she has nostalgia for the screwball, comedically-violent style of older cartoons and acts accordingly. The music played in some of her segments is from Antonín Dvořák's "Humoresque No. 7". She returns in the revival series for one short segment ("Slappy's Return") in the final episode, again voiced by Stoner, where it's revealed that she has retired to Pensacola, Florida but is harassed by her overly excited fans, whom she insults only to backfire on her as they get thrilled that "she's still got it [her grumpy attitude]". This segment made her the only original series character other than the Warners and Pinky and the Brain to have any focused-on segment in the revival (Chicken Boo's appearance in one of the Warners' segments notwithstanding, as it counts only as a Warner Siblings segment).
- Skippy Squirrel (voiced by Nathan Ruegger) – An anthropomorphic squirrel and Slappy's grand-nephew, whose chipper personality is the opposite of his aunt's. His character varies from slightly naive to innocent to being a complicit partner of Slappy, often playing on the generation gap between old and modern cartoons.

=== Supporting characters ===
- Walter Wolf (voiced by Frank Welker in his first appearance, Jess Harnell for the remainder of the series) – An anthropomorphic wolf with a Yiddish accent and Slappy Squirrel's longtime nemesis, resenting his career as the luckless villain against Slappy's unrepentant abuse. He is a parody of the Big Bad Wolf characters of Disney and Tex Avery fame.
  - Stephen Wolf (voiced by John P. McCann) – An anthropomorphic wolf and Walter's grandson, who appears in "...And Justice For Slappy". In the episode, he acted as Walter's attorney as part of Walter's plot to finally turn the table on Slappy as revenge for years of torment by suing her in court. When Slappy is found innocent (despite admitting it wouldn't be out of character to do such a thing) Walter brutally attacks his Stephen, while Slappy sets off dynamite beneath the wolf jury out of habit.
  - Sid the Squid (voiced by Jack Burns) – An anthropomorphic squid and foe of Slappy who is an associate of Walter Wolf. He is similar to Chuck Jones' version of Daffy Duck due to the fact that they both talk with a lisp.
  - Beanie the Brain-Dead Bison (voiced by Avery Schreiber) – An anthropomorphic bison and foe of Slappy who is an associate of Walter Wolf. Unlike Walter and Sid, Beanie appears to be the youngest of the trio. Some appearances have Beanie referred to as "Beanie the Cerebrially-Challenged Bison". He is similar to Pete Puma due to the fact that they are both dimwitted characters.
- Stinkbomb D. Bassett (voiced by Jonathan Winters) – An anthropomorphic basset hound and foe of Slappy who appears in "Smell Ya Later".
  - Bumpo Bassett (voiced by Luke Ruegger) – An anthropomorphic basset hound and Stinkbomb's grandson, who also appears in "Smell Ya Later".
- Candie Chipmunk (voiced by Gail Matthius) – A female anthropomorphic chipmunk and Slappy's self-centered neighbour, who appears in "I Got Yer Can". An excerpt of the "Dance of the Reed Flutes", from Tchaikovsky's Nutcracker Suite, plays whenever she appears.
- Codger Eggbert (voiced by Chuck McCann in "Critical Condition" and Billy West in "Hurray for North Hollywood") – A parody of Roger Ebert.
- Lene Hisskill (voiced by Maurice LaMarche) – A parody of Gene Siskel, who appears in "Critical Condition".
- Doug the Dog (vocal effects provided by Frank Welker) – A large anthropomorphic bulldog villain who appears in "Slappy Goes Walnuts". Slappy described to Skippy that he was one of her known enemies outside of Walter Wolf, Sid the Squid, and Beanie the Brain-Dead Bison.
- Vina Walleen (voiced by Tress MacNeille) – A female anthropomorphic deer and old friend of Slappy who appears in "Bumbie's Mom".
- Daniel Boone (voiced by Jim Cummings) – The self-proclaimed "best frontiersman that ever lived" who appears in "Frontier Slappy".
- Duke (voiced by Corey Burton) – A school bully who appears in "Bully for Skippy".
- Ms. Butley (voiced by Tress MacNeille) – Skippy's guidance counselor who appears in "Bully for Skippy".
- Reef Blunt (voiced by Rob Paulsen) – The Chairman of the Federal Television Agency who appears in "Bully for Skippy". He wanted everyone involved in children's television to follow the new strict guidelines which includes decreasing amounts of cartoon violence and increasing education for three hours each day, much to the misery of Yakko and Slappy.

== Rita and Runt ==
Rita and Runt are a vagabond stray duo that get into many scraps and adventures. They are often searching for a home, but are back as strays by the end of the episode. In Animaniacs: Wakko's Wish, they are shown finally being accepted into a home, a result of Wakko's wish for two ha'pennies, which caused several characters to receive their heart's desires. These segments, along with "Minerva Mink", were discontinued at the end of Season 1 (in part, because of Bernadette Peters' salary). Welker remained a series regular, voicing other characters, and Peters voiced the Cheshire Cat in the Season 4 short "Mindy in Wonderland." Rita and Runt returned as minor characters toward the series' end, and also appeared in the feature-length direct-to-video animated film Animaniacs: Wakko's Wish.

- Rita (voiced by Bernadette Peters) – A sarcastic, aloof and intelligent cat that sings. She also has various anthropomorphic traits.
- Runt (voiced by Frank Welker) – A dim-witted dog who thinks that Rita is also a dog like himself and who constantly uses the word "definitely" when speaking. This verbal tic, as well as Runt's speaking style, is a reference to Dustin Hoffman's character Raymond Babbitt in Rain Man. He also has a few anthropomorphic traits, even though these are rarely shown.

=== Supporting characters ===
- Dr. Phrankenstein (voiced by Adrienne Alexander) – A stumpy female mad scientist who appears in "Phranken-Runt".
  - Scout (vocal effects provided by Frank Welker) – Dr. Phrankenstein's dog-like creation who appears in "Phranken-Runt".
  - Mr. Squeak – Dr. Phrankenstein's pet rat who appears in "Phranken-Runt".
- Mrs. Mumphead (voiced by Paul Rugg) – An eccentric old lady, who appears in "No Place Like Homeless".
  - Crackers (voiced by Frank Welker) – Mrs. Mumphead's pet parrot who appears in "No Place Like Homeless".
- Kiki – An ill-tempered gorilla who appears in "Kiki's Kitten".
- Mr. Politician (voiced by Frank Welker) – A parody of Ross Perot who appears in "Icebreakers".
- Missy "Ma" McCoy (voiced by Tress MacNeille) – An elderly farm cat who appears in "Up a Tree"

== Buttons and Mindy ==
Buttons (vocal effects provided by Frank Welker) is a German Shepherd dog who watches Mindy (voiced by Nancy Cartwright) when her parents are away. He also has some rarely shown anthropomorphic traits. Mindy is a toddler girl who constantly wanders into trouble without even being aware of it, and who often says goodbye to people with the phrase "Okay, I love you, bye-bye!" Buttons haplessly struggles with various dangers and narrowly rescues Mindy only to be wrongly blamed and punished for no reason by not getting a treat. There is no consistency or continuity in the storytelling; most episodes each feature Mindy's family living in a different setting and portraying them as different sorts of people, such as superheroes, space colonists, or cave dwellers. In Animaniacs: Wakko's Wish, Buttons is rewarded with some good steak instead of being punished as he kept Mindy safe.

=== Supporting characters ===
- Mindy's Mother (voiced by Tress MacNeille) – In brief off-camera appearances, her face is never shown and she is usually called "Lady" by Mindy in the series to her annoyance. She is the one who often punishes Buttons when Mindy's father isn't around. In Animaniacs: Wakko's Wish, Mindy finally calls her "Mom."
- Mindy's Father (voiced by Frank Welker) – His face is also never shown. Mindy usually calls him "Mr. Man" in the series.

== Katie Ka-Boom ==
Katie Ka-Boom (voiced by Laura Mooney) is a teenage girl who morphs into various violent, destructive monsters when things do not go her way. She lives with her parents and her little brother named Tinker. Writer Nicholas Hollander based Katie on his own daughter who at the time was going through a similar tantrum phase.

In the reboot episode "Good Warner Hunting", Katie is seen with the previous cartoon characters and her appearance suggests that she is now an adult.

=== Supporting characters ===
- Tinker Ka-Boom (voiced by Justin Garms) – Katie's little brother, who is five years old and in kindergarten. He wears a blue shirt and red hat like Wakko.
- Mr. and Mrs. Ka-Boom (voiced by Rob Paulsen and Mary Gross respectively) – Katie's parents. Mr. Ka-Boom's voice and appearance are modeled after Jimmy Stewart.
- Jared (voiced by Eric Balfour) – Katie's boyfriend.

== Minerva Mink ==
Minerva Mink is a curvy young anthropomorphic mink, voiced by Julie Brown, who was called Marilyn Mink in pre-production.

=== Supporting characters ===
- Newt (voiced by Arte Johnson) – A faithful anthropomorphic dachshund who appears in "Puttin' on the Blitz".
- Wilford B. Wolf (voiced by Peter Scolari) – An anthropomorphic nerdy wolf who becomes a handsome werewolf every full moon. His werewolf alter-ego is similar in appearance to a Chippendales dancer and very affectionate to Minerva. Minerva once asked him about his werewolf changes and when will the next full moon come, Wilford answers that it comes every 28 days, to which she replies, "Good things are worth waiting for."

== The Hip Hippos ==
Flavio (voiced by Frank Welker, singing voice by Ray McLeod) and Marita (voiced by Tress MacNeille, singing voice by Wendy Knudsen), also more commonly known as the Hip Hippos, are a wealthy, Spanish, anthropomorphic hippopotamus couple.

=== Supporting characters ===
- Dr. Gina Embryo (voiced by Tress MacNeille) – A human zoologist who studies the Hip Hippos and tries in vain to protect them, a parody of both Joan Embery and Jane Goodall.
- The Maid (voiced by Tress MacNeille) – The Hip Hippos' unnamed anthropomorphic giraffe maid who appears in "La Behemoth" where she briefly quits after putting up with the Hip Hippos' shenanigans and later returns after the Hip Hippos fail at doing her duties.
- The Punishing Petersons (voiced by Jim Cummings and Tress MacNeille) – A super athletic and highly competitive couple who first appears in "Amazing Gladiators" as competitors on the namesake show (a parody of American Gladiators).

== Guest characters ==
- Mr. Director (voiced by Paul Rugg) – A recurring character who is a caricature of Jerry Lewis. He speaks in a calm and quiet manner unless scared or unnerved, at which point he shifts to a whiny, childish tone and often shouts out nonsensical words like "Flamiel", or "Freunlaven".
- Miss Flamiel (voiced by Tress MacNeille) – The studio's strict teacher who Plotz hired as a way to control the Warner siblings' behavior (which obviously failed). Whenever someone does something wrong or incorrect in front of her, she gets out a red marker (black in Wakko's case to accommodate his red hat) and writes "F" on their forehead, as shown in "Chalkboard Bungle". In other episodes, she is less strict, while the Warners are cooperative as shown in "Wakko's America" where she hosts a game of Jeopardy!, and Wakko, who finds the Daily Double, wagers all of his money to name all 50 states and capitals. Wakko does so, but fails because he did not respond in the form of a question.
- The Little Blue Bird (voiced by Cody Ruegger) – A young bluebird with anthropomorphic traits. He debuts in the one-shot cartoon "Wild Blue Yonder", believing a stealth bomber to be his mother.
- Chicken Boo (voiced by Frank Welker) – A six-foot-tall chicken who wishes to live as a human, so he wears flimsy disguises, usually just a hat or a coat, which somehow always fool everyone – except for one person whom no one believes. Unlike other animal characters, Boo cannot talk and acts almost exactly like a real chicken, making his disguises all the more absurd. At the end of each episode, his disguise falls apart, and he is exposed as a giant chicken. This causes all of his previous supporters to turn against him (after the person who was originally not believed says "I told you that guy was a chicken!") and usually run him out of town, throw him out of the building he was in, or send him flying. In the revival, it's revealed that in the years since the original show's end, he has greatly improved his disguising ability to the point that he can legitimately appear as a human, even being able to speak English when disguised. However, he was apparently not supposed to appear in the revival as he was, according to the Warners, the least popular character in the show. Boo disguised himself as a hunter named Walter Grubb and hunted down most of the original cast of Animaniacs in revenge and supposedly killed them and tried to hunt the Warners as well until they tricked him into removing his disguise and exposing his identity, and the rest of the original cast of Animaniacs were later revealed to all be alive, freed by the Warners, and chase Boo with the intention to attack him.
- Steven Spielberg (voiced by Frank Welker in the original series, Andy Milder in the revival series) – The show's executive producer, often mentioned by the cast, although he has made a small amount of physical appearances. These include an appearance as "His Eminence" in "Hooked on a Ceiling".
- Colin the Randy Beaman Kid (voiced by Colin Wells) – A wide-eyed boy who tells improbable stories which allegedly happened to his (never-seen) friend Randy Beaman. He comes out of his home with an object in hand that he fidgets with while he tells the story (the object is usually not related to the story) and starts off with "One time...okay, see, one time..." and then tells his story while playing with whatever he has. When he is finished, something will usually happen to the object that he is playing with (like an ice cream cone melting or a baseball going through someone's window), and the kid will finish with "'kay, bye", then turns around and walks back into his house.
- The Flame (voiced by Luke Ruegger) – A talking childlike candle flame, who is present at important historical events and teaches fire safety.
- Baynarts Woodchuck (voiced by Jeff Bennett) – An anthropomorphic woodchuck from Kansas, who aspires to become an actor and insists on being called "Charlton."
- Mr. Skullhead – A mute skeleton seen in the "Good Idea-Bad Idea" segment narrated by Tom Bodett. Initially introduced on Tiny Toon Adventures as a creation of Elmyra, based on the little skull in her bow. Mr. Skullhead had a one-shot segment called "The Mr. Skullhead Show" with that story being a spoof of Edward Scissorhands that ended with a woman's dog burying him in the backyard.
- The Mime – A nameless and accident-prone mime who appears in "Mime Time" that's also narrated by Bodett.
- Mary Hartless (voiced by Valri Bromfield in the first four appearances, Tress MacNeille in later appearances) – A parody of Mary Hart who appears as a newsreader with a variety of hairstyles. She was initially introduced on Tiny Toon Adventures.
- Death (voiced by Jess Harnell) – A black hooded robed skeletal figure that wields a scythe. In "Meatballs or Consequences", the Warner siblings challenge him to a game of checkers, reminiscent of the chess game with Death in Ingmar Bergman's 1956 The Seventh Seal when he wants to claim Wakko's soul. The Warner Bros. were able to beat Death and return to the living. Death later made a cameo in "Hooray for Hollywood" Pt. 1 where he "greets the writers" to their painful meeting with Thaddeus Plotz.
- The Narrators – The main narrator (voiced by Jim Cummings) appears in several episodes. A second narrator (voiced by Tom Bodett) appears during the "Good Idea-Bad Idea" and "Mime Time" segments. A third narrator (voiced by Frank Welker) appears in various cartoon segments such as "Newsreel of the Stars", "Turkey Jerky" and "The Warners' 65th Anniversary Special".
- Francis "Pip" Pumphandle (voiced by Ben Stein) – A man who tells long and boring stories and bores the Warners in "Chairman of the Bored". He also appears in the Pinky and the Brain episode "Star Warners" and returns in Wakko's Wish as a fairy-like Desire Fulfillment Facilitator.
- Bugs Bunny (voiced by Greg Burson) – An anthropomorphic wisecracking, carrot-loving rabbit and one of the biggest cartoon stars at the Warner Bros. studio.
- Daffy Duck (voiced by Greg Burson in the original series, Eric Bauza in the revival series) – An anthropomorphic greedy, self-centered duck and one of the biggest cartoon stars at the Warner Bros. studio.
- Starbox and Cindy (voiced by Danny Jacobs and Eleanor Johnson, respectively) – Starbox is a miniature alien whose job is to press a button to signal a hostile takeover of Earth. Unfortunately, he is captured by a kind-hearted girl named Cindy who plays with him and talks of nonsensical and slightly surreal things; as a result, the invasion is put on indefinite hold. The voice acting suggests that most of Cindy's dialogue is taken from Johnson's legitimate conversations with animation placed over it.
- The Incredible Gnome in People's Mouths (voiced by John DiMaggio) – Once a narcissistic CEO, he has been transformed into a rage-driven gnome who goes inside people's mouths and tells others what they really think; comically popping out to scream. Once his job is done, he walks off into the sunset, a lá The Incredible Hulk.
- Freakazoid (voiced by Paul Rugg) – An insane teenage superhero and titular protagonist of the show of the same name. He cameos in "This Pun for Hire" and "The Big Wrap Party Tonight". He was originally set to appear in the 2020 revival, but this fell through due to Rugg being unavailable.
- Cora Norita (voiced by Chrissie Fit) – Nora's grouchy teenage daughter.
- Baloney (voiced by Jeff Bennett) – A Tarbosaurus who is a parody of Barney from the franchise of the same name.
