= Jess Harnell =

American voice actor and singer (born 1963)

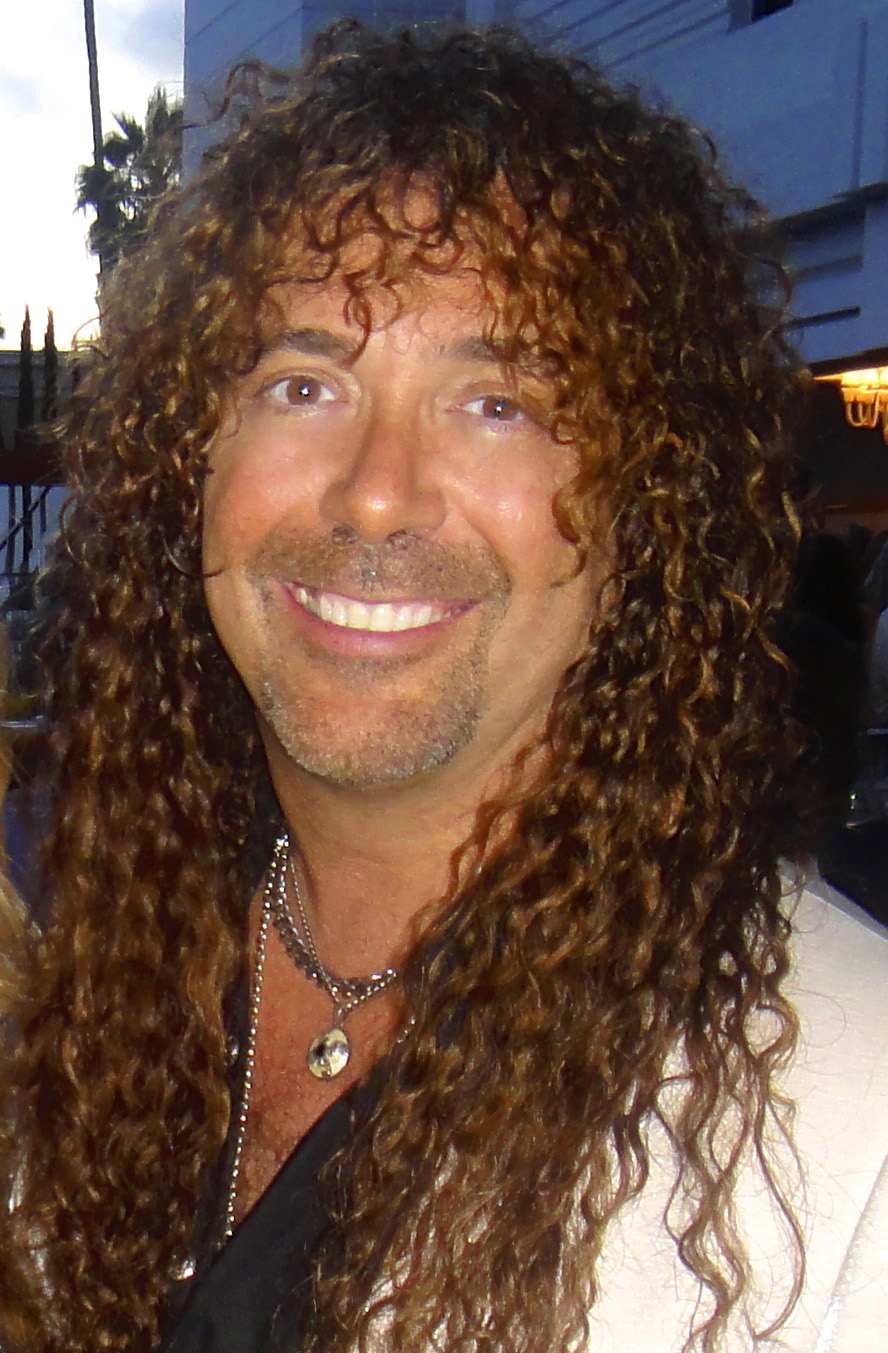
- Harnell in 2013
- Born: December 23, 1963 (age 62); Englewood, New Jersey, U.S.
- Occupations: Voice actor; singer
- Years active: 1987–present
- Spouse: Cara Leanne (m. 2019)
- Father: Joe Harnell
- Musical career
- Genres: Heavy metal; hard rock
- Instrument: Vocals
- Member of: Rock Sugar

Jess Harnell (born December 23, 1963) is an American voice actor and singer. His roles include Wakko Warner in Animaniacs, Br'er Rabbit in media since 1989, Captain Hero in Drawn Together, Taxicrab in Jungle Junction, Chilly in Doc McStuffins, Cedric in Sofia the First, Texas in Motorcity, Grim Gloom in The 7D, Jerry in the first two seasons of Totally Spies!, Ironhide in the first three Transformers films directed by Michael Bay, Wooton Bassett in the Christian radio program Adventures in Odyssey, and the titular character in the Crash Bandicoot franchise. Harnell has also been the announcer for America's Funniest Home Videos since 1998.

== Early life ==
Harnell was born on December 23, 1963, at Englewood Hospital and Medical Center in Englewood, New Jersey, and grew up in nearby Teaneck, the son of Joe Harnell (a jazz composer) and his wife Alice (née Penslar) Harnell.

== Career ==
In 1989, Harnell provided the voices of Br'er Rabbit and many other critters for the Splash Mountain attraction at Disneyland Park. Harnell also recorded some new character dialogue for the subsequent Walt Disney World version of the attraction. He has continued to reprise the role of Brer Rabbit in new Disney projects when needed, such as in the 2011 video game Kinect: Disneyland Adventures.

In 1990, Harnell served as a casting director on DuckTales the Movie: Treasure of the Lost Lamp. In 1993, he went on to voice Wakko Warner on Animaniacs and Secret Squirrel on 2 Stupid Dogs. That same year, he became the singing voice of father in the current version of Walt Disney's Carousel of Progress. From 1994 to 1996, he supplied the voices of Sewer Urchin, the Human Bullet and Chief Louder in the animated series The Tick.

Also, in 1996, Harnell voiced Hunter in Road Rovers. One of Harnell's next appearances was as the principal stormtrooper in the 1997 Star Wars fan film Troops, a parody of Cops set in the Star Wars expanded universe. Harnell voiced Rudy's father, Joe Tabootie and Chalk Dad on the Nickelodeon show ChalkZone, Crash Bandicoot in Crash Tag Team Racing, Crash of the Titans, Crash: Mind over Mutant, and Crash Bandicoot N Sane Trilogy, Lo-Lo in Crash Bandicoot: The Wrath of Cortex, Rodney Copperbottom in the Robots video game, Spyro the Dragon in Spyro: A Hero's Tail and Spyro: Shadow Legacy, Marlin, Bruce and Crazy Drivers in the Finding Nemo video game, Jerry in the first two seasons of Totally Spies!, Linguni in Pucca and Dr. Finkelstein in The Nightmare Before Christmas' video game spin-offs, as well as in the Kingdom Hearts series. In 2005, he voiced Buzz Blister in Tom and Jerry: Blast Off to Mars and numerous other characters in subsequent Tom and Jerry features. He also voiced wild and energetic Cro-Magnon Doubledome from the Longhair and Doubledome cartoon shorts for Cartoon Network's Big Pick (also starring Daniel Davis as Longhair).

In 2001, Harnell was the singing voice of Buster on Lady and the Tramp II: Scamp's Adventure. He also voiced Captain Hero on Comedy Central's animated comedy Drawn Together and he also does the voices of Wooton Bassett and Bennett Charles on the radio drama Adventures in Odyssey, as well as playing the lead role of Finnian Jones for the Lamplighter Theatre Radio Drama. He also made appearances on Superhuman Samurai Syber-Squad. His voice also made an appearance in NASCAR Rumble, and is credited for in-game commentary in the follow-up game Rumble Racing. Jess also replaced Brad Garrett as the voice of Fatso during season 3 of The Spooktacular New Adventures of Casper. He also guest starred in Samurai Jack as he voiced Ringo and a waitress in the episode "Jack Under the Sea". He also produced the 2004 film Comic Book: The Movie along with Billy West, Mark Hamill, Eric Mittleman, Scott Zakarin and Roger Rose as well as playing the character Ricky. In 2006, he worked as a voice director on Pet Alien. In 2007, he replaced Neil Flynn as the voice of The Plumber in Ratchet & Clank Future: Tools of Destruction and Ratchet & Clank Future: A Crack in Time. He also voiced the Smuggler in that popular series.

In that same year, Harnell voiced the characters of Ironhide and Barricade in the Michael Bay-directed Transformers, making him the only voice actor to play both an Autobot (Ironhide) and a Decepticon (Barricade) in that film. He returned to voice Ironhide once again in Transformers: Revenge of the Fallen and Transformers: Dark of the Moon as well as Barricade in Transformers: The Last Knight.

Harnell voiced a character in Up and replaced Brad Garrett as the voice of Professor Buffo in Special Agent Oso. He also voiced Flip Wreck, Blast Zone and Bucko in the Skylanders reboot of the franchise and The Cowardly Lion and Reegull in Lego Dimensions (the former role he would reprise in the 2017-2020 Boomerang show Dorothy and the Wizard of Oz). Harnell also provided the voice of Cedric in Sofia the First from 2013 to 2018.

== Music career ==
Harnell released his only solo studio album, The Sound of Your Voice, in 1995. He is the lead vocalist in the pop/metal mashup rock band, Rock Sugar, which evolved from his previous band, Loud & Clear. With Loud & Clear or Rock Sugar, Harnell released five albums: Disc-Connected (2003), self-titled demo album (2007), Festival of Fire (2008), Reimaginator (2010), and Reinventinator (2021).

== Personal life ==
Harnell is a Christian. On November 8, 2019, Harnell proposed to his girlfriend Cara Leanne, and the couple married on November 19.

== Filmography ==
=== Film ===
List of voice performances in feature and direct-to-video films
| Year | Title | Role | Notes | Reference(s) |
|---|---|---|---|---|
| 1994 | Yakko's World: An Animaniacs Singalong | Wakko Warner | Direct-to-video film | |
| 1994 | Pom Poko | Gyobu | (2005 English dub) | |
| 1995 | Casper | Casper's Arnold Schwarzenegger impression | | |
| 1996 | The Hunchback of Notre Dame | Frollo's Soldiers | | |
| 1996 | Aladdin and the King of Thieves | Fat Thief | Direct-to-video film | |
| 1996 | Mostly In Toon: An Animaniacs Singalong | Wakko Warner | Direct-to-video film | |
| 1997 | Casper: A Spirited Beginning | Fatso | Direct-to-video film | |
| 1998 | Casper Meets Wendy | Fatso | Direct-to-video film | |
| 1998 | Quest for Camelot | Construction worker | | |
| 1999 | We Wish You a Merry Christmas | Santa, Man #1, Man #2 | Direct-to-video film | |
| 1999 | Our Friend, Martin | Reporter #1, Demonstrator | Direct-to-video film | |
| 1999 | O' Christmas Tree | Man in House, Skunk, Santa | Direct-to-video film | |
| 1999 | Wakko's Wish | Wakko Warner | Direct-to-video film | |
| 2000 | Lion of Oz | Singer | | |
| 2000 | Joseph: King of Dreams | Issachar, Lead Trader | Direct-to-video | |
| 2000 | The Life & Adventures of Santa Claus | Wagif Knook, Giant | Direct-to-video film | |
| 2000 | Little Nicky | Gary the Monster | | |
| 2000 | The Emperor's New Groove | Guard | | |
| 2001 | Lady and the Tramp II: Scamp's Adventure | Buster (singing voice) | Direct-to-video | |
| 2001 | Max Keeble's Big Move | MacGoogles | | |
| 2002 | Tom and Jerry: The Magic Ring | Policeman | | |
| 2002 | Scooby-Doo | Creatures | | |
| 2002 | Lilo & Stitch | Hawaiian Man | | |
| 2003 | The Jungle Book 2 | Dizzy, Ziggy | | |
| 2003 | Finding Nemo | Seagulls | | |
| 2004 | Comic Book: The Movie | Ricky | Direct-to-video film; also producer | |
| 2004 | Clifford's Really Big Movie | Dirk | | |
| 2004 | Mickey, Donald, Goofy: The Three Musketeers | Major General | Direct-to-video | |
| 2004 | iMucha Lucha!: The Return of El Malefico | Don Cerebro, Vegas Lounge Singer | | |
| 2004 | Kangaroo Jack: G'Day U.S.A.! | Dude #2 | | |
| 2005 | Racing Stripes | Horse #1 | | |
| 2005 | Tom and Jerry: Blast Off to Mars | Buzz Blister, Martian General, Worker #3 | Direct-to-video film | |
| 2005 | Tom and Jerry: The Fast and the Furry | Buzz Blister, Film Director | Direct-to-video film | |
| 2006 | Ice Age: The Meltdown | Male Macrauchenia | | |
| 2006 | Asterix and the Vikings | Cacofonix | English version | |
| 2006 | Tales from Earthsea | Messenger #2, Hazia Dealer | English version | |
| 2007 | Surf's Up | Male Penguin #4 | | |
| 2007 | Transformers | Ironhide, Barricade | | |
| 2007 | Underdog | Astronaut | | |
| 2008 | Horton Hears a Who! | Another Who | | |
| 2008 | Dragon Hunters | Gildas | (English version) | |
| 2008 | WALL-E | Axiom Passenger #9 | | |
| 2008 | Igor | Announcer, Royal Guard #2 | | |
| 2009 | Up | Nurse AJ | | |
| 2009 | Transformers: Revenge of the Fallen | Ironhide | Nominated - Golden Raspberry Award for Worst Screen Couple; Shared with Shia LaBeouf and either Megan Fox or any "Transformer" | |
| 2009 | Dragon Hunters | Gildas | | |
| 2009 | The Haunted World of El Superbeasto | Cameraman, Astronaut, Willey the Worm, Uncle Carl | | |
| 2010 | The Drawn Together Movie: The Movie! | Captain Hero, Wile E. Coyote | | |
| 2010 | Tom and Jerry Meet Sherlock Holmes | Pan, Brett Jeremy | Direct-to-video | |
| 2011 | Transformers: Dark of the Moon | Ironhide | Nominated - Golden Raspberry Award for Worst Screen Ensemble; Shared with the entire cast | |
| 2012 | Tom and Jerry: Robin Hood and His Merry Mouse | Pan | | |
| 2012 | Big Top Scooby-Doo! | Human Scooby-Doo, Guard | Direct-to-video | |
| 2012 | Wreck-It Ralph | Don | | |
| 2013 | Monsters University | Fraternity Brother, MU Security Monster | | |
| 2014 | Mr. Peabody & Sherman | George Washington, Abraham Lincoln, Bill Clinton, Isaac Newton, New York City cop | | |
| 2014 | The Hero of Color City | Green | | |
| 2014 | Tom and Jerry: The Lost Dragon | Pan | | |
| 2014 | Tyler Perry's Madea's Tough Love | Campaign Manager, Announcer | | |
| 2015 | Tom and Jerry: Spy Quest | Pan | | |
| 2015 | Looney Tunes: Rabbits Run | Tosh, Pete Puma | Direct-to-video | |
| 2016 | Norm of the North | Male Tourist | | |
| 2016 | The Secret Life of Pets | Papillon | | |
| 2016 | Nerdlands | Reporter Jess | | |
| 2017 | Transformers: The Last Knight | Barricade | | |
| 2017 | Tangled: Before Ever After | Pocket | Television film | |
| 2017 | Tom and Jerry: Willy Wonka and the Chocolate Factory | Grandpa Joe | Direct-to-video | |
| 2017 | The Nut Job 2: Nutty by Nature | Animal Control Guy #1 | | |
| 2017 | Deep | Luigi | | |
| 2021 | Rick + Morty in the Eternal Nightmare Machine | Scary Terry | Short film | |
| 2021 | History of Swear Words | Grandpa | | |
| 2023 | Once Upon a Studio | Scuttle | Short film | |

=== Television ===
List of voice performances in television shows
| Year | Title | Role | Notes | Reference(s) |
|---|---|---|---|---|
| 1993 | Teenage Mutant Ninja Turtles | Captain Zorax, Wolf Jackson | Episode: "Night of the Dark Turtle" | |
| 1993 | Bonkers | Toon Bomb, Charlie the Toon Pig, Heckler | 5 episodes | |
| 1993 | 2 Stupid Dogs | Secret Squirrel, Scirocco Mole | | |
| 1993–1995 | Biker Mice from Mars | Evil Eye Weevil, Honka Loogie | 5 episodes | |
| 1993–1998 | Animaniacs | Wakko Warner, Walter Wolf, Alvey, Humphrey Bogart, Cabby | Main role | |
| 1994 | Superhuman Samurai Syber-Squad | Man on Street, Radio Nerd, Rock n' Roll Virus | 3 episodes | |
| 1994 | Tiny Toon Spring Break Special | Michael Molten-Lava, Rank | Television special | |
| 1995 | The Shnookums & Meat Funny Cartoon Show | Lieutenant Tension, Floyd the Insane Rattlesnake, Polite Coyotes, Easter Bunny Imposter, Al Dog, Spidey, Power Weasel, Bat Guy | | |
| 1995 | Empty Nest | Vince | Episode: "Harry Weston: Man's Best Friend" | |
| 1995 | What a Cartoon! | Cerberus | | |
| 1995 | Freakazoid! | Wakko Warner | | |
| 1995 | Dumb and Dumber | Ox | | |
| 1995–1999 | Cow and Chicken | Workman #2 | 3 episodes | |
| 1995–1999 | Timon & Pumbaa | Bugs, Santa's Elf, Male Children, Carolers, The Dingo | 5 episodes | |
| 1996 | Fantastic Four | Impossible Man, Super-Skrull | Episode: "Hopelessly Impossible" | |
| 1996 | Road Rovers | Hunter | 13 episodes | |
| 1996–1998 | The Spooktacular New Adventures of Casper | Fatso | | |
| 1997 | I Am Weasel | Admiral Bullets, French Prime Minister, Workman | Episode: "This Bridge, Not Weasel Bridge" | |
| 1997 | The Weird Al Show | Dr. Legume | Episode: "One for the Record Books" | |
| 1997 | Jungle Cubs | Toucan | Episode: "Old Green Teeth" | |
| 1997 | Kyûketsuki Miyu | Takashi Kashiwabara | Episode: "The Red Shoe's" | |
| 1997–1998 | Recess | Micky McCloud | 3 episodes | |
| 1997–1999 | Rugrats | Guide, Singer, Jingle Singer | 2 episodes | |
| 1998 | The Wild Thornberrys | Marsh Deer, Tortoise | Episode: "Vacant Lot" | |
| 1998–present | America's Funniest Home Videos | Himself | Announcer | |
| 1998–1999 | The Secret Files of the Spy Dogs | William, Big Jim Jones, Frank Sir | 4 episodes | |
| 1998–1999 | Mad Jack the Pirate | Snuck | | |
| 2000 | Buzz Lightyear of Star Command | Bartender Heads, Clay, Bomb Vender, Gramps Munchapper, Keno Kentrix, Dealer, Announcer #3 | | |
| 2001 | The Simpsons | Charlton Heston sound bite | Episode: "The Parent Rap" | |
| 2001 | The Drew Carey Show | Elvis Performer | Episode: "Drew and the King" | |
| 2001–2002 | Horrible Histories | Darren Dongle | | |
| 2001–2002 | House of Mouse | Buzzy the Vulture, Ziggy the Vulture, Dizzy the Vulture, Flaps the Vulture | | |
| 2001–2004 | Totally Spies! | Jerry, Frankie Dude, Coach | | |
| 2001–2003 | Butt-Ugly Martians | Do-Wah Diddy | | |
| 2002–2004 | ChalkZone | Joe Tabootie, Chalk Dad, Lars, Announcer | | |
| 2002–2008 | Codename: Kids Next Door | Ice Cream Man, Chef Pierre, Dr. Phineas B. Sharp | 5 episodes | |
| 2003 | Clifford the Big Red Dog | Rexxington, Singing Dog | Episode: "Food for Thought" | |
| 2003 | Evil Con Carne | Harv, Policeman, Radio Singer | Episode: "Gridlocked and Loaded" | |
| 2003 | The Powerpuff Girls | Gnome, Elders, Male Townie | Episode: "See Me, Feel Me, Gnomey" | |
| 2003 | Ozzy & Drix | Shwee | Episode: "Gas of Doom" | |
| 2003 | Dexter's Laboratory | Boy Band Germ #2, Boy Band Germ #4, Boy Band Germ #5 | Episode: "Head Band" | |
| 2003–2005 | Duck Dodgers | Tosh Gopher, Captain Peters, Puerco | | |
| 2003–2005 | Clifford's Puppy Days | Jorge, Mr. Sidarsky, Mr.Digby | | |
| 2004 | What's New, Scooby-Doo? | Constable, Flute Player, Shane Flinty | Episode: "Large Dragon at Large" | |
| 2004 | The Fairly OddParents | Singer | Episode: "Shelf Life" | |
| 2004 | Higglytown Heroes | Higglyhune Chief, Laundry Worker | Episode: "Higgly Islands", Wayne's Day to Shine | |
| 2004 | My Life as a Teenage Robot | Singer, Todd's Dad | Episode: "A Robot for All Seasons" | |
| 2004 | The Adventures of Jimmy Neutron: Boy Genius | Singing Meldar | Episode: "Win, Lose, and Kaboom!" | |
| 2004–2007 | Drawn Together | Captain Hero | Main role | |
| 2004–2007 | Pet Alien | Gumpers, Swanky, Granville DeSpray, Pop-sicle | Nominated - Daytime Emmy Award for Outstanding Performer in an Animated Program | |
| 2005 | The Buzz on Maggie | Eugene, Wendell | 3 episodes | |
| 2005 | A.T.O.M. | Richter, Optical, Deezel | | |
| 2005 | Tripping the Rift | Captain Kirk | Episode: "Chode & Bobo's High School Reunion" | |
| 2005 | The Kellys | Denny Kelly, Calvin T. Tibbins | | |
| 2006 | My Gym Partner's a Monkey | Bear Kid, Crocodile | Episode: "Me Adam, You Jake" | |
| 2006 | Catscratch | Mitchell the Mammoth | Episode: "A Wooly Adventure" | |
| 2006–2007 | Biker Mice from Mars | Ronaldo Rump, Dr. Catorkian, Bangers, Camembert | | |
| 2006–2009 | The Replacements | Donny Rottweiler | | |
| 2007 | Random! Cartoons | Crank The Mall Security Guard | Episode: "Ratzafratz!" | |
| 2007 | The Land Before Time | Swooper | Episode: "The Hermit of Black Rock" | |
| 2007 | Ben 10 | Band Member #1, Announcer | Episode: "Monster Weather" | |
| 2007 | Kim Possible | The Mayor | 2 episodes: "Cap'n Drakken", "Mathter and Fervent" | |
| 2007–2008 | Chowder | Singing Bean #1, Theater Manager | 3 episodes | |
| 2008–2009 | The Secret Saturdays | Piecemeal, Newscaster | 2 episodes: "Guess Who's Going to Be Dinner", "Target: Fiskerton" | |
| 2009 | Foster's Home for Imaginary Friends | Bloo Superdude | Episode: "The Bloo Superdude and the Great Creator of Everything's Awesome Ceremony of Fun" | |
| 2009–2011 | The Super Hero Squad Show | Odin, Hercules, Computer | | |
| 2009–2012 | Jungle Junction | Taxicrab | | |
| 2010–2012 | Special Agent Oso | Professor Buffo | | |
| 2011–2013 | The Cleveland Show | Tim | | |
| 2011–2013 | The Looney Tunes Show | Tosh Gopher | | |
| 2012 | Motorcity | Texas | | |
| 2012–2020 | Doc McStuffins | Chilly, Buddy, Wicked King, Fabio, Father, Pet Owners | | |
| 2012–2018 | Sofia the First | Cedric, Sir Gilliam, Woodsman | | |
| 2013 | Rick and Morty | Scary Terry | 2 episodes: "Lawnmower Dog", "Anatomy Park" | |
| 2014–2016 | Mixels | Various characters | | |
| 2014–2016 | The 7D | Grim Gloom | | |
| 2014 | Turbo: F.A.S.T | Dean Cuizeen | 2 episodes | |
| 2015 | Fresh Beat Band of Spies | Savage Strawberry | Episode: "Fruit Racer Game" | |
| 2015–2016 | TripTank | Hell's Angel, Amber Twinklez as Old Man, Mustache Cop | 3 episodes | |
| 2016–2017 | The Loud House | Pucker Uppenheimer, Sean, Billy's Dad, Bass Player | 3 episodes: "For Bros About to Rock", "Two Boys And A Baby", "Yes Man" | |
| 2016–2024 | Kulipari: An Army of Frogs | Burnu, Yabber & Sergu | Recurring roles | |
| 2016–2018 | Blaze and the Monster Machines | Bunk, Bruce Moose, Grizzly Bear 2, Worker Bee 1 | 7 episodes | |
| 2016 | Mighty Magiswords | Bag Puppets, Fud Fit | 2 episodes: "Dungeons and Dayjobs", "Champions of Breakfast" | |
| 2016–2020 | Elena of Avalor | King Hector, Chief Zephyr, King Zephyr, Jaguar King | 8 episodes: "Royal Retreat", "Flight of the Jacquins", "Realm of the Jacquins", "Shapeshifters", "Father-in-Chief", "The Incredible Shrinking Royals", "Norberg Peace Prize", "Heart of the Jaguar" | |
| 2017 | Big Mouth | Dwayne Johnson | Episode: “Am I Gay?” | |
| 2017 | Tangled: Before Ever After | Pocket | TV movie | |
| 2017 | Pickle and Peanut | Banjo-Vie | Episode: "Watchin' Darlin’/Petting Zoo" | |
| 2017–2020 | Dorothy and the Wizard of Oz | Cowardly Lion, Lyman, Crank, Schooler, Tik Tok, Witch #2, Baroness Bunchausen, Undertaker | 51 episodes | |
| 2018 | Life in Pieces | Dr. Hoot-Stein, Mouse Husband | Episode: "Reading Egg Nurse Neighbor" | |
| 2018 | Puppy Dog Pals | Reginald, Daddy Squirrel | 2 episodes: "Squirrels Just Wanna Have Fun", "The Last Pup-icorn" | |
| 2018 | DC's Legends of Tomorrow | Elvis Vocal Impersonator | Episode: "Amazing Grace" | |
| 2018 | Mickey and the Roadster Racers | Jess | Episode: "Super-Charged: Pop Star Helpers" | |
| 2019 | Tangled: The Series | Pocket, Thug #1 | Episode: "Peril on the High Seas" | |
| 2019 | Scooby-Doo and Guess Who? | Jimmy the Gardener, Ghost Of The Doom Bringer, Ghost Knight, Lawyer, Tiny, Jimmy | 3 episodes | |
| 2020–2023 | Animaniacs | Wakko Warner | | |
| 2021 | History of Swear Words | Grandpa | | |
| 2022–2023 | Batwheels | Oswald Cobblepot / Penguin | 3 episodes | |
| 2024 | Megamind Rules! | Izzy Iggy | Episode: "Too Much Chum" | |
| 2025–present | Iron Man and His Awesome Friends | Eggy Eggerson, DJ Mikey Mike | 4 episodes | |
| 2026 | Sofia the First: Royal Magic | Cedric | | |

=== Video games ===
List of voice performances in video games
| Year | Title | Role | Notes | Reference(s) |
|---|---|---|---|---|
| 1994 | Quest for Glory IV: Shadows of Darkness | Franz | | |
| 1997 | Animaniacs Game Pack | Wakko Warner | | |
| 1998 | Animaniacs: Ten Pin Alley | Wakko Warner | | |
| 1999 | Bugs Bunny: Lost in Time | Merlin 'Moyle' Munroe | | |
| 1999 | NASCAR Rumble | In-Game Commentator | | |
| 2000 | Star Wars Episode I: Jedi Power Battles | Jedi Knight Ki-Adi-Mundi | | |
| 2000 | Escape from Monkey Island | Estaban, LUA Bar Chef, Judge Tripps, Pirate 1 | | |
| 2000 | 102 Dalmatians: Puppies to the Rescue | Jean‑Pierre Le Pelt | | |
| 2000 | Star Wars: Demolition | Darth Maul, Malakili | | |
| 2001 | Star Wars: Obi-Wan | Ki-Adi Mundi | | |
| 2001 | Star Wars: Galactic Battlegrounds | Darth Maul, Gungan Bolo Trooper, Hannoon Soldier | | |
| 2001 | Crash Bandicoot: The Wrath of Cortex | Lo-Lo | | |
| 2001 | Star Wars: Starfighter Special Edition | Ric Olié, Pirate Ground Forces | | |
| 2001 | Rumble Racing | In-Game Commentator | | |
| 2002 | Star Wars: Racer Revenge | Darth Maul | | |
| 2002 | Star Wars: Obi-Wan | Gran Thug, Ki-Adi-Mundi, Wounded Naboo Soldier | | |
| 2002 | Kingdom Hearts | Dr. Finkelstein, Lock | English version | |
| 2002 | Star Wars: Jedi Knight II - Jedi Outcast | Mon Calomari Rogue Leader | | |
| 2003 | Finding Nemo | Marlin, Bruce | | |
| 2003 | Evil Dead: A Fistful of Boomstick | Male Deadites, Biker Brotherhood Member 1, Professor, Father, Confederate Survivor | Also additional voices | |
| 2003 | Star Wars: Knights of the Old Republic | Republic Soldier | | |
| 2003 | Star Wars Jedi Knight: Jedi Academy | Gran, Trandoshan | | |
| 2004 | Spyro: A Hero's Tail | Spyro, Hunter the Cheetah, Sgt. Byrd, Moneybags the Bear, Red, Astor, Magnus, Titan, Tomas | | |
| 2004 | The Nightmare Before Christmas: Oogie's Revenge | Dr. Finkelstein | | |
| 2005 | Robots | Rodney Copperbottom | | |
| 2005 | Crash Tag Team Racing | Crash Bandicoot | | |
| 2005 | Animaniacs: The Great Edgar Hunt | Wakko Warner, Big Chief Sitting Bison | | |
| 2005 | Kingdom Hearts II | Dr. Finkelstein, Lock | English version | |
| 2006 | Over the Hedge | Vincent, King Rat, Police Chief | | |
| 2007 | Shrek the Third | Pirate Captain, Peasant Actor, Evil Knight 3 | | |
| 2007 | Surf's Up | Chicken Joe | | |
| 2007 | Kingdom Hearts II: Final Mix+ | Dr. Finkelstein, Lock | English version | |
| 2007 | Crash of the Titans | Crash Bandicoot | | |
| 2007 | Biker Mice from Mars | Ronaldo Rump, Narrator, Goon | | |
| 2007 | Ratchet & Clank Future: Tools of Destruction | Smuggler, Plumber, Parrot | | |
| 2008 | Ratchet & Clank Future: Quest for Booty | Smuggler, Parrot | | |
| 2008 | Crash: Mind Over Mutant | Crash Bandicoot | | |
| 2009 | Transformers: Revenge of the Fallen | Ironhide | | |
| 2009 | The Secret of Monkey Island: Special Edition | Bill Fettuccini, Estevan – the SCUMM Bar Pirate, Pirate Leader I, Store Keeper, Sword-Head Ghost | | |
| 2009 | Ratchet & Clank Future: A Crack in Time | Smuggler, Plumber, Battery Bot | | |
| 2009 | The Secret Saturdays: Beasts of the 5th Sun | Piecemeal | | |
| 2009 | Ratchet & Clank Future: A Crank in Time | Plumber, Smuggler | | |
| 2010 | Marvel Super Hero Squad: The Infinity Gauntlet | Hercules | | |
| 2011 | Transformers: Dark of the Moon | Ironhide | | |
| 2011 | Ratchet & Clank: All 4 One | Plumber | | |
| 2011 | Kinect: Disneyland Adventures | Br'er Rabbit | | |
| 2012 | Ratchet & Clank: Full Frontal Assault | Plumber | | |
| 2013 | Skylanders: Swap Force | Blast Zone | | |
| 2013 | Ratchet & Clank: Into the Nexus | Plumber, Smuggler, Parrot | | |
| 2014 | Skylanders: Trap Team | Flip Wreck, Blast Zone | | |
| 2015 | Skylanders: SuperChargers | Flip Wreck, Blast Zone | | |
| 2015 | Heroes of the Storm | E.T.C. | | |
| 2015 | Lego Dimensions | The Cowardly Lion, Reegull | | |
| 2015 | Disney Infinity 3.0 | Marlin | Grouped under "Featuring the Voice Talents" | |
| 2016 | Ratchet & Clank | Plumber, Skid McMarx, Blarg #4 | | |
| 2016 | Skylanders: Imaginators | Crash Bandicoot, Flip Wreck, Blast Zone, Fake Crash | | |
| 2017 | Crash Bandicoot N. Sane Trilogy | Crash Bandicoot, Pinstripe Potoroo, Ripper Roo | | |
| 2019 | Crash Team Racing Nitro-Fueled | Crash Bandicoot, Baby Crash | | |
| 2021 | Crash Bandicoot: On the Run! | Crash Bandicoot | | |
| 2021 | Ratchet & Clank: Rift Apart | Skidd, Phantom | | |
| 2022 | Return to Monkey Island | LeChuck | | |
| 2023 | Sea of Thieves | LeChuck, Pirate Leader I, Store Keeper, Bill Fettuccini | | |
| 2023 | Disney Dreamlight Valley | Maui | | |
| 2024, 2026 | Disney Speedstorm | Maui, Dr. Finkelstein | Grouped under "Featuring the Voice Talents", Dr. Finkelstein voice added in Season 21 update | |

=== Live-action ===
List of acting performances in feature films and television shows
| Year | Title | Role | Notes | Reference(s) |
|---|---|---|---|---|
| 1987 | Throb | Member of The Playthings | Episode: "The Spa" | |
| 1988 | Boulevard of Broken Dreams | Benny Dimase | | |
| 2002 | The Country Bears | Long-Haired Dude | | |
| 2007 | Jekyll | Guy #1 | | |
| 2012 | Big Time Rush | Babylace | Episode: "Big Time Babysitting" | |
| 2013 | I Know That Voice | Himself | Documentary | |

=== Theme parks ===
List of voice performances in theme parks
| Year | Title | Role | Notes | Reference(s) |
|---|---|---|---|---|
| 1989, 1992 | Splash Mountain | Br'er Rabbit, Mr. Bluebird, Geese, Vultures, Owl, Alligator, Brer Turtle, Porcupine, Safety Spiels | Voice Acting Debut | |
| 1994 | Roger Rabbit's Car Toon Spin | Roger Rabbit | | |
| 2007 | Finding Nemo Submarine Voyage | Marlin | | |
| 2011 | Transformers: The Ride 3D | Ironhide | | |

=== Radio ===
List of voice performances in radio series
| Year | Title | Role | Notes | Reference(s) |
|---|---|---|---|---|
| 2001–present | Adventures in Odyssey | Wooton Bassett, Bennett Charles, Additional voices | 148 episodes | |

== Soundtrack appearances ==
| Year | Film | Role | Song | Artist/Writer | Reference(s) |
|---|---|---|---|---|---|
| 1991–95 | Taz-Mania | Theme song vocalist | "Come to Taz-Mania" | Jess Harnell & Jim Cummings | |
| 1993–99 | Animaniacs | Wakko | "Theme Song" "French Theme Song" "Sing-Along Theme" "The Monkey Song" "I Am the Very Model of a Cartoon Individual" "Wakko's America" "Be Careful What You Eat" "The Senses Song" "John Jacob Jingleheimer Schmidt" "The Twelve Days of Christmas" "Hello Nurse" "The Presidents Song" "Yakko's Universe" "Macadamia Nut" "I'm Mad" "Variety Speak" "The Anvil Song" "At the Big Wrap Party Tonight" "The Ballad of Magellan" "Bones in the Body" "The Etiquette Song" "Hungarian Rapsody" "I'll Take an Island" "I'm Cute" "I've Got a Ha'Penny" "If I Could Have My Wish Then I'd Be Happy" "L.A. Dot" "Lake Titicaca" "Make a Gookie" "Noel" "Let the Anvils Ring" "Our First Day of School" "Never Give Up Hope" "A Quake! A Quake!" "Schnitzelbank" "Several Drops of Rain" "The Studio Shrink" "There's Only One of You" "Traveling Animaniacs" "Twinkle, Twinkle" "U.N. Me" "Video Revue" "What Are We" "When You're Traveling" "The Wishing Star" "Yes, Brothers Warner We" | Richard Stone, Steve Bernstein, Julie Bernstein & Gordon Goodwin | |
| 1996 | Aladdin and the King of Thieves | Additional voices | "Are You In or Out?" | David Friedman | |
| 1997-98 | Pepper Ann | Mik Snott Band Member/various voices | Multiple episodes | Disney Toonimation Studios | |
| 2001 | Lady and the Tramp II: Scamp's Adventure | Buster | "Junkyard Society Rag" | Melissa Manchester & Norman Gimbel | |
| 2004 | The Powerpuff Girls | Additional voices | "Give Something to Me" "Sai Lai lufti de santra mekidu" "Sunshine, Sunshine, Down on Me" "Thank You" "This is the Best Day of My Life Today" "Real Good" "Sai Lai lufti de santra mekidu 2" | Manda Rin, Steven Clark, John Disco, James L. Venable, Thomas Chase & Stephen Rucker | |
| 2005 | The Nightmare Before Christmas: Oogie's Revenge | Dr. Finkelstein | "Dr. Finklestein's Song" | Danny Elfman | |
| 2006 | Codename: Kids Next Door | Singer | "Don't Pee in Your Pants If You Wanna Victory Dance" | | |
| 2008 | Chowder | Singer | "Fireheart" | | |
| 2009 | Foster's Home for Imaginary Friends | Singer | "The Bloo supersede and the Great Creator of Everything's Awesome Ceremony of Fun That He's Not Invited To" | | |
| 2011–14 | The Looney Tunes Show | Tosh Gopher | "Be Polite" "You Like / I Like" "Drifting Apart" "Christmas Rules" | Andy Sturmer | |
| 2012 | Doc McStuffins | Chilly | "You Can Do It" "Chillin' in the Snow" | Michelle Lewis & Kay Hanley | |
| 2013 | Sofia the First | Cedric | All | | |
| 2014 | Special Agent Oso | Professor Buffo | "The Doc with the Golden Bed" | | |
| 2019 | Muppet Babies | | "Kick It Up A Notch" | | |
| 2021 | History of Swear Words | | "TBA" | | |

| Preceded by Gary Owens | Announcer for America's Funniest Home Videos; 1998–present | Succeeded by incumbent |
| Preceded by Tom Kenny | Voice of Spyro the Dragon; 2004–2005 | Succeeded by Elijah Wood |
| Preceded by Steve Blum | Voice of Crash Bandicoot; 2005–2020 | Succeeded by Scott Whyte |
| Preceded by Matt Hill | Voice of Ironhide; 2007 | Succeeded by Corey Burton |
| Preceded by Corey Burton | Voice of Ironhide; 2009 | Succeeded by Keith Szarabajka |
| Preceded by Keith Szarabajka | Voice of Ironhide; 2011 | Succeeded by Current |
