= NASCAR Rumble =

2000 racing video game

- Cover art featuring the cars of Tony Stewart and Jack Sprague
- Developer: EA Redwood Shores
- Publisher: Electronic Arts
- Series: EA Sports NASCAR
- Platform: PlayStation
- Release: NA: February 3, 2000
- Genre: Racing
- Modes: Single-player, multiplayer

NASCAR Rumble is a racing video game created by Electronic Arts for the PlayStation. The player races through 18 courses set in six different areas collecting power-ups along the way. The game is a departure from many NASCAR games, as it is an arcade racer featuring various tracks and power-ups. A non-NASCAR licensed sequel was made for the PlayStation 2, called Rumble Racing. There are drivers from the then Winston Cup Series and Craftsman Truck Series, as well as legend racers and bonus vehicles.

== Gameplay ==
In NASCAR Rumble, the main objective is to win a race or series of races against one to five opponents. They race in normal or souped-up stock cars from the at-the-time NASCAR Winston Cup Series (including Adam Petty, who uses his NASCAR Busch Series car, as he had yet to debut in Winston Cup in 1999), in addition to several Craftsman Truck Series drivers (all from their respective 1999 season), unlockable past NASCAR legends (each of them using Dodge Charger Daytona bodies), and bonus vehicles. Another feature is the voice of Animaniacs voice actor Jess Harnell, who talks to the player during a race. The game also includes three original songs by guitarist Derek Trucks.

== Game modes ==
=== Single race ===
In the single race game mode, the player can select any track to race on. The player can also choose between one and eight circuits and one to five opponents. The option to select AI opponent(s) is also available if enabled in the options.

=== Championship ===
In the championship game mode, the player can participate in a championship consisting of three rounds, each set on a track sharing the location. Depending on how well the player does in each race, they are rewarded with ten points for a win, eight for second, six for third, four for fourth, two for fifth, and one for sixth. A running total is kept, and the final standing position is based on the total points earned in all three races. If the player finishes in first, they receive a trophy and unlock the legend championship in that series.

Championships can also be played in "Cyberteam" mode where there are three teams with two players on each. The team members combine their points and the standings are based on both members. There is also "co-op" mode, where two human players are on a team.

There is also a "Legend" mode, where the player can unlock a legendary NASCAR driver in a championship against the legend and four "regular" drivers. The player must finish first in the championship to win, regardless of the legend's final position in the standings.

=== Showdown ===
"Showdown" is a one-lap shootout against an opponent of the player's choice. The player also chooses the track and power-up density.

=== Time trial ===
In a time trial, the player has four laps to obtain the track and/or lap record. Track records are "official" if only four laps are run, regardless of power-up density. There are a maximum of five track records kept for each track, but only one lap record.

== Reception ==
Reception

Aggregate score
Aggregator	Score
GameRankings	81%

Review scores
Publication	Score
AllGame	4/5
CNET Gamecenter	8/10
Electronic Gaming Monthly	7.25/10 (Note: Four critics of Electronic Gaming Monthly gave the game each a score of 7.5/10, 6.5/10, 8/10, and 7/10.)
EP Daily	7/10
Game Informer	7.75/10
GameFan	81% (Note: In GameFan's viewpoint of the game, one critic gave it a score of 85, and the other 77.)
GameRevolution	B−
GameSpot	6.9/10
IGN	8/10
Next Generation	4/5
Official U.S. PlayStation Magazine	3.5/5

The game received favorable reviews according to the review aggregation website GameRankings. Eric Bratcher of NextGen said, "Don't expect an ultra-realistic racing simulation here. It's more like the NASCAR-licensed version of Road Rash. And it's great."

Dan Elektro of GamePro said, "Yes, it's closer to Hot Wheels Turbo Racing than NASCAR 2000, but no matter. NASCAR Rumble's silly spin on the usual stock car showdown is a wild and welcome shift into high gear." (Note: GamePro gave the game two 4.5/5 scores for graphics and control, and two 5/5 scores for sound and fun factor in one review.) In another GamePro review, however, Scary Larry said, "In the long list of impressive PlayStation racing games, NASCAR Rumble is definitely in the funny car competition." (Note: GamePro gave the game two 3.5/5 scores for graphics and sound, and two 4/5 scores for control and fun factor in another review.)
