= List of Animaniacs (2020 TV series) episodes =

The following is a list of episodes from the 2020 series Animaniacs, which is produced by Warner Bros. Animation for Hulu. It is a reboot of the 1993–98 animated television series of the same name created by Tom Ruegger. The series was released on Hulu on November 20, 2020 and ended on February 17, 2023.

During the course of the series, 36 episodes of Animaniacs aired over three seasons.

== Series overview ==
Season	Segments	Episodes	Originally released
1	42	13	November 20, 2020
2	44	13	November 5, 2021
3	37	10	February 17, 2023

== Episodes ==
The segments in the list are labeled by the starring character(s) as follows:

- (Y) = Yakko, Wakko and Dot (72 segments)
- (P) = Pinky and the Brain (34 segments)
- (St) = Starbox and Cindy (5 segments)
- (Gn) = The Incredible Gnome in People's Mouths (2 segments)
- (S) = Slappy Squirrel (1 segment)
- (O) = One-shots (6 segments)

=== Season 1 (2020) ===
No. overall	No. in season	Title	Directed by	Written by	Original release date
1	1	"Jurassic Lark" (Y)	Scott O'Brien	Lucas Crandles and Timothy Nash	November 19, 2020 (Note: This episode was aired during a Twitter Live event on the Animaniacs Twitter account on November 19, 2020, ahead of the premiere of the first season.)
1	1	"Suspended Animation (Part 1)" (Y)	Scott O'Brien and Katie Rice	Jess Lacher and Andrew Barbot	November 19, 2020
1	1	"Of Mice and Memes" (P)	Scott O'Brien	Kathleen Chen and Brian Polk	November 19, 2020
1	1	"Suspended Animation (Part 2)" (Y)	Scott O'Brien and Katie Rice	Kathleen Chen and Brian Polk	November 19, 2020
Cold open: Steven Spielberg reintroduces the "reanimated" Animaniacs with a spoof of one of his most famous films.; After 22 years of being off the air, the Warners return to the Warner Bros. studio and see all the new changes that happened while they were gone. After singing about everything that happened in the past 22 years, the Warners are amazed by the new changes. The Warners also find out lots of old shows have been rebooted and decide to sing a song about current reboots and the practice of rebooting. Despite this, they believe that reboots are shameful and think that it won't work for them, just before they get a sellout check from Hulu for the revival. The Warners then agree to enjoy their new life while it lasts.; Seeing that people like watching funny videos, Brain tries to create a meme with a hypnotic mind-control filter to take over the world.
2	2	"Warners Unbound" (Y)	Katie Rice and Adriel Garcia	Jess Lacher and Andrew Barbot	November 20, 2020
2	2	"How to Brain Your Dragon" (P)	Katie Rice and Adriel Garcia	Greg White and Wellesley Wild	November 20, 2020
2	2	"Suffragette City" (Y)	Katie Rice	Jess Lacher and Andrew Barbot	November 20, 2020
The Warners play Greek gods and put Odysseus through the wringer after he ruins their relaxation from punishing people.; In medieval times, Brain tries to conquer the kingdom by defeating a dragon, only to find the dragon, named Benedict, is benevolent and passionate of the arts.; On the anniversary of the 19th Amendment, Dot takes on Washington to ensure that cartoon characters have the right to vote.
3	3	"Gold Meddlers" (Y)	Brett Varon	Greg White and Wellesley Wild	November 20, 2020
3	3	"Pinko and the Brain" (P)	Brett Varon and Katie Rice	Story by : Jess Lacher and Andrew Barbot; Teleplay by : Kathleen Chen, Brian Polk and Wellesley Wild	November 20, 2020
3	3	"Math-terpiece Theater: Apples" (Y)	Adriel Garcia	Jess Lacher	November 20, 2020
The Warners accidentally camp out in the Olympic Games, where they compete against egotistical athlete Nils Neidhart, believing that the medals are chocolate in gold wrapping, as Wakko had forgot to bring some to make s'mores.; In 1953, Brain disguises himself as a politician and attempts to blackmail all the others to ensure he is the only one remaining.; Dot dramatically teaches a math lesson involving apples and a thief named Nancy.
4	4	"Bun Control" (Y)	Scott O'Brien and Adriel Garcia	Jess Lacher and Andrew Barbot	November 20, 2020
4	4	"Ex-Mousina" (P)	Scott O'Brien	Greg White, Lucas Crandles and Timothy Nash	November 20, 2020
4	4	"Bloopf" (Y)	Erik Knutson	Kathleen Chen and Brian Polk	November 20, 2020
The Warners deal with a bunny infestation on the studio lot, brought forth by their new neighbor, rabbit breeder Dwayne LaPistol.; Brain invents a robot "son," to help him take over the world, but it doesn't agree with Brain's plans, and it later turns on him as he sees him and Pinky obstacles in his way of taking over the world.; The Warners debut a new app called Bloopf that makes videos that are one-tenth of a second, only for the app to get acquired by Spooder, an app that delivers content with blinding lights and sounds only dogs can hear.
5	5	"Good Warner Hunting" (Y)	Katie Rice	Lucas Crandles and Timothy Nash	November 20, 2020
5	5	"No Brainer" (P)	Katie Rice	Kathleen Chen and Brian Polk	November 20, 2020
5	5	"Ralph Cam" (Y)	Katie Rice, Dave Thomas and Adriel Garcia	Jordan Vandina	November 20, 2020
The Warners are stalked by a deranged hunter obsessed with collecting the characters of the original series.; Pinky and Brain break into the National Security Agency to retrieve a phone message containing their latest plan to take over the world after Brain develops short-term amnesia from a car crash and cannot remember it.; Shown from a security camera, the Warners play a Halloween prank on Ralph whilst he's sleeping.
6	6	"The Cutening" (Y)	Brett Varon	Jess Lacher and Andrew Barbot	November 20, 2020
6	6	"Close Encounters of the Worst Kind" (P)	Brett Varon	Greg White, Jess Lacher and Andrew Barbot	November 20, 2020
6	6	"Equal Time" (Y)	Brett Varon	Jess Lacher, Andrew Barbot and Wellesley Wild	November 20, 2020
After a disgusted morning, Dot gets out and eats a super-cute cupcake, turning into a super-cute version of herself and gaining the ability to turn everything super-cute, which goes horribly wrong after 28 days of it.; Pinky and Brain attempt to gain the attention of alien life to have the aliens help them take over the world, only to find the aliens they summoned are uninterested with taking over the world and were attracted by Pinky's song that he had taped over the message. (Note: The original episode included what was intended to be a fake phone number, but was actually a real phone number for a phone sex line. Hulu pulled the episode temporarily twice to remove and replace the number with a fictional phone number.); The Warners present various ads for third-party candidates, which ends horribly wrong as Russians take over the campaign with an ad showing a drone as a presidential candidate, and somehow swap out Wakko with said drone.
7	7	"Warner She Wrote" (Y)	Erik Knutson	Story by : Kathleen Chen and Brian Polk; Teleplay by : Jess Lacher, Andrew Barbot and Wellesley Wild	November 20, 2020
7	7	"France France Revolution" (Y)	Scott O'Brien and Adriel Garcia	Story by : Andrew Barbot; Teleplay by : Kathleen Chen and Brian Polk	November 20, 2020
7	7	"Gift Rapper" (Y)	Scott O'Brien	Lucas Crandles and Timothy Nash	November 20, 2020
While the Warners are traveling on the Occident Express, Detective Hercule Yakko attempts to solve a dognapping.; In 18th-century France, the Warners accidentally start the French Revolution while trying to stop their own hunger. After unintentionally convincing Marie Antoinette to say her rumored phrase, "Let them eat cake," the Warners, in the style of a game show, put Antoniette on house arrest in her palace until the monarchy is abolished and she is slated for execution at the Revolutionary Tribunal.; While preparing for another adventure, the Warners end up on a set for rapper Jay-Pac Le East's new music video; when Jay-Pac claims to be better than William Shakespeare, Yakko is prompted to school him in the hip-hop ways of the Bard. Pinky and the Brain cameo at the end of the segment to make up for the lack of a segment for them in this episode.
8	8	"WhoDonut" (Y)	Katie Rice	Greg White, Jess Lacher, and Andrew Barbot	November 20, 2020
8	8	"Mousechurian Candidate" (P)	Katie Rice	Story by : Jess Lacher and Andrew Barbot; Teleplay by : Kathleen Chen and Brian Polk	November 20, 2020
8	8	"Starbox and Cindy" (St)	Katie Rice	Jess Lacher	November 20, 2020
Wakko attempts to find out who ate his donuts.; Brain runs for president and genetically alters a female mouse named Julia to be the ideal First Lady.; Minuscule alien invader Starbox attempts to escape the grasp of a little girl named Cindy so he can send the signal for an invasion of Earth.
9	9	"Here Comes Treble" (Y)	Brett Varon	Kathleen Chen and Brian Polk	November 20, 2020
9	9	"That's Not the Issue" (Y)	Brett Varon	Story by : Ben Warheit; Teleplay by : Brad DePrima	November 20, 2020
9	9	"Future Brain" (P)	Brett Varon	Kathleen Chen and Brian Polk	November 20, 2020
9	9	"The Incredible Gnome in People's Mouths" (Gn)	Adriel Garcia and Brett Varon	Andrew Barbot, Jess Lacher and Wellesley Wild	November 20, 2020
While performing a sketch, the Warners butt heads with the music conductor, after the conductor insults the Warners, who are frustrated with doing multiple takes from wrong notes.; The Warners appear on a Fox News parody and get on the host Tuck Buckerson's nerves.; While Pinky and Brain head to the Academy Awards to ensure Brain's nominated film, a parody of A Beautiful Mind wins, Brain's future self arrives to aid him.; A man is transformed into a gnome and makes a living by hiding in people's mouths to speak for them, usually with disastrous results.
10	10	"Anima-Nyet" (Y)	Scott O'Brien	Lucas Crandles, Timothy Nash and Wellesley Wild	November 20, 2020
10	10	"Babysitter's Flub" (P)	Scott O'Brien	Kathleen Chen and Brian Polk	November 20, 2020
10	10	"The Warners' Press Conference" (Y)	Adriel Garcia	Jess Lacher, Ted Mulkerin and Wellesley Wild	November 20, 2020
After discovering a Russian bootleg version of their show used as pro-Putin propaganda with horrible acting, the Warners head to Russia to complain.; Brain must battle a toddler who has eaten a superpower-granting meteorite that consists of the rarest element in the world that is necessary for his latest plan to take over the world.; The Warners have a press conference about the episode, which ends with Dot trying to give hints about season 2, to which the studio is furious with the press for trying to uncover classified information.
11	11	"Phantomaniacs" (Y)	Katie Rice	Wellesley Wild	November 20, 2020
11	11	"Fear and Laughter in Burbank" (Y)	Katie Rice	Greg White, Kathleen Chen and Brian Polk	November 20, 2020
11	11	"Bride of Pinky" (P)	Katie Rice	Greg White and Wellesley Wild	November 20, 2020
11	11	"Things That Go Bump in the Night" (O)	Katie Rice	Kathleen Chen and Brian Polk	November 20, 2020
Cold open: The Warners haunt a television set in a parody of Poltergeist.; In a parody of It, the trick-or-treating Warners encounter and torment a spooky clown named Nickelwise, who tries and fails to capture their souls.; In a parody of Frankenstein, Brain fashions a monster to frighten a village into submission, but the monster and Pinky fall in love.; A group of monsters are huddled together in one pitch-black space.
12	12	"A Zit!" (Y)	Brett Varon	Timothy Nash and Lucas Crandles	November 20, 2020
12	12	"1001 Narfs" (P)	Brett Varon	Kathleen Chen and Brian Polk	November 20, 2020
12	12	"Manny Manspreader" (Y)	Brett Varon	Jess Lacher and Andrew Barbot	November 20, 2020
Dot is horrified when she discovers a zit on her face, only to find that her zit has feelings and aspirations himself, despite zits like him only living for a mere week.; In medieval Baghdad, Pinky and Brain attempt to steal the Sultana's stallions to take over the world, but end up telling stories to entertain her in a parody of One Thousand and One Nights.; While out to see a film, Yakko, Wakko, and Dot deal with a manspreader, whose lack of sense regarding personal space proves to be quite a nuisance. After seeing the film, the Warners head for home on the bus, but are confronted by the same manspreader again.
13	13	"Hindenburg Cola" (Y)	Erik Knutson	Story by : Eric Branscum; Teleplay by : Lucas Crandles and Timothy Nash	November 20, 2020
13	13	"Roadent Trip" (P)	Scott O'Brien	Story by : Joe Saunders; Teleplay by : Lucas Crandles and Timothy Nash	November 20, 2020
13	13	"FLOTUS, FLOTUS, What Do You Know About Us?" (Y)	Adriel Garcia and Dave Thomas	Jess Lacher	November 20, 2020
The Warners go to find a can of the rare soda Hindenburg Cola for an ailing Dr. Scratchansniff. For that, they have to outsmart Nils Neidhart, who is after the soda as well.; Brain constructs a self-driving car which he will use to trap whoever is inside, but ends up getting trapped inside it after leaving the remote to release them outside the car.; Dot sings about First Ladies throughout history, but must frantically rush through the second half of the song due to time constraints with Yakko and Wakko's help. While Dot manages to scrape through, she ends up forgetting Bess Truman in the process.

=== Season 2 (2021) ===
No. overall	No. in season	Title	Directed by	Written by	Original release date
14	1	"Rome Sweet Rome" (Y)	Katie Rice	Lucas Crandles and Timothy Nash	November 5, 2021
14	1	"Backwards Pinky" (P)	Katie Rice	Kathleen Chen and Brian Polk	November 5, 2021
14	1	"Wakko's Short Shorts: Now Loading" (Y)	Brett Varon	Timothy Nash and Lucas Crandles	November 5, 2021
In Ancient Rome, the Warners tangle with Emperor Nero.; Pinky and Brain attempt to use Brain's teleportation machine to travel to the National Museum of Natural History to steal the Hope Diamond, but Pinky accidentally causes the machine to malfunction by bringing his phone with him, causing them to become conjoined together. They must find a way to return to normal before their minds merge as well.; Wakko waits endlessly for his new video game app to load.
15	2	"Please Submit" (Y)	Brett Varon	Kathleen Chen and Brian Polk	November 5, 2021
15	2	"The Flawed Couple" (P)	Adriel Garcia	James Butler	November 5, 2021
15	2	"Everyday Safety" (Y)	Brett Varon	Wellesley Wild and Ted Mulkerin	November 5, 2021
The Warners are attempting to sign on to a suggestion page until a pop-up shows they need to sign in the email. Not wanting to, they ignore it until the pop-up comes to life and annoys them until they finally give in and put their email in. However, multiple blue envelopes of spam attack them and after running into a graveyard, the spam shreds Wakko, runs over Dot with a car, and buries Yakko alive, in the same manner they had done to the pop-up. The segment ends with the now fine Warner siblings saying that spam is a serious threat and that the only safe website is their own.; With Pinky and Brain missing, Nora must fill the time slot by showing failed, never before seen Pinky and the Brain pilots. After showing a few pilots that parody old sitcoms, Nora learns that Brain and Pinky have been found. However, unbeknownst to Nora, it is actually clones of them, who decided to no longer do their show, and have created a cloning machine to help them fool the public while they truly pursue world domination. Unfortunately, the clones do not perfectly match their personalities and melt, and Pinky accidentally destroys the cloning machine when he breaks the switch, forcing them to return to comply with the producers' orders.; In a parody of 1980s safety videos, the Warners give advice on how to survive a tsunami of hot maple syrup.
16	3	"Rug of War" (Y)	Erik Knutson	Kathleen Chen and Brian Polk	November 5, 2021
16	3	"Run Pinky Run" (P)	Erik Knutson	James Butler and Brad Deprima	November 5, 2021
16	3	"The Hamburg Tickler" (Y)	Erik Knutson	Kathleen Chen and Brian Polk	November 5, 2021
After winning the contents of a storage locker in an auction, the Warners find the Bayeux Tapestry and travel inside it.; In a parody of Run Lola Run, Pinky must acquire $100,000 to save Brain, who is being held hostage after the bag with the money he was going to use to buy a rare isotope to power his latest invention is mistakenly switched with a bag belonging to an old lady.; Dr. Scratchansniff tells the Warners a legend about a monster who kidnaps liars in an attempt to discourage them from lying after they continually do online shopping with his phone. After it convinces the Warners to give all their stuff back, it is revealed that the legend was a made-up story Scratchnsniff and Nora made to trick the Warners into giving everything back, but to their shock, the monster is revealed to be real and chases them away.
17	4	"Ralph World"	Katie Rice	Wellesley Wild	November 5, 2021 (Note: This episode was aired during a Twitter Live on the Animaniacs Twitter account on November 4, 2021, ahead of the premiere of the second season.)
17	4	"My Super Sour Sixteen" (Y)	Katie Rice	Kathleen Chen, Brian Polk, Jordan Vandina and Wellesley Wild	November 5, 2021
17	4	"How to: Brain Takes Over the World" (P)	Katie Rice	James Butler and Brad DePrima	November 5, 2021
Cold open: A spoof of the opening to HBO's Westworld, featuring Ralph "under construction".; Nora recruits the Warners to sing at her daughter Cora's 16th birthday party in exchange for fixing their leaky tower after Cora's favorite boy band bailed last minute.; Pinky does a "how-to" livestream of Brain's latest plan to manipulate lottery balls to gain money for a deep water drill that Brain will use to disrupt tectonic plates.
18	5	"The Warners Are Present" (Y)	Brett Varon	Kathleen Chen and Brian Polk	November 5, 2021
18	5	"The Pinktator" (P)	Brett Varon	Brad DePrima	November 5, 2021
18	5	"Know Your Scroll" (Y)	Brett Varon	James Butler	November 5, 2021
While at an art museum, the Warners cross paths with a performance artist who sits on a chair and stares at visitors without responding.; Brain attempts to go undercover at a dinner party for world dictators to plant a listening device to gain access to their intel.; When the company picnic is cancelled due to the rain, the Warners try to find something to watch on a streaming service.
19	6	"Yakko's Big Idea" (Y)	Erik Knutson	Lucas Crandles and Timothy Nash	November 5, 2021
19	6	"Mouse Congeniality" (P)	Erik Knutson	Timothy Nash and Lucas Crandles	November 5, 2021
19	6	"Rejected Animaniacs Characters" (Y)	Erik Knutson	Wellesley Wild, Ted Mulkerin and Jordan Vandina	November 5, 2021
After watching a parody of Shark Tank, Yakko bets to his siblings he can pitch a better idea for a new invention.; Brain has Pinky enter into the "Miss Everything Pageant," which is being held in the same building as a summit of world leaders, so Brain may infiltrate and spray them with a potent nerve agent that will render them susceptible to his commands. However, his plan fails when he switches it with Pinky's perfume by mistake.; The Warners revisit some rejected Animaniacs segments.
20	7	"Yakko Amakko" (Y)	Brett Varon	Lucas Crandles and Timothy Nash	November 5, 2021
20	7	"The Longest Word" (Y)	Katie Rice	Kathleen Chen and Brian Polk	November 5, 2021
20	7	"Happy Narfday!" (P)	Katie Rice	James Butler	November 5, 2021
20	7	"Magna Cartoon" (Y)	Katie Rice	Lucas Crandles and Timothy Nash	November 5, 2021
Yakko is tormented by a mischievous animator in a homage to Duck Amuck and Rabbit Rampage.; The Warners each explain what they believe to be the longest word in the English language while clashing over teaching styles.; Brain is forced to celebrate Pinky's birthday, the one day a year they do not try to take over the world, but when he finds a key ingredient for a plan, he must keep it a secret from Pinky while trying not to get it damaged.; The Warners sing a song about Magna Carta while tormenting King John of England.
21	8	"Wakkiver Twist (Part One)" (Y)	Brett Varon	Lucas Crandles and Timothy Nash	November 5, 2021
21	8	"Plight of Hand" (P)	Brett Varon	Kathleen Chen, Brian Polk and Wellesley Wild	November 5, 2021
21	8	"Wakkiver Twist (Part Two)" (Y)	Brett Varon	Lucas Crandles and Timothy Nash	November 5, 2021
In a two-part parody of Oliver Twist, the Warners reluctantly join a gang of juvenile delinquents led by the villainous Faginsniff (played by Dr. Scratchansniff), but end up betraying him and getting him arrested after being discovered during a heist and put on trial.; After being zapped with one of Brain's inventions, Pinky's hands are given a mind of their own.
22	9	"What Is That?" (Y)	Erik Knutson	Ted Mulkerin and Wellesley Wild	November 5, 2021
22	9	"Mouse Madness" (P)	Erik Knutson	Lucas Crandles and Timothy Nash	November 5, 2021
22	9	"Christopher Columbusted" (Y)	Erik Knutson	Timothy Nash and Lucas Crandles	November 5, 2021
22	9	"Fake Medicines" (Y)	Brett Varon	Wellesley Wild, Kathleen Chen and Brian Polk	November 5, 2021
The Warners find an object and try to figure out what it is.; Brain uses a device to go back in time to accurately bet on the outcomes of basketball games, to raise enough money to buy an island lair, but ends up breaking the fabric of reality.; The Warners journey with Christopher Columbus, whilst mocking him for continuously failing to reach Asia.; Yakko and Dot review the side effects of Wakko's new prescription medication.
23	10	"Exercise Minute" (Y)	Brett Varon	Wellesley Wild, Kathleen Chen and Brian Polk	November 5, 2021
23	10	"Reichenbrain Falls" (P)	Katie Rice	Kathleen Chen and Brian Polk	November 5, 2021
23	10	"Targeted Ads" (Y)	Brett Varon	Wellesley Wild and Ted Mulkerin	November 5, 2021
23	10	"Bath Time" (St)	Katie Rice	Greg White, Jess Lacher and Andrew Barbot	November 5, 2021
Cold open: The Warners lead a mandatory exercise break.; In a sequel to Season 1's segment "Mousechurian Candidate," Brain attempts to infiltrate the International Space Station to turn it into a weapon, but is foiled by an old adversary.; Yakko presents some targeted ads to the viewers.; Starbox attempts to escape Cindy's clutches during bath time.
24	11	"A Brief History of History" (Y)	Erik Knutson	Lucas Crandles and Timothy Nash	November 5, 2021
24	11	"Gerard" (Gn)	Erik Knutson	Jess Lacher	November 5, 2021
24	11	"The Prisoners Dilemma" (P)	Katie Rice	Kathleen Chen and Brian Polk	November 5, 2021
24	11	"Math-terpiece Theater: Beach Balls" (Y)	Brett Varon	Jess Lacher	November 5, 2021
Yakko explains the history of the world to a race of aliens.; The Gnome helps a senior citizen stand up for himself when his pudding is stolen.; Pinky and Brain are kidnapped and taken to an island to aid a group of supervillains in their plan, but all of them are accidentally killed by Pinky's antics, which the leader, the only survivor, chooses Pinky as his weapon, only to end up being a victim of Pinky's idiocy as well.; Dot teaches a dramatic math lesson involving beach balls.
25	12	"Warner's Ark" (Y)	Brett Varon	Jess Lacher	November 5, 2021
25	12	"The Apology" (Y)	Brett Varon	Kathleen Chen, Brian Polk and Wellesley Wild	November 5, 2021
25	12	"Narf Over Troubled Water" (P)	Katie Rice	Kathleen Chen and Brian Polk	November 5, 2021
25	12	"The Warner's Vault" (Y)	Katie Rice	Wellesley Wild and Jess Lacher	November 5, 2021
During the time of Noah's Ark, the Warners pick up a bunch of stranded mythical creatures on their own ark.; The Warners make a video to apologize to their viewers, but cannot remember what it is they did.; In 1965, Pinky and Brain attempt to create a chart-topping song, so they will be invited onto The Ed Sullivan Show, where Brain will use a special bowtie to neutralize the fathers of America, leaving the youth to turn to him for paternal guidance. It fails when Pinky becomes more popular than Brain and when Brain realizes (to his shock) that the show has switched to TV color.; The Warners go into the Warner Bros. Studio Vault to revisit some of their old cartoons.
26	13	"80's Cats" (Y)	Katie Rice	Wellesley Wild and Ted Mulkerin	November 5, 2021
26	13	"All About the Benjamin" (Y)	Katie Rice	Matt Pabian	November 5, 2021
26	13	"23 and WB" (Y)	Katie Rice and Adriel Garcia	Kathleen Chen and Brian Polk	November 5, 2021
Cold open: The Warners star in a parody of the opening of the 1985 cartoon ThunderCats.; In the 1700s, the Warners work as apprentices to Benjamin Franklin, who takes their ideas for himself and passes them off as his own.; After taking a DNA test, the Warners discover they are related to Nora. However, in the end, it is revealed that their DNA tests were accidentally swapped with Ralph's, who is revealed to be related to Nora instead. Ralph is then promoted to Chairman by Nora's grandmother, leaving Yakko, Wakko, and Dot to question the fate of the company as well as the fate of their own lives.

=== Season 3 (2023) ===
No. overall	No. in season	Title	Directed by	Written by	Original release date
27	1	"Previously On" (Y)	Brett Varon	Lucas Crandles and Timothy Nash	February 17, 2023
27	1	"Season Three and WB (Part 1)" (Y)	Brett Varon	Lucas Crandles and Timothy Nash	February 17, 2023
27	1	"How to: Friendship" (P)	Brett Varon	Justin Butler and Brad DePrima	February 17, 2023
27	1	"Season Three and WB (Part 2)" (Y)	Brett Varon	Lucas Crandles and Timothy Nash	February 17, 2023
Cold open: A recap of the Season 2 finale is presented.; Continuing after the Season 2 finale, with Ralph still acting as CEO of WB, Nora, fed up with Ralph's creative decisions and her grandmother's support of Ralph, quits her job but returns as the new security guard and proves more efficient at catching the Warners, even giving them prison uniforms. The Warners then make a deal with Nora to help get her job as CEO back in exchange for releasing them. Ralph then prepares a test screening of WB's new film until the Warners steal his lunch, causing Ralph to return to his old self and chase them around the studio. After Nora saves her grandmother from the chaos, she gives the CEO job back to her while Nora, out of guilt, gives Ralph his old job back.; Pinky makes another "how-to" video about the importance of his and Brain's friendship, ruining Brain's latest plan in the process.
28	2	"Soda-pressed" (Y)	Katie Rice	Kathleen Chen and Brian Polk	February 17, 2023
28	2	"A Starbox is Born" (St)	Katie Rice	Jess Lacher	February 17, 2023
28	2	"Royal Flush" (P)	Katie Rice	Kathleen Chen and Brian Polk	February 17, 2023
The Warners teach a kid-fluencer the importance of having fun and not growing up too fast.; Cindy makes Starbox the star of her own puppet show.; Brain plans to rig a high stakes poker game to become the new King of England.
29	3	"Planet Warner" (Y)	Brett Varon and Katie Rice	Lucas Crandles and Timothy Nash	February 17, 2023
29	3	"Talladega Mice: The Ballad of Pinky Brainy" (P)	Matt Yang	Brad DePrima	February 17, 2023
29	3	"D.I.WHY?" (Y)	Matt Yang	Kathleen Chen and Brian Polk	February 17, 2023
A documentary narrator takes us through a day on the Warner Bros. lot.; Brain and Pinky break into the ACME Institute of Technology in order to steal a miniature car that they will use to rob Fort Knox. Trouble rises when they learn the car functionality is linked to the driver's stress level, and Pinky, who is in the driver's seat, cannot switch seats with Brain.; The Warners sing a song about the fun of DIY home improvement activities.
30	4	"Fantasy" (Y) (P)	Brett Varon	Kathleen Chen, Brian Polk and Wellesley Wild	February 17, 2023
30	4	"Über Nachtmare" (Y)	Brett Varon	Brad DePrima	February 17, 2023
30	4	"Mad Mouse: Furry Road" (P)	Brett Varon	Kathleen Chen and Brian Polk	February 17, 2023
Cold open: Pinky, Brain and the Warners experience a fantastical version of the lot.; While on his way for a speech at the Psychiatrist Awards, Dr. Scratchansniff accidentally orders a carpool version on a rideshare app, forcing him to ride with the Warners, who are also going on the car for their own intentions.; Pinky and Brain head to a desert music festival to test Brain's latest plan for world domination.
31	5	"Teeniacs" (Y)	Katie Rice	Kathleen Chen, Brian Polk and Jordan Vandina	February 17, 2023
31	5	"Dog Days" (St)	Katie Rice	Jess Lacher	February 17, 2023
31	5	"Groundmouse Day" (P)	Katie Rice	Timothy Nash and Lucas Crandles	February 17, 2023
Cold open: The Warners are part of an overdramatic YA show.; Starbox not only has to deal with Cindy, but also a dog.; In a parody of Groundhog Day, while Brain is attempting take over the world on Groundhog Day, he and Pinky find that they are somehow stuck in a time loop where the same day keeps repeating, and Brain uses it to his advantage to ensure his plan didn't fail.
32	6	"Animaliens" (Y)	Matt Yang	Lucas Crandles, Timothy Nash and Wellesley Wild	February 17, 2023
32	6	"Murder Pals" (O)	Katie Rice	Story by : Katie Rice; Teleplay by : James Butler	February 17, 2023
32	6	"Groundmouse Day Again" (P)	Matt Yang	Timothy Nash and Lucas Crandles	February 17, 2023
32	6	"Island of Dr. Warnerau" (Y)	Matt Yang	Kathleen Chen and Brian Polk	February 17, 2023
Cold open: Ralph, Nora and Scratchansniff encounter alien versions of the Warners.; A Lassie-type dog murders her owners.; Continuing the plot from last episode, Brain has managed to finally take over the world, but the time loop is still active, and despite many attempts, Brain continuously tries & fails to break the time loop, until he finds that Pinky had been using his time machine prototype as a white noise machine, and destroys it.; While going whale watching, the Warners find themselves stranded on a remote island inhabited by creatures that slightly resemble them created by Scratchansniff's twin brother, Jürgen.
33	7	"Global Warnering" (Y)	Brett Varon	Brad DePrima	February 17, 2023
33	7	"Lawn in Sixty Seconds" (O)	Brett Varon	Kathleen Chen and Brian Polk	February 17, 2023
33	7	"All's Fair in Love and Door" (P)	Brett Varon	Kathleen Chen and Brian Polk	February 17, 2023
33	7	"Cute Things That Can Kill You" (O)	Katie Rice	Story by : Katie Rice; Teleplay by : James Butler	February 17, 2023
The Warners take down a smooth talking polar bear developer who is taking advantage of global warming for his housing sales.; In an advertisement, a grass family's life is shown, until it is ultimately cut down by an mower.; While Brain has gone out, Pinky finds Brain's secret door that leads into a virtual alternate reality created by Brain where he and an AI version of Julia are a couple. When Brain returns, he is forced to enter to rescue Pinky.; A video demonstrates how dangerous certain cute things can be.
34	8	"WARnerGAMES" (Y)	Katie Rice	Timothy Nash and Lucas Crandles	February 17, 2023
34	8	"Bedtime" (St)	Katie Rice	Jess Lacher	February 17, 2023
34	8	"WARnerGAMES 2" (Y)	Katie Rice	Timothy Nash and Lucas Crandles	February 17, 2023
34	8	"Crumbly's Moment" (O)	Katie Rice	Story by : Katie Rice; Teleplay by : James Butler	February 17, 2023
The Warners find themselves trapped inside a video game after accidentally entering a cheat code and must defeat their golden copies to escape from their video game whist also being controlled by Ralph, who has been sent by Nora to get them out.; Cindy and Starbox have to get ready for bed.; Crumbly, an abused football mascot, dreams of attending dance school.
35	9	"How the Brain Thieved Christmas (Part One)" (P)	Matt Yang	Timothy Nash and Lucas Crandles	February 17, 2023
35	9	"Santamaniacs" (Y)	Matt Yang	Timothy Nash and Lucas Crandles	February 17, 2023
35	9	"How the Brain Thieved Christmas (Part Two)" (P)	Matt Yang	Timothy Nash and Lucas Crandles	February 17, 2023
Brain desperately tries to take over the world with a new Christmas toy: a robotic Pinky doll, in an attempt to destroy Christmas, but a gift from the real Pinky fills him with holiday cheer.; The Warners help Santa save Christmas when he won't give everybody their presents after getting too much complaints.
36	10	"International Mouse of Mystery" (P)	Matt Yang	James Butler, Kathleen Chen, Lucas Crandles, Brad DePrima and Brian Polk	February 17, 2023
36	10	"Aliens Resurrected" (Y)	Brett Varon	Lucas Crandles and Timothy Nash	February 17, 2023
36	10	"Joe" (O)	Katie Rice	Story by : Katie Rice; Teleplay by : James Butler	February 17, 2023
36	10	"The Stickening" (Y)	Brett Varon	Eric Branscum and Jess Lacher	February 17, 2023
36	10	"Slappy's Return" (S)	Adriel Garcia	James Butler, Lucas Crandles and Timothy Nash	February 17, 2023
36	10	"Everyday Safety: Giant Adirondack Chair" (Y)	Brett Varon	Kathleen Chen, Brian Polk and Wellesley Wild	February 17, 2023
Cold open: Pinky and Brain plan to reboot the James Bond franchise so they can make money, but their idea is immediately rejected, leaving Brain to have to find another franchise to reboot, with Pinky getting an idea by swiping away the rejection to reveal the Animaniacs theme.; In a sequel to season 2's "A Brief History of History", when the aliens return and invade Earth, Yakko has to sing a song to them about why the Earth is worth saving.; Joe interrupts his mother's game of cards.; The Warners visit an amusement park and find themselves in a sticky situation when Wakko's giant lollipop gets stuck on Dot's head.; Slappy Squirrel is bothered by her fans.; The Warners give the viewers a safety tip on how to survive on top of a giant Adirondack chair. Yakko interrupts a preview of another safety tip involving a meteor, noting that the series has not been renewed. While trying to think of their last lines (referencing the first season), Wakko suggests one, but is cut short when the meteor strikes, ending the final segment.
