= Animaniacs (2020 TV series) =

2020 American animated TV series

- Also known as: Steven Spielberg Presents Animaniacs
- Genre: Musical; Satire; Surreal comedy; Sketch comedy; Slapstick
- Based on: Animaniacs by Tom Ruegger
- Developed by: Wellesley Wild
- Voices of: Rob Paulsen; Jess Harnell; Tress MacNeille; Maurice LaMarche
- Theme music composer: Richard Stone; Tom Ruegger
- Opening theme: "Animaniacs Theme (2020)" performed by Rob Paulsen, Tress MacNeille, and Jess Harnell
- Ending theme: "Animaniacs End Title"
- Composers: Julie Bernstein; Steven Bernstein
- Country of origin: United States
- Original language: English
- No. of seasons: 3
- No. of episodes: 36 (125 segments) (list of episodes)

Production
- Executive producers: Steven Spielberg; Wellesley Wild; Justin Falvey; Darryl Frank; Sam Register; Gabe Swarr (season 3)
- Producers: Joann Sumagaysay Estoesta; Kathleen Chen (season 3); Lucas Crandles (season 3); Timothy Nash (season 3); Brian Polk (season 3)
- Running time: 23–27 minutes (3–9 minutes per segment)
- Production companies: Amblin Television; Warner Bros. Animation (Note: Animation services by Yowza! Animation, Tonic DNA, Titmouse, Inc., Snipple Animation Studios, Digital eMation, Tiger Animation and Saerom Animation.)

Original release
- Network: Hulu
- Release: November 20, 2020 – February 17, 2023

Related
- Animaniacs (1993–1998); Pinky and the Brain (1995–1998); Pinky, Elmyra & the Brain (1998–1999)

Animaniacs is an American animated comedy musical television series developed by Wellesley Wild and produced by Warner Bros. Animation for Hulu. A revival of the 1993 TV series Animaniacs created by Tom Ruegger, the new series sees the return of the Warner siblings, Yakko, Wakko, and Dot (voiced respectively by their original voice actors, Rob Paulsen, Jess Harnell, and Tress MacNeille), and Pinky and the Brain (voiced by their respective original voice actors Paulsen and Maurice LaMarche).

The series was first announced in January 2018 with a two-season order and Amblin Television and Warner Bros. Animation producing; the series debuted on Hulu on November 20, 2020. The second season debuted on November 5, 2021. The third and final season was released on February 17, 2023.

== Premise ==
Animaniacs continues to focus on the adventures of the Warner siblings, Yakko, Wakko, and Dot—three inseparable, hyperactive kids—as they embark on further adventures after being absent from television for 22 years, bringing with them the usual wackiness and mayhem they create while adapting to the changes and life of the 21st century. Episodes are composed of several shorts, with each episode consisting of segments following the adventures of Yakko, Wakko and Dot; the vast majority of episodes also include a segment featuring fan-favorite characters Pinky and the Brain—two lab mice, one of whom is intelligent and wants to take over the world, while the other is dim-witted and clumsy, often messing up his friend's plans.

Recurring segments new to the revival include Starbox and Cindy, which follows a miniature alien who is part of a fleet who wants to destroy the Earth but ends up in the hands of a young girl; The Incredible Gnome in People's Mouths, centered on the titular gnome who ventures into different people's mouths to speak for them, Math-terpiece Theater, which involves dramatized math lessons taught by Dot, and Everyday Safety, a parody of 1980s safety videos featuring the Warner siblings.

== Voice cast ==
- Rob Paulsen as Yakko Warner, Pinky and Dr. Scratchansniff
- Jess Harnell as Wakko Warner
- Tress MacNeille as Dot Warner
- Maurice LaMarche as The Brain
- Frank Welker as Ralph T. Guard
- Stephanie Escajeda as Nora Rita Norita

== Episodes ==
Season	Segments	Episodes	Originally released
1	42	13	November 20, 2020
2	44	13	November 5, 2021
3	37	10	February 17, 2023

== Development ==
=== Conception ===
Early stages of developing the revival of Animaniacs at Amblin Television and Warner Bros. Animation began in May 2017. The interest in the revival was driven by a surge of popularity for the original show when it was made available on Netflix in 2016, plus numerous successful projects that have revived interest in older shows, such as Fuller House. The revival was officially announced by the streaming service Hulu in January 2018 in partnership with Spielberg and Warner Bros. Domestic Television Distribution. The broadcast rights for the new series also included rights for Hulu to stream all episodes of Tiny Toon Adventures, Animaniacs, Pinky and the Brain, and Pinky, Elmyra & the Brain. Hulu considered the show its first original series targeted for families.

Spielberg returned to serve as executive producer, alongside Sam Register, president of Warner Bros. Animation and Warner Digital Series, and Amblin Television co-presidents Justin Falvey and Darryl Frank. The show was produced by Amblin Television and Warner Bros. Animation. Wellesley Wild, a writer for Family Guy, was named the showrunner, while Gabe Swarr was named as co-executive producer. In addition to Wild and Swarr, Carl Faruolo served as supervising director.

Wild and Swarr developed the revival to be respectful of the original series as closely as possible. Wild stated "There's lightning in a bottle here and the first thing I'm going to do is keep that lightning in the bottle, vigilantly." In addition, with the show's 20-plus year hiatus, Wild and Swarr believed that a good portion of their audience would be parents who had watched the show as children themselves and were introducing their own children to the new show; they wanted to create a similar Jurassic World effect due to the similar gap from the original Jurassic Park film, and thus partially inspired the series' introductory short being a parody of Jurassic Park. Wild wanted to make sure to keep the same type of bi-level humor that the original show had, with more slapstick and visual comedy that would appeal to younger audiences, while having a higher level of humor that parents and adults would catch on to, often where some of the more risque humor could be included without evoking any censoring.

According to Wild, Spielberg was at every pitch meeting and insisted on maintaining most of the elements of the original show, including the original voice cast and orchestrated music, as well as producing the show as typical of most adult animated shows with a full writers' room in contrast to typical children's animated shows. Spielberg was also heavily involved throughout the storyboarding process to make sure that the show was heading in the right direction, according to Wild. Both Wild and Swarr stated that Spielberg wanted the revival to feature more political satire, and they found a middle ground between that and being a children's show.

The revival primarily features the returns of Yakko, Wakko and Dot, Dr. Scratchansniff, Ralph the Guard and Pinky and the Brain, with many of the numerous other supporting characters from the original show not included in their own segments, instead having their roles largely reduced to non-speaking cameos; in the case of Hello Nurse, this has been one of the first characters that the staff knew they could not bring back due to the changing sensibilities between the 1990s and 2020, according to Wild. Similarly, Thaddeus Plotz was confirmed to have departed Warner Bros. with a new Latina-American CEO named Nora Rita Norita in charge. For the rest of the extensive supporting cast from the original series (including characters such as Slappy Squirrel and Buttons and Mindy), though there were plans for them to return in their corresponding segments in early stages of development, they were discarded because, as in a similar manner to Hello Nurse and Thaddeus Plotz, they wanted to update the reboot with a new set of characters that were far more relevant; for example, in the case of the Goodfeathers, Wild felt that a parody of Goodfellas would be "so dated", thus giving them the opportunity to make spoofs of modern films, also due to the fact that in his opinion, some jokes will not be suitable for these segments; aside from making cameos throughout the revival, there has not been a word yet if these characters will return in the future. Similarly, Dot was presented to be more reliant on her wits than being cute, an aspect Wild also believed would resonate better with current attitudes. Similar to the DuckTales reboot, they also considered careful nods to other cartoon characters from related series or past Looney Tunes, but without losing the show's focus on the Warners or Pinky and the Brain. They had attempted to have a segment to feature Freakazoid from the show of the same name, but this fell through due to actor availability.

=== Casting and music ===
The revival features Yakko, Wakko, and Dot, as well as Pinky and the Brain; Paulsen (as Yakko, Pinky and Dr. Scratchansniff), Harnell (as Wakko), MacNeille (as Dot), and LaMarche (as the Brain) were confirmed to be reprising their voice roles in October 2019. Abby Trott was picked as a new voice artist on the team. Steven Bernstein, composing partner of the late Richard Stone, and his wife Julie Bernstein, composed underscore and songs during the show's original run. The Bernsteins scored the revival with a 35-piece orchestra, recording remotely after the COVID-19 lockdown. A stable of songwriters, including Roddy Hart and Tommy Reilly, and Randy Rogel who wrote featured songs in the original series, compose songs in the revival. However, other key production personnel from the original series, like Tom Ruegger, were not asked upfront to help craft the series. Ruegger said he was later offered the opportunity to submit a script but declined, as "basically it would be like an audition and I just didn't feel comfortable auditioning for a show that I created". Original series writer and voice actress Sherri Stoner returned in 2023 as the voice of Slappy Squirrel for the revival's final episode.

WaterTower Music released the first season soundtrack album of the revival digitally on August 13, 2021. An album for season two was released on August 19, 2022. An album for season three was released on September 8, 2023.

=== Production ===
Initial storyboarding work started around July 2018. Paulsen confirmed that voice recording had begun around May 2020. The music was recorded during the COVID-19 pandemic, with the Bernsteins coordinating with each musician individually from separate locations to assemble the final pieces.

The original designs (left) and the new look of the Warners in the revival (right)

Swarr said of the look for the series, they initially explored various different styles drawn by a variety of artists, but recognized that the original series had its own series of differences in how the Warners were drawn due to the different animation studios. In reviewing those, they found that the episodes produced by TMS Entertainment were generally considered the best and Swarr described their work as "The construction is so good; they have so much control." After doing a deep dive to identify the factors that made the TMS portrayals of the Warners work, the team behind the revival were introduced to Genevieve Tsai, an artist working as a background painter on Warner Bros. and Netflix's Green Eggs and Ham series, who also had been a fan of the original show. Tsai helped to take the details from the TMS deep dive as well as other research into past works that had inspired the original show such as older Looney Tunes shorts, and developed the new look for the Warners, generally more angular and following the same approach TMS had used. They crafted a set of rules alongside the models for the revised characters that they then used when they sent the show off to be animated by seven different studios: Yowza! Animation in Toronto; Tonic DNA in Montreal; Titmouse, Inc. in Los Angeles (specifically Titmouse Canada from Vancouver); Snipple Animation Studios in Manila, Philippines; and three studios in Seoul, South Korea: Digital eMation, Tiger Animation, and Saerom Animation. WB Animation in Burbank otherwise handled the pre- and post-production of all episodes. In additional to the character model updates, they wanted the background art to feel like paintings but avoiding some of the stylings of the 90s, like exaggerated curved features.

Paulsen said in an interview that, within the revival, the Warners are aware that they have been off the air for over 20 years. The episodes were prepared in 2019 and the writers had anticipated for events in 2020, but some ended up being affected by the COVID-19 pandemic, such as the planned 2020 Summer Olympics.

== Broadcast ==
The first 13 episodes of the revival premiered on November 20, 2020. The second season of 13 episodes debuted on November 5, 2021. On October 11, a first-look clip was released during the Animaniacs panel at the 2020 New York Comic Con, parodying Spielberg's own Jurassic Park with a caricature of Spielberg in the role of John Hammond having "reanimated" the Warners. The clip was introduced as the cold open from the first episode of the revived show. On October 12, 2020, the names for the first episode segments were leaked. The trailer was released on October 21, 2020.

On October 10, 2021, a second season teaser was shown at the 2021 New York Comic Con, satirizing Saturday morning cartoons of the 1980s, specifically ThunderCats, Transformers, and G.I. Joe. Season 2 was initially released under a TV-14 rating; it was later fixed to TV-PG.

Hulu ordered a 10-episode third season in February 2021, bringing the series total up to 36 episodes. In December 2022, the third season was announced to be the show's last, with a premiere date of February 17, 2023.

A series of four Pinky and the Brain shorts, in collaboration with education platform MasterClass, was released on March 17, 2023.

=== International broadcast ===
The show also aired in Canada on Teletoon. It began with a four-episode marathon on the evening of November 20, 2020, before easing into a permanent time slot of Saturday mornings the following day. The show is available on Canadian streaming service Teletoon Plus. In March 2023, reruns and new episode debuts moved to the reorganized Cartoon Network Canada, which replaced Teletoon's feed.

The show became available to stream on HBO Max and airs on Cartoon Network in Latin America. On August 14, 2021, some scenes got censored during the Cartoon Network airing.

In Australia, the show became available on Stan on September 1, 2021.

In Ireland, the show aired on TRTÉ on RTÉ2 on March 9, 2023.

In New Zealand, the show aired on TVNZ 2 on May 3, 2026, but was never available to stream on TVNZ+ due to licensing.

== Home media ==
The first season was officially released on DVD on June 1, 2021, by Warner Bros. Home Entertainment through Studio Distribution Services. In April 2021, the first season of Animaniacs was released on iTunes, Vudu, Google Play, Amazon Prime Video, and the Microsoft Store. The DVD release of the reboot's second season released for June 21, 2022, with a digital release following on July 10, 2022. The digital release for season 3 occurred on June 18, 2023, along with a Complete Series bundle.

== Reception ==
=== Critical reaction ===
The first season of the show received positive reviews from critics who praised the voice acting, musical score and animation. On Rotten Tomatoes, the first season has an approval rating of 81% based on 37 reviews, with an average rating of 7.2/10. The website's critics consensus reads, "Charming and chaotic, if slightly too caustic, Animaniacs is a delightful revitalization of a beloved series that's fun enough to make up for any early fumbles."

Some critics felt that the revival of the series lacked the same charm that the original show had, which was attributed to the lack of any of the original production staff on the new show, as well as the influence of more recent animated shows like Family Guy on the show's approach. Alan Sepinwall of Rolling Stone said that while the revival maintains the humor for the Pinky and the Brain shorts, the shorts with the Warners were not as well done as the original series. Sepinwall said, "Where their powers of exasperation once made them unstoppable, now they're the ones who seem impotent and irritated by the people and culture around them.", a factor he attributes to the lack of the original producers' involvement with the revival. Variety's Caroline Framke said that the series focused too much on trying to lampoon current and political events, a measure exacerbated by the fact that the forward-looking writing approach was affected by the COVID-19 pandemic, instead of simply parodying the entertainment industry in general, and left the show "more of a sour aftertaste that keeps it from being as effervescent as it once was, and could be." The A.V. Club's Danette Chavez gave the first season a C+, stating that "when Animaniacs remembers to have fun, it makes for lively, occasionally impressive, viewing" but felt that the balance between satire and silliness was off, with many of the parodies that targeted modern issues lacking subtlety. Beth Elderkin of Gizmodo said that the revival did not have the same "biting" satire as the original, with some jokes having to be explained to some degree to the audience, and that the show felt that it held on to trying to be a product of the 90s, and thus did not have a clear target of what audience it was trying to please.

Paste's Joseph Staniclar spoke more highly of the show's take on political and contemporary topics, saying that while it may rely too heavily on modern references, "it's refreshing to see the show's satire actually take political stances instead of falling into the crowd-pleasing 'both sides'-isms many modern comedies now take." Ethan Anderton of Slashfilm also stated that the new show heavily references political commentary, but, as with the original series, praised that the show equally targeted aspects across partisan lines, and that "no one is safe from the buffoonery and mockery of Animaniacs." Jesse Schedeen, writing for IGN, gave the first season an 8 out of 10, writing, "Animaniacs is a mostly witty and faithful update to an old favorite. Despite the march of time and a flashier coat of paint, the new series plays remarkably similar to its predecessor. Yakko, Wakko, and Dot's misadventures are still a hoot, and the Pinky and the Brain segments help add just enough variety to keep each episode humming along. Some fans may lament the loss of so many classic supporting characters, but the emphasis on the big guns has its clear benefits. Animaniacs is a concentrated blast of cartoon nostalgia that any Fox Kids or Kids' WB veteran would do well to check out."

The Verge's Joshua Rivera stated that the show's approach to satire of the entertainment industry, political topics, and modern culture done in the same style as the original show did not hold up well, considering newer animated shows like Family Guy, BoJack Horseman and Rick and Morty that had more innovative ways to present such satire. Kate Cox of Ars Technica said that with some of the repetition of humor between episodes and the lack of cast variety, the show does not lend well to binge viewing typical of streaming services, but otherwise still has the original show's trademark comedy and that "it has the seeds of a great show in it".

Tom Ruegger, the creator of the original series who was not brought back for the reboot, was also disappointed with the final product, stating in an interview with Rolling Stone that he found it "morally, ethically and professionally wrong", while at the same time, criticizing certain aspects of the reboot, most notably Warner Bros. not bringing back the original team and the absence of the other characters, stating about the former that the revival should not have used the title of Animaniacs, as he explains that it was an umbrella title for all of the characters, not only the Warners and Pinky and the Brain. Maurice LaMarche, the voice actor for the Brain, stated that he disliked certain changes made in the reboot, such as its portrayal of the Warners as victims of a chaotic world and the Brain being more villainous and mean than in the original series.

Reception of the second season of the show was far more positive, currently having on Rotten Tomatoes a rare 100% "Fresh" rating out of six reviews with an average rating of 7.5/10; the second season was considered an improvement over the first season by various critics and fans, while more mixed reviews felt that most of segments should've been released as part of the previous season, something that was attributed to the fact that both seasons were produced simultaneously.

=== Johnny Depp controversy ===
The show's first episode has attracted controversy for a background joke in the first episode. During the "Reboot It" song sequence, two posters are shown referencing the nursery rhyme and Internet meme "Johny Johny Yes Papa", Johnny 2: Telling Lies and Johnny: The Beginning, the former of which features Johnny Depp in the title role. The series had aired a few weeks after Depp lost in his lawsuit against The Sun related to publications of allegations of abusive treatment of his ex-wife Amber Heard, which led to Warner Bros. asking Depp to resign from the Fantastic Beasts franchise and replacing him with Mads Mikkelsen. People voiced their outrage on social media about the unfortunate juxtaposition of Depp's image and the "Telling Lies" subtitle, calling it an unfair jab at the allegations, leading to petitions and social media campaigns to boycott Animaniacs. According to Paulsen, the series had been animated before the legal battle among Depp, Heard, and The Sun had begun, and that the reference was only poking fun at the nursery rhyme.

=== Awards and nominations ===
Year	Association	Award category	Nominee	Result
2021	Producers Guild of America Awards	Outstanding Children's Program	Animaniacs	Nominated
2021	Daytime Emmy Awards	Outstanding Performer in an Animated Program	Tress MacNeille as Dot Warner	Nominated
2021	Daytime Emmy Awards	Outstanding Voice Directing for a Daytime Animated Series	Sara Jane Sherman	Won
2021	Daytime Emmy Awards	Outstanding Music Direction and Composition for a Preschool, Children's, or Animated Program	Steven Bernstein and Julie Bernstein	Nominated
2021	Daytime Emmy Awards	Outstanding Original Song for a Preschool, Children's, or Animated Program	Jess Lacher, Andrew Barbot, Roddy Hart and Tommy Reilly "Suffragette City"	Won
2021	Daytime Emmy Awards	Outstanding Editing for a Daytime Animated Program	Ryan Burkhard, Mark Jeffery Miller and Philip Malamuth (shared with Hilda)	Won
2021	Daytime Emmy Awards	Outstanding Individual in Animation	Karl Hadrika	Won
2021	Hollywood Critics Association TV Awards	Best Animated Series or Animated Television Movie	Animaniacs	Nominated
2022	Producers Guild of America Awards	Outstanding Children's Program	Animaniacs	Nominated
2023	Astra Creative Arts TV Awards	Best Streaming Animated Series or TV Movie	Animaniacs	Nominated
2023	Children's and Family Emmy Awards	Outstanding Voice Performance in a Children's or Young Teen Program	Rob Paulsen as Pinky, Dr. Scratchansniff and Yakko Warner	Nominated
2023	Children's and Family Emmy Awards	Outstanding Music Direction and Composition for an Animated Program	Steven Bernstein and Julie Bernstein	Nominated
2024	Annie Awards	Outstanding Achievement for Music in an Animated Television / Broadcast Production	Steven Bernstein and Julie Bernstein "Talladega Mice"	Nominated
