= Rock Sugar =

American rock band

- Origin: Los Angeles, California, U.S.
- Genres: Heavy metal, hard rock
- Years active: 2010–present
- Members: Jess Harnell; Chuck Duran; Michael Christopher; Kevin Kapler
- Past members: Johnny Santoro; Alexander Track
- Website: rocksugarband.com

Rock Sugar is an American rock band known for their mashups of pop music and heavy metal from the 1980s.

== History ==
The band's fictitious backstory claims the sound was achieved when the metal band was stranded on a desert island in 1989 with a CD player, plenty of batteries, and the CD collection of a 13-year-old girl. The band signed with Paradigm in April 2010. In April 2012, the band signed with ARM Entertainment (Artist Representation and Management).

Lead singer Jess Harnell is better known for his voice work in film and television than his musical career. Harnell voiced Wakko Warner in the Animaniacs cartoon series, voiced Secret Squirrel in the 2 Stupid Dogs shorts and is the current official voice actor for Disney's Brer Rabbit. He has also served as the announcer for America's Funniest Home Videos for more than 10 years and has voiced the titular protagonist of the Crash Bandicoot series since 2005. In 1995, he released a solo album entitled The Sound of Your Voice.

Drummer/keyboardist/vocalist Alexander Track received a Master of Music Degree from the Academy of Music and Performing Arts, Vienna, Austria and won a Grammy Award for engineering in 2006. He is the president and CEO of Track Entertainment Studios in Los Angeles, California. He co-produced, recorded, engineered and co-mixed Rock Sugar's debut CD: Reimaginator.

Lead guitarist/vocalist Chuck Duran is the owner of Los Angeles' top Voice-Over Demo Production house 'Demos That Rock'. They've won multiple SOVAS awards for their demo production work. He also dubs Steve Valentine's singing voice on the Disney XD series I'm in the Band. He is the co-host of the voice-over web series VO Buzz Weekly alongside Stacey J. Aswad.

Chuck and Jess' were also featured multiple times on the soundtrack for the hit movie 'My Cousin Vinnie'.

Michael Christopher's original music can be heard on TV Show's like 'Say Yes to the Dress', 'Randy to the Rescue', 'Big Timber', 'Tiny House Nation' and more. He is also a Voice-Actor who voices characters in animation and video games. Some titles include: 'Droners' (as Oro), 'Pokemon : Masters EX' (as Wallace), and 'Final Fantasy : Brave Exvious' (as Lorenzo) among others.

Kevin Kapler plays drums in multiple projects in Los Angeles and is a former member of the band Crazy Town. He is also the son of The Late Show house band's Saxophone player of 20 plus years Bruce Kapler.

Original member, bassist Johnny Santoro aka Johnny Five joined Rock Sugar in 2010. He left the band on August 29, 2011. On December 12, 2011, the band introduced their new bassist, Ken Cain.

On November 24, 2020, the band announced a new album, ReInventinator, to be crowdfunded on Kickstarter. The album was successfully funded and was released on April 19, 2021.

== Band members ==
Current

- Jess Harnell – lead vocals (2010–present)
- Chuck Duran – lead guitar, vocals (2010–present)
- Michael Christopher – bassist, vocals (2014–present)
- Kevin Kapler – drums (2014–present)

Former

- Johnny Santoro – bassist (2010–2011)
- Alex Track - Drummer, keyboards, vocals

== Locations ==
The band's tour schedule includes rock festivals, once sharing the stage with members of Guns N' Roses. In April 2010, the band appeared on the Food Network show Private Chefs of Beverly Hills in an episode where the chefs prepare food for the band's CD release party. In April/May 2010, the band performed at the Melodic Rock Fest 2 in Elgin, Illinois sharing the stage with melodic rock bands Danger Danger, Y&T and Winger among others. The band has performed for foundations including the Toby Keith Foundation in Oklahoma and Larry the Cable Guy's Git-R-Done Foundation (Florida). In May 2010, the band performed two shows at the Beale Street Music Festival in Memphis, Tennessee. Along with securing residencies at the House of Blues, Sunset Blvd. Los Angeles and in Las Vegas, Rock Sugar shared the stage with the Scorpions and RATT in Memphis, Queensrÿche in Colorado, Poison in Idaho, Tesla in Albuquerque, Kid Rock, Saliva, Skillet and Hinder in Wisconsin, Cinderella in Montana among many others. Rock Sugar has been featured on the Fox Television Network on Fox & Friends performing in New York, Avenue of the Americas.

On June 12, 2010, Rock Sugar played at the Download Festival at Donington Park, England. They appeared at the festival again in 2011. Performances in 2012 included the Mid-South Rally for the Wounded Warrior Project, Mississippi and shows in Las Vegas, Lake Tahoe, Arkansas, Montana and at the Playboy Mansion in Los Angeles.

== Albums ==
=== Reimaginator ===
Reimaginator was released in 2010. Each song is a mash-up of two or more songs. Each song has at least one rock or heavy metal song and one pop or pop rock song.

No.	Title	Length
1.	"Don't Stop the Sandman" (Don't Stop Believin' by Journey + Enter Sandman by Metallica)	4:59
2.	"We Will Kickstart Your Rhapsody" (We Will Rock You and Bohemian Rhapsody by Queen + Kickstart My Heart by Mötley Crüe)	5:45
3.	"Crazy Girl" (Crazy Train by Ozzy Osbourne + Jessie's Girl by Rick Springfield)	3:47
4.	"Voices in the Jungle" (Voices Carry by 'Til Tuesday + Welcome to the Jungle by Guns N' Roses)	4:33
5.	"Here Comes the Fool You Wanted" (Wanted Dead or Alive by Bon Jovi + Here Comes the Rain Again and Sweet Dreams (Are Made of This) by Eurythmics + Nobody's Fool by Cinderella)	5:37
6.	"Shook Me Like a Prayer" (You Shook Me All Night Long by AC/DC + Like a Prayer by Madonna)	4:49
7.	"Straight to Rock City" (Detroit Rock City by Kiss + Straight Up by Paula Abdul)	4:13
8.	"Prayin' for a Sweet Weekend" (Livin' on a Prayer by Bon Jovi + Working for the Weekend by Loverboy + Sweet Child o' Mine by Guns N' Roses)	4:57
9.	"Heaven and Heaven" (Heaven by Warrant + Heaven by Bryan Adams)	4:40
10.	"Breakin' the Love" (Breakin' the Law by Judas Priest + I'm Not in Love by 10cc)	3:28
11.	"I Love Sugar on Me" (I Love Rock 'n' Roll by Joan Jett and the Blackhearts + Pour Some Sugar on Me by Def Leppard)	3:33
12.	"Round and Separated" (Round and Round by Ratt + Separate Ways (Worlds Apart) by Journey)	5:39
13.	"Dreaming of a Whole Lotta Breakfast" (Dream On by Aerosmith + Whole Lotta Love by Led Zeppelin + Stairway to Heaven by Led Zeppelin + Breakfast in America by Supertramp)	4:05

=== ReInventinator ===
ReInventinator was released in 2021 after being successfully crowdfunded. The songs "Since Ur Barracuda's Been An Immigrant", "Any Highway You Want", and "Roll You In The Hurricane" were played live before the album released, while the songs "Roll You In The Hurricane" and "Shout At The Devil Dog All Night" had videos uploaded to the Rock Sugar YouTube channel before the album was released. The album featured Jess Harnell (lead and backing vocals), Chuck Duran(all guitars and backing vocals), Michael Christopher (all bass and backing vocals), and Kevin Kapler (drums and gang vocals). The album was produced by Yossi Shakked

- Selected drum tracks were recorded by veteran drummer Greg Bissonette as well.

No.	Title	Length
1.	"Walk In Black For Centuries" (Walk This Way by Aerosmith + Back in Black by AC/DC + Centuries by Fall Out Boy + Paradise City by Guns N' Roses + Africa by Toto)	5:05
2.	"Crawling Numb To Somebody Bohemian" (Bohemian Rhapsody and Somebody to Love and We Are the Champions and We Will Rock You and Who Wants to Live Forever and The Show Must Go On by Queen + Numb and Crawling and In the End and One More Light by Linkin Park)	4:51
3.	"Faithful Child O' Mine" (Faithfully by Journey + Sweet Child o' Mine by Guns N' Roses)	5:50
4.	"Shout At The Devil Dog All Night" (Shout by Tears for Fears + Shout at the Devil by Mötley Crüe + Black Dog by Led Zeppelin + Up All Night by Slaughter)	5:49
5.	"Rebels Out Of Heaven" (Rebel Yell by Billy Idol + Locked Out of Heaven by Bruno Mars)	4:57
6.	"Wires Of Summer" (Live Wire by Mötley Crüe + The Boys of Summer by Don Henley)	3:09
7.	"Someone Like Home" (Someone like You by Adele + Home Sweet Home by Mötley Crüe + Sister Christian by Night Ranger)	5:03
8.	"Smells Like Teen Romance Of The Night" (Smells Like Teen Spirit by Nirvana + Still of the Night by Whitesnake + Bad Romance by Lady Gaga)	5:24
9.	"You Give Your Love A Bad Name" (You Give Love a Bad Name and Runaway by Bon Jovi + Your Love by The Outfield)	3:31
10.	"Since Ur Barracuda's Been An Immigrant" (Since U Been Gone by Kelly Clarkson + Barracuda by Heart + Immigrant Song by Led Zeppelin + It's My Life by Bon Jovi)	4:17
11.	"Another Edge Of The Tiger In The Air" (Another Brick in the Wall by Pink Floyd + Edge of Seventeen by Stevie Nicks + Eye of the Tiger by Survivor + In the Air Tonight by Phil Collins)	5:44
12.	"Roll You in the Hurricane" (Rolling in the Deep by Adele + Rock You Like a Hurricane by Scorpions + Time After Time by Cyndi Lauper)	4:48
13.	"Any Highway You Want" (Any Way You Want It by Journey + Highway to Hell by AC/DC)	3:52
14.	"Countdown To Fireworks" (The Final Countdown by Europe + Firework by Katy Perry)	5:56
