= Robots (2005 video game) =

- North American PS2 cover art
- Developers: Eurocom (console and PC); Griptonite Games (GBA/DS)
- Publisher: Vivendi Universal Games (Note: Released under the Sierra Entertainment brand name in all regions except Japan)
- Producer: Michael Schneider
- Programmers: Mark Duffill; Diego Garcia Huerta; Ben Idoine; Jim Makin; Kevin Marks; Andy Mitchell; Bob Smith; Kevin Thacker; Laura Zucchetti
- Artists: Paul Gregory; Michael Hirst; Hervé Piton; David Navarro; Thomas O'Neill
- Composers: Steve Duckworth (consoles); Ian Stocker (handhelds)
- Platforms: Game Boy Advance; GameCube; Nintendo DS; PlayStation 2 Xbox; Windows
- Release: NA: February 22, 2005; EU: March 11, 2005
- Genre: Platform
- Mode: Single-player

Robots is a platform video game released in 2005. The game was developed by Eurocom and published by Vivendi Universal Games to coincide with the CGI-animated film of the same name.

== Summary ==
=== PC/PS2/Xbox/GameCube version ===
A robot named Rodney Copperbottom decides to leave his home at Rivet Town and head to Robot City to realize his dream of working for his childhood hero, Bigweld. He makes a flying robot called Wonderbot out of scrap before he leaves. At the city, he goes to Bigweld's factory, but realizes that Bigweld is mysteriously absent, and finds out that the factory is currently being run by a robot by the name of Phineas T. Ratchet, who hatches an evil plan to create more futuristic robots like himself and destroy old robots made out of scrap. Rodney also meets a gang of colorful outmodes called the Rusties, who are also affected by the change Ratchet has made. A robot named Jack Hammer tells Rodney that there are many scrap parts in the sewers of Robot City and that Rodney can go collect the scrap in order to keep the Rusties alive. After doing so, Rodney and the Rusties go to Bigweld's Mansion to find Bigweld. Bigweld agrees to help Rodney and the Rusties, and sets off with Rodney to stop Ratchet and save all robot-kind.

=== DS/GBA version ===
The DS/GBA plot is basically the same, though the open-ended nature of the world means there are a few more diversions. The player begins in a Train Station having left Rivet City as Rodney Copperbottom, and after a brief jaunt through the city you approach Bigweld's Factory, but are told they no longer seek inventors. You sneak into the place and accidentally interrupt a meeting held by Phineas T. Ratchet, who immediately kicks you out.

After being tossed into the underground, Rodney explores and comes across a group of outmodes collectively named the Rusties. They mention that Bigweld has been gone for a long time, and that Ratchet seems to be wanting to destroy them for unknown reasons. Rodney assists a robot named Jack Hammer with a favor, and he informs the player that there's a party going on in the northern part of the map. Rodney ventures there, has a scuffle with Ratchet, and travels to Bigweld's Mansion. You find the old robot, who initially thinks your cause is lost, but decides to assist Rodney anyhow.

He returns to his factory with you in tow, and you come across him being attacked by Ratchet. Rodney escapes by riding Bigweld in another boss fight until he falls into Madame Gasket's lair. You follow quickly and eventually fight the old robot herself, finally putting an end to the tyranny that has been plaguing the city.

== Gameplay ==
This game features Rodney Copperbottom as the playable main character. The player can also play as the Wonderbot in certain areas, and Bigweld in the chase scene.

Rodney can invent different devices by collecting a certain amount of blueprints scattered throughout the environment. In the beginning of the game, he repairs his Wonderbot, his personal companion. He also obtains the Scrap Launcher from Herb Copperbottom, a weapon which uses Scrap as ammo which is found in the worlds of the game, and a wrench which is used as a melee weapon. More weapons are acquired throughout the course of the game. Scrap is also used to purchase items at vendors, including the Maxi-Scrap 500 and Maxi-Scrap 1000 which upgrades his Scrap capacity from 200 to 500 and 1000 respectively, the Refine-O-Max which doubles the value of Scrap, and four mutually exclusive upgrades to his Scrap Launcher which can be replaced at any time. Later while in Robot City he obtains the Magnabeam from Jack Hammer, which uses energy which must be refilled by going on recharge circles, and can also be used as a weapon.

The GBA game functions as more of a Metroidvania-style game, where Rodney has to platform and fight enemies across a sizable world map, collecting upgrades by beating bosses and finding parts scattered across the city for different robots also scattered across the city. The weapons you gain open new areas of the map.

There are a handful of small minigames as well, from a game where you toss oil cans at customers to surviving a torrent of dominos. The fast travel system, taken from the film's transit system, also has a small mini-game where you can collect extra ammunition for weapons.

The scrap launcher remains from the console ports, though you obtain it through delivering an item in the first area rather than getting it from one of the movie characters. The Magnet Bomb attracts enemies closer to it and hits certain switches, and an Electric weapon that does the most damage and hits certain switches. Upgrades can be found for each that allow them to do more damage and have a longer range.

== Reception ==
Reception

Aggregate scores
Aggregator	Score
GameRankings	DS: 50.57% GBA: 46.75% GC: 46% PS2: 48.86% XBOX: 49.71%
Metacritic	GC: 56/100; PS2: 53/100; XBOX: 60/100

Review scores
Publication	Score
IGN	Consoles: 5/10; Handheld: 4.5/10
PlayStation Official Magazine – Australia	6/10
VideoGamer.com	3/10
Cube	NGC: 6/10

Robots received "mixed or average" reviews from critics according to the review aggregation website Metacritic. IGN gave the console versions a 5 out of 10 and wrote, "Sadly, not a Kraftwerk music title, but yet another franchise platformer." While they gave the handheld versions a 4.5 out of 10 and wrote "No matter if you get the GBA or DS version, it's the same boring adventure."
