= Rumble Racing =

2001 video game

- European cover art
- Developer: EA Redwood Shores
- Publisher: EA Games
- Composer: Don Veca
- Platform: PlayStation 2
- Release: NA: April 24, 2001; PAL: June 1, 2001
- Genre: Racing
- Modes: Single player, multiplayer, co-op

Rumble Racing is a 2001 racing video game developed and published by Electronic Arts for the PlayStation 2 console. It was heavily influenced by NASCAR Rumble.

== Gameplay ==
Rumble Racing is a combat-style game that can be played in co-op, single, and multiplayer mode. In this game, the player will race against other cars and attempt to win the five championship cups. There are 15 race tracks to unlock in total. Each track is different in its own way and features short cuts, power-ups and stunt opportunities. A new feature in this game is the "Trick". Tricks carry an important role with finishing races in a faster time. Doing multiple tricks rewards the player with additional speed boost depending on the difficulty of the trick. As the game progresses, tricks become necessary to complete more difficult missions. "This extreme racer combines break-neck speeds, multi-car pile-ups, and diverse track environments to appeal to racing game fans of all ages and skill levels." The game also presents 35 vehicles all with custom paint jobs. Due to the NASCAR license being removed, the game has access to more customization features.

In order to develop Rumble Racing, a lot of physics and calculations were involved. Scientists had to determine the physics of a burnout and side control, just like the standard go and stop.

== Reception ==
Reception

Aggregate score
| Aggregator | Score |
|---|---|
| Metacritic | 85/100 |

Review scores
| Publication | Score |
|---|---|
| AllGame | 4/5 |
| Edge | 4/10 |
| Electronic Gaming Monthly | 8.17/10 (Note: In Electronic Gaming Monthly's review of the game, one critic gave it a score of 7.5/10, and the rest gave it each a score of 8.5/10.) |
| EP Daily | 8.5/10 |
| Game Informer | 7.75/10 |
| GameSpot | 8.5/10 |
| IGN | 8.8/10 |
| Next Generation | 3/5 |
| Official U.S. PlayStation Magazine | 4.5/5 |
| PlayStation: The Official Magazine | 7/10 |
| The Cincinnati Enquirer | 4/5 |
| Playboy | 85% |

The game received "favorable" reviews according to the review aggregation website Metacritic. Kevin Rice of NextGen called it "a pretty, fun arcade racer with hours of replayability. But the memorization required of players and level of difficulty can be a turn-off." GamePro said of the game, "Sim freaks need not apply---Rumble Racing is pure, unapologetic arcade goodness." (Note: GamePro gave the game two 4.5/5 scores for graphics and sound, and two 5/5 scores for control and fun factor.)

Marc Saltzman of The Cincinnati Enquirer gave it a score of four stars out of five, calling it "one fast game — redrawing the graphics on the screen at roughly 60 frames-per-second (twice that of television) — so those with a need for speed should strap in for a ride." Later, when writing for Playboy, he gave it an 85%, saying, "Indeed, the cheesy southern rock 'n' redneck country tunes can get annoying after a while, and the smart-ass remarks made by the play-by-play commentator tend to repeat more often than not, but it hardly detracts from the overall, seat-of-your-pants racing." Maxim gave it four stars out of five, saying, "There aren't many games more extreme than this crazed, balls-to-the wall stock-car racer."

The game was nominated for the "Best Driving Game" award at GameSpot's Best and Worst of 2001 Awards, which went to Gran Turismo 3: A-Spec.
