= List of Pinky and the Brain episodes =

Pinky and the Brain is a Warner Bros. Animation (WBA) and Amblin Entertainment animated television series which ran from 1995 to 1998. The series was a spin-off from another WBA animated series, Animaniacs, and includes some of the "Pinky and the Brain" skits that were created as part of that show.

Pinky and the Brain was later retooled as the short-lived Pinky, Elmyra & the Brain, which ran in the 1998–1999 season for 13 episodes. The characters eventually returned to their roots as an Animaniacs skit in the 2020 revival of that series.

Outside of both the original Animaniacs and its revival, there were 65 Pinky and the Brain episodes produced.

The lists below are ordered by season, and then by episode number. Several episodes included two or more skits; these are identified by the segment number. The episode list reflects the show as aired in repeats and syndication and presented on the series DVDs; some initial Season 1 episodes had two or more programming variations on their first run.

== Series overview ==
Season	Episodes	Segments	Originally released	
Season	Episodes	Segments	First released	Last released
1	13	19	September 9, 1995	May 12, 1996
2	12	16	September 7, 1996	May 17, 1997
3	33	51	September 6, 1997	May 16, 1998
4	7	9	September 14, 1998	November 14, 1998

== Episodes ==
=== Season 1 (1995–96) ===
No. overall	No. in season	Title	Directed by	Written by	Original release date	Viewers (millions)
1	1	"Das Mouse"	Liz Holzman and Al Zegler	Peter Hastings	September 9, 1995	N/A
Brain must recover crab meat from the crabs that only live in the sunken wreckage of the RMS Titanic to implement a hypnotic food additive that is necessary for his latest plan for world domination.
2	2	"Of Mouse and Man"	Audu Paden	Peter Hastings	September 10, 1995	2.3
Brain, in his mechanical human suit, gets a job and then stages an accident, suing the company so as to obtain enough money to set up an automated answering system that will keep people busy while he takes over the world.
3a	3a	"Tokyo Grows"	Al Zegler	Gordon Bressack and Charles M. Howell IV	September 17, 1995	2.7
Brain plans to use a "growing ray" (originally a "shrinking ray") to grow Pinky into super-size while dressed up as Gollyzilla, a gargantuan reptilian kaiju, while Brain would turn himself gargantuan and stop him, using the name Brainodo, in exchange for world domination. However, the real Gollyzilla emerges from the ocean and starts destroying the city, making Brain mistakenly think that the monster is Pinky. The episode ends with the ray going out of control and making everything on Earth grow, including the Earth itself, to the point that Pinky, Brain, and even Gollyzilla are mouse-sized by comparison again.
3b	3b	"That Smarts"	Audu Paden	Peter Hastings	September 17, 1995	2.7
Brain creates a machine that can increase or decrease intelligence and uses it on Pinky so that he can become smart enough to understand that he is the cause of Brain's failures, due to research that Brain conducted. However, Pinky constantly finds flaws in every plan to take over the world that Brain proposes, causing Brain to tell Pinky to leave. Pinky, depressed and thinking that Brain does not like him anymore now that he is smart, gets the idea to use the machine to make himself stupid so that Brain will like him again. However, Brain discovers (based on Pinky's re-calculations of his research) that he himself is the cause of all his failures and that Pinky is now even smarter than he is. Believing both of them to be better off with Pinky as the genius and Brain as the idiot, Brain gets to the machine first and uses it on himself - only to find out that Pinky has now done the same thing after he did. In the end, both of them are idiots and are now too stupid to operate the machine and restore Brain to his intelligent self.
3c	3c	"Brainstem"	Greg Reyna	Tom Minton	September 17, 1995	2.7
Pinky and Brain sing about the parts of the human brain, to the tune of "Camptown Races".
4a	4a	"Pinky & the Fog"	Audu Paden	Gordon Bressack and Charles M. Howell IV	September 24, 1995	2.4
Brain becomes a serial radio voice actor similar to The Shadow as a means to use a special voice modulation device to control the minds of the listeners.
4b	4b	"Where No Mouse Has Gone Before"	Al Zegler	Gordon Bressack and Charles M. Howell IV	October 1, 1995	2.4
Brain changes a message on a deep space probe about to be launched to say that he is the ruler of the world instead of the humans; the probe is found by aliens who come to Earth to show their respect for Brain.
4c	4c	"Cheese Roll Call"	Rusty Mills	Paul Rugg	October 1, 1995	2.4
To the tune of John Philip Sousa's Semper Fidelis, Pinky sings of the different kinds of cheese he loves.
5	5	"Brainania"	Jon McClenahan	John P. McCann	November 12, 1995	4.0
Brain creates a fictional island nation in attempt to exploit the United States for billions of dollars in foreign aid.
6	6	"TV or Not TV"	Al Zegler	Peter Hastings	November 19, 1995	4.0
Brain invents dentures that gives him a smile which can hypnotize anyone that sees them. He goes on to attempt to become a celebrity (a stand-up comic specifically) to achieve mass population control. When starting out on his first show, he uses the jokes used by other comics, which gets him instant boos. But when he starts insulting the audience, everyone bursts out laughing, showing the benefits of his friendship with Pinky.
7	7	"Napoleon Brainaparte"	Audu Paden	John Loy and Peter Hastings	November 26, 1995	3.1
Everyone in France is anticipating Napoleon Bonaparte returning from war and Pinky remarks Napoleon's conquests have been so many that he may conquer the world before him and Brain. Brain plans to destroy France with exploding crepes, causing Bonaparte to have to abandon his military adventures to turn all his attention towards reconstruction. Things come to a head when Brain is mistaken for Napoleon. As the imposter Emperor, Brain now rules France, but mustn't forget his original plan.
8	8	"A Pinky and the Brain Christmas"	Rusty Mills	Peter Hastings	December 13, 1995	5.5
While Pinky happily decorates the lab for Christmas and sings "Deck The Halls", Brain builds a toy based on him called a "Noodle Noggin Doll", which has the power to hypnotize people so he can order the world to obey him. Taking a job as one of Santa's elves, he puts the doll on every Christmas list in the world, so that every household receives a doll from Santa. When the time comes to switch the machine on, Pinky is horrified to find that his letter to Santa was not given to him and gets upset, but Brain is too concerned with his plan to be interested and forces Pinky to man the equipment. However, just before the machine is switched on, Brain reads Pinky's letter to Santa, which praises Brain despite the fact that he cannot succeed, and asks Santa to give all of Pinky's presents to Brain (along with the world itself, if Santa has it in his sack). Brain, overwhelmed with remorse for his attitude towards his best pal, breaks down in tears and merely orders the world to have a Merry Christmas, after which he smashes the machine in a fit of rage. Back at Acme Labs, Brain gives Pinky a spell checker for Christmas and Pinky gives Brain a key chain of Earth, for which both mice are truly grateful (though Brain is not entirely taken with Pinky's rendition of "Joy to the World"). This episode won the Primetime Emmy Award for Outstanding Animated Program in 1996.
9	9	"Snowball"	Audu Paden	Wendell Morris, Tom Sheppard and Peter Hastings	January 20, 1996	2.7
Brain conducts a chain letter scheme that will make him the ruler of the world by simply including a final sentence spelling "you will bow before the Brain" backwards. But unknown to the pair, the Brain's childhood friend (now his worst enemy), Snowball (a genetically altered lab hamster), has been spying on them and stolen Brain's plan. Brain becomes frustrated and creates a new holiday (Wink Martindale Day) that closes the post office, thus preventing Snowball from mailing the chain letters. Snowball then tries to convince Pinky that Brain is only using him (and offers him fudge), but Pinky refuses to believe him. Later, Snowball buys out the world with his incredible wealth that he has had Bill Grates, the world's richest nerd (a parody of Bill Gates) and leader of Microsponge (a parody of Microsoft) sign over to him, and builds a Pinky-themed amusement park. Pinky begins to consider Snowball's offer, to which Brain replies, not knowing about Snowball's talk with Pinky, "Oh, go ahead, Pinky, I don't need you. What, do you think I just have you around so I can steal your brilliant ideas and claim them as my own? That I'm just using you? Oh, yes, I'm using you for your brilliance." Pinky, unable to distinguish that Brain is just being sarcastic again, accepts Snowball's offer, but eventually ends up missing Brain terribly. The episode ends when Brain snaps and challenges Snowball to a fight, ultimately defeating his foe.
10	10	"Around the World in 80 Narfs"	Liz Holzman and Al Zegler	Gordon Bressack and Charles M. Howell IV	February 3, 1996	3.7
In a parody of Around the World in Eighty Days, Brain attempts to circumnavigate the globe in 79 days to become the president of the Pompous Explorers Club, a position that typically leads to becoming the prime minister of the United Kingdom. Pinky and Brain travel east around the world and reach New York, and only need to take an already scheduled ship to Great Britain to secure Brain's position as Prime Minister. But upon catching a cab to the pier, the driver only speaks 'New York Cabbie', the one language that Pinky's guidebook does not contain, so Brain loses the challenge.
11	11	"Fly"	Liz Holzman and Al Zegler	Peter Hastings and John Loy	February 11, 1996	2.9
Brain buys out all real estate above the 39th floor, and then he and Pinky travel to the Hubble Space Telescope in an attempt to melt the ice caps and flood the Earth.
12a	12a	"Ambulatory Abe"	Charles Visser	Tom Minton	February 25, 1996	3.4
Brain converts the statue of Abraham Lincoln in the Lincoln Memorial into a robot to make people believe that Lincoln has returned and that he will be returned to power immediately.
12b	12b	"Mouse of La Mancha"	Charles Visser	Gordon Bressack and Charles M. Howell IV	February 25, 1996	3.4
Brain tells the story of "Don Cerebro", a mouse with plans to take over the world in a parody of Man of La Mancha.
13a	13a	"The Third Mouse"	Charles Visser	Gordon Bressack and Charles M. Howell IV	May 12, 1996	1.6
In a parody of The Third Man, Pinky searches for Brain in post-World War II Vienna, despite constant attempts to convince him that Brain is dead.
13b	13b	"The Visit"	Charles Visser	Peter Hastings	May 12, 1996	1.6
While attempting to lure white mice into the lab for his latest plan, Brain discovers two that are his parents and immediately creates devices to give them intelligence, but his parents drive him off the deep end and he finally sends them to Florida, tricking them into thinking that the trip is only a vacation.

=== Season 2 (1996–97) ===
No. overall	No. in season	Title	Directed by	Written by	Original release date
14	1	"It's Only a Paper World"	Liz Holzman	Brett Baer and David Finkel	September 7, 1996
Brain creates a papier-mâché copy of the Earth, and lures the entire population to it with free T-shirts to take over the real Earth. However, a meteor collides with the real Earth, forcing the mice to flee to "Chia Earth" to narrowly avoid its complete destruction.
15a	2a	"Collect 'Em All"	Kirk Tingblad	Charles M. Howell IV and Rich Fogel	September 14, 1996
Brain uses the Gutenberg printing press to create a series of collectible cards that will cause children to fall under his control when they collect the whole set.
15b	2b	"Pinkasso"	Charles Visser	Tom Sheppard and Wendell Morris	September 14, 1996
Brain uses Pinky's new fame as an artist to finance his latest plan for world domination.
16	3	"Plan Brain from Outer Space"	Al Zegler	Nick DuBois, Earl Kress and Tom Sheppard	September 28, 1996
Brain goes to Area 5.1 (a parody of Area 51), and makes contact with the alien Zalgar in hopes that he will help him take over the world, but Zalgar has other plans in mind: specifically, devouring Brain's brain.
17	4	"The Pink Candidate"	Russell Calabrese	Reid Harrison	November 2, 1996
After Pinky writes a misunderstood letter to the newspaper complaining about The Family Circus, he is elected President of the United States and Brain uses Pinky's position to try to take over the world.
18	5	"Brain's Song"	Liz Holzman	Brett Baer and David Finkel	November 9, 1996
Brain attempts to make the ultimate emotional movie and to take over the world while the world is in tears, but the vibrating of the electric football machine Brain used in the movie causes him to vibrate uncontrollably, making him the world's biggest joke.
19	6	"Welcome to the Jungle"	Rusty Mills	Gene Laufenberg	November 16, 1996
The mice are mistaken for monkeys by animal activists and are released into the jungle. While trying to return to Acme Labs, they encounter Snowball, who is misleading a tribe of tourists into believing he is "the Wise One". Brain manages to defeat Snowball, but just as he gets used to the natural setting, he and Pinky are recaptured as specimens for Acme Labs.
20a	7a	"A Little Off the Top"	Charles Visser	Gordon Bressack and Charles M. Howell IV	November 23, 1996
Brain attempts to use the miraculous strength properties of Samson's hair for his own benefit.
20b	7b	"Megalomaniacs Anonymous"	Nelson Recinos	Charles M. Howell IV and Bill Matheny	November 23, 1996
Brain decides that he is tired of trying to take over the world, and joins a support group for others that have done the same, but convinces himself that his megalomaniacal attempts are not an obsession.
21a	8a	"The Mummy"	Kirk Tingblad	Wendell Morris and Tom Sheppard	December 28, 1996
Pinky and Brain pose as pharaohs to be "discovered" by explorers in the Egyptian pyramids.
21b	8b	"Robin Brain"	Kirk Tingblad	Deanna Oliver	December 28, 1996
Pinky and Brain pose as "Robin Brain" and his Mallard Men. They steal from the rich and keep all the money for themselves.
22a	9a	"Two Mice and a Baby"	Kirk Tingblad	Story by : Shaun McLaughlin; Teleplay by : Shaun McLaughlin and Charles M. Howell IV	February 1, 1997
Pinky and Brain try to raise a superpowered baby that they found in a rocket that was launched from a doomed alien world.
22b	9b	"The Maze"	Kirk Tingblad	Wendell Morris, Tom Sheppard, Charles M. Howell IV and Earl Kress	February 1, 1997
Pinky and Brain must navigate a difficult and dangerous maze in Acme Labs to retrieve a microchip critical for Brain's latest plan to take over the world.
23	10	"Brain of the Future"	Nelson Recinos	Brian Swenlin	February 8, 1997
Pinky and Brain are visited by their future selves, who give them a kit for Back to the Future world domination from a future where intelligent cockroaches have taken over the world.
24	11	"Brinky"	Kirk Tingblad	David Fury and Elin Hampton	February 22, 1997
Brain attempts to create an army of Brain clones, but when Pinky's DNA gets mixed up in the process, the two discover a mouse that is the genetic child of both mice, which Brain names "Roman Numeral One", or Romy for short. Brain tries to educate Romy in the ways of world domination, while Pinky overly mothers him, causing Romy to leave the two to become a ventriloquist.
25	12	"Hoop Schemes"	Nelson Recinos	Brett Baer and David Finkel	May 17, 1997
Pinky helps Brain assemble a celebrity basketball team as part of Brain's latest plan to take over the world, but fires every single one of them (including Pinky), causing the once-adoring fans to bitterly despise him after he ends up injuring most of the other team.

=== Season 3 (1997–98) ===
No. overall	No. in season	Title	Directed by	Written by	Original release date	Viewers (millions)
26a	1a	"Leave It to Beavers"	Liz Holzman and Russell Calabrese	Wayne Kaatz and Charles M. Howell IV	September 6, 1997	N/A
Brain attempts to communicate with a pack of beavers to control the flow of a river and threaten the humans under his control.
26b	1b	"Cinebrainia"	Liz Holzman and Russell Calabrese	Wendell Morris and Tom Sheppard	September 6, 1997	N/A
Pinky and Brain became silent film comedy stars, but when they switch from comedy to drama, people get tired of their movies.
27	2	"Brain Noir"	Charles Visser	Wendell Morris and Tom Sheppard	September 13, 1997	N/A
In a film noir spoof, Pinky and Brain run into Billie, who uses her charm to fool them into thinking that she needs help when she is really working for Snowball. At the end, she tosses Snowball and Brain over the edge of the waterslide that she built for Pinky; Brain because he loves the world too much to care about her, and Snowball for making her take voice lessons in an effort to make her lose her squawky, "Pinky-like" tone.
28a	3a	"Pinky & the Brain... and Larry"	Russell Calabrese and Liz Holzman	Gordon Bressack and Charles M. Howell IV	September 13, 1997	N/A
Pinky, Brain and Larry develop a formula for the Synchrono Plastic Remote Controller, which is intended to control garage door openers so that people will be forced to use bikes and the petroleum industry will be ruined. Unfortunately, a gyroscopic transducer chip is needed to complete the device, so Pinky, Brain and Larry pose as wallpaper hangers in the White House in order for Brain to get close to the President. Things quickly descend into madness until a butler throws them out. Back at the lab, Brain works out the problem with their teamwork. Larry leaves in a huff at the end of the episode to become a singer.
28b	3b	"Where the Deer and the Mousealopes Play"	Russell Calabrese and Liz Holzman	Wendell Morris and Tom Sheppard	September 13, 1997	N/A
Pinky and Brain pose as the last two individuals of an endangered species, the mousealope, to take over a large amount of land near Pittsburgh for their own.
29a	4a	"Brain's Bogie"	Nelson Recinos	Reid Harrison	September 15, 1997	N/A
Brain joins a golf tournament to steal a special golf club from a competitor to use in his latest world domination plan.
29b	4b	"Say What, Earth?"	Nelson Recinos	Gene Laufenberg	September 15, 1997	N/A
Brain manages to communicate with Earth directly with a new device and attempts to use the ability to take over the world, but Earth turns on him and tries to destroy him. Pinky convinces it not to and sends the device into outer space, bringing the moon to life.
30	5	"My Feldmans, My Friends"	Charles Visser	Brett Baer and Dave Finkel	September 16, 1997	N/A
Brain must recover a critical part of the device for his latest plan to take over the world from his packrat neighbor, Mr. Sultana Sultana, whom the part was accidentally delivered to, to prevent a lightning strike from destroying Earth. To do so, Pinky and Brain must pose as a married couple, resulting in Mr. Sultana becoming romantically attracted to Pinky as the housewife. Brain is eventually able to recover the part and save the world, but his device is destroyed as a result.
31a	6a	"All You Need Is Narf"	Kirk Tingblad	Bill Matheny, Charles M. Howell IV and Earl Kress	September 17, 1997	N/A
Pinky becomes a guru in 1960s India, which Brain tries to exploit in his latest plan to take over the world.
31b	6b	"Pinky's Plan"	Kirk Tingblad	Cathy Shambley and Earl Kress	September 17, 1997	N/A
Pinky actually succeeds in talking certain powerful world leaders into handing over control of the world to Brain on his birthday as a surprise, but when Pinky hands over the "key to the world" to Brain, Brain ruins it by repulsing the leaders with his anger and rudeness, only realizing that the world was finally his after it is entirely too late.
32	7	"This Old Mouse"	Charles Visser	Bill Canterbury	September 18, 1997	N/A
In a cold open skit, Brain declares the program will be moving in a more serious direction without slapstick... until Pinky accidentally trips Brain. Brain develops a machine that can see into the future and sees that he will never rule the world. He gives up trying to take over the world and becomes a ski instructor. Back at the lab, Pinky finds a yam given to him by Mr. Sultana and uses the yam to replace Brain. Using virtual reality helmets, Pinky and the yam foresee Brain's death in an avalanche and then Pinky tries to save Brain and change the future. They succeed in saving Brain, who deduces that the future can be changed.
33	8	"Brain Storm"	Russell Calabrese	John P. McCann	September 19, 1997	N/A
Brain tries to take control of tornadoes as part of his latest plan to take over the world.
34a	9a	"A Meticulous Analysis of History"	Kirk Tingblad	Earl Kress, Charles M. Howell IV, Wendell Morris, Tom Sheppard and Jed Spingarn	September 20, 1997	N/A
Brain and Pinky sing about famous history leaders and their downfalls and how Brain will learn from their failures.
34b	9b	"Funny, You Don't Look Rhennish"	Kirk Tingblad	Jed Spingarn	September 20, 1997	N/A
Brain and Pinky must pose as Rhennish farmers to gain access to a key mineral for Brain's latest plan to take over the world. However, Brain finds out that there is only the "fool's" version of the mineral in the region.
35	10	"The Pinky Protocol"	Kirk Tingblad	Rich Fogel	September 22, 1997	N/A
Brain makes people think that the government is hiding a document declaring him ruler of the world (which he calls the "Pinky Protocol"), and when a nutjob named Big Jake from northern Virginia tries to rescue him, he only makes matters worse by keeping him in his cabin with nothing but "enough Spam to last the turn of the century" to eat. It is soon discovered that a picture that Brain pasted his own photo over is really one of Joyce DeWitt, who then becomes ruler of the world herself.
36a	11a	"Mice Don't Dance"	Russell Calabrese	Tom Minton	September 26, 1997	N/A
Brain develops mechanical tap-dancing legs to tap out a subliminal message while he dances at the World's Fair.
36b	11b	"Brain Drained"	Russell Calabrese	Wendell Morris and Tom Sheppard	September 26, 1997	N/A
Brain runs out of ideas for world domination and seeks input from screenwriters for inspiration.
37	12	"Brain Acres"	Nelson Recinos	Charles M. Howell IV, Earl Kress, Wendell Morris and Tom Sheppard	September 27, 1997	N/A
Brain grows an army of giant, animated vegetables to take over the world.
38a	13a	"Pinky and the Brainmaker"	Russell Calabrese	Norman McCabe	September 29, 1997	N/A
Brain creates a cloning machine to create an army that will take over the world through Celtic dance. Pinky puts in a picture of only himself by mistake and creates his own cloned dance troop. The dancing Brains and Pinkys have a dance-off, ultimately requiring Brain to abandon that plan altogether, but his clones turn on him, revealing that this plan was only a dream.
38b	13b	"Calvin Brain"	Russell Calabrese	Rich Fogel, Earl Kress and Charles M. Howell IV	September 29, 1997	N/A
Brain becomes a fashion designer to get everyone to wear his perfume "Subjugation", which has hypnotic properties.
39a	14a	"Pinky Suavo"	Mike Milo	Wendell Morris and Tom Sheppard	October 4, 1997	N/A
Brain uses the Personalitron to inherit the world's most attractive personas of various celebrities, but Pinky ends up going into the machine instead. He is then transformed into "Pinky Suavo", a more suave version of himself. Pinky gains control of people's attention, and Brain finds a way to use it to his advantage and puts Pinky on a talk show. But he finds out that bopping him on the head will deplete the effects and this actually "breaks" him. Brain asks for a break and takes Pinky back to the Personalitron. Pinky looks changed but, at the end, it is discovered that the Brain put in a picture of the Unknown Comic instead of the celebrities.
39b	14b	"T.H.E.Y."	Mike Milo	Wendell Morris and Tom Sheppard	October 4, 1997	N/A
Pinky and Brain attempt to gain membership into a secret, world-controlling organization. The mice manage to complete the hazing rituals, but only Pinky is accepted into the group because Brain cannot take any more of the members' (who are various world leaders) shenanigans. As it turns out, the organization is only an excuse for the members to watch the only complete collection of The Three Morons short films whenever they want to.
40	15	"The Real Life"	Kirk Tingblad	Jed Spingarn	October 10, 1997	N/A
Brain must take part along with Pinky in a reality television program to be able to set up a radio tower near Cleveland at the precise spot needed for his latest plan to take over the world to work. While Pinky fits in perfectly, the rest of the house guests find Brain obnoxious and that he was taking money from the house funds, so they sell off all of his gear in a garage sale. He intends to broadcast to the world the last remaining copy of the Rush Limbaugh singing album, which is so horrible that the world will submit to him to get him to turn it off, but Limbaugh buys it and then destroys it.
41	16	"Brain's Way"	Nelson Recinos	Wendell Morris and Tom Sheppard	October 11, 1997	N/A
In 1962, Brain opens a casino and becomes a lounge singer to attract people. However, he only offers baccarat, and runs into financial and mortal danger from his funding source. The lender he borrowed from turns out to be a loan shark and takes Acme Labs into custody until, turning it into a lounge, Brain can repay her.
42	17	"A Pinky and the Brain Halloween"	Kirk Tingblad	Wendell Morris and Tom Sheppard	October 19, 1997	3.05
Mr. Itch (the Devil) offers to give Brain the world in exchange for his soul. Brain refuses, but finds out later that Pinky has taken the deal. Snowball appears as his court jester, attempting to make Brain miss Pinky so much that he would look for him, thus leaving him in charge. Brain enters a rhythmic gymnastics competition with Mr. Itch and loses, when Pinky points out that Mr. Itch was actually unable to fulfill his part of the deal (due to not knowing what an object Pinky had requested as part of the deal actually was), making the entire deal null and void.
43	18	"Brainy Jack"	Charles Visser	Brett Baer, Dave Finkel and Earl Kress	November 1, 1997	N/A
Brain becomes a hippie leader and encourages people to form a human chain across America to send a subliminal message.
44a	19a	"Leggo My Ego"	Charles Visser	Jed Spingarn	November 7, 1997	N/A
Brain tries to hypnotize Sigmund Freud, but Pinky accidentally leaves Brain's mirrored glasses behind.
44b	19b	"Big in Japan"	Charles Visser	Jed Spingarn	November 7, 1997	N/A
Brain becomes a sumo wrestler to obtain a rare Japanese fish as part of his latest plan to take over the world.
45	20	"But That's Not All, Folks!"	Nelson Recinos	John Ludin	November 8, 1997	N/A
Pinky and Brain sell a product via infomercials to gain a large database of addresses to be used in Brain's latest plan to take over the world.
46a	21a	"Operation: Sea Lion"	Kirk Tingblad	John P. McCann	November 14, 1997	N/A
Brain learns to communicate with sea lions to create an aquatic army.
46b	21b	"You Said a Mouseful"	Kirk Tingblad	Gordon Bressack	November 14, 1997	N/A
Brain attempts to put helium in shoes in a factory, which fails because he cannot accurately tell Pinky what to do.
47a	22a	"The Tailor and the Mice"	Mike Milo	Tom Ruegger	November 15, 1997	N/A
Pinky and Brain are unfortunate recipients of a tailor's well-meaning ways.
47b	22b	"Bah, Wilderness"	Mike Milo	Jed Spingarn	November 15, 1997	N/A
Brain attempts to become the top camp councilor at "Camp Davey", a summer camp for world leaders' children, by taking out all the other camp councilors. However, as soon as he is able to become the top councilor, the children of the world leaders have completed their time at camp, and now the children of the world's vice-presidents are attending, much to Brain's dismay.
48a	23a	"Pinky at the Bat"	Nelson Recinos	Bill Braunstein and Gordon Bressack	November 22, 1997	N/A
Pinky and Brain became baseball players and lead their team to victory so that Brain can release a special perfume on the pitcher's mound at the right time. The victory celebration prevents Brain from completing his latest plan to take over the world. While leading a losing team to a winning season, both mice are kicked off the team.
48b	23b	"Schpiel-borg 2000"	Rusty Mills	Rob Davies	November 22, 1997	N/A
Brain creates a robotic replica of Steven Spielberg as part of his world domination plan. It is revealed that it is only a robot and Brain comes to tell Pinky off. Pinky accidentally presses a button, and the robot goes into "Schpiel-mode", where it recreates scenes from various films, including one from Jurassic Park, during which the robot gets up and walks through a brick wall out onto a bridge and explodes.
49	24	"Broadway Malady"	Russell Calabrese	Gordon Bressack and Charles M. Howell IV	January 3, 1998	N/A
Brain attempts to get a musical on Broadway, but is surprised to find that Pinky's musical is more popular.
50a	25a	"The Megalomaniacal Adventures of Brainie the Poo"	Charles Visser	Patric M. Verrone	February 7, 1998	N/A
Brain (as Brainie the Poo) and Pinky (as Pinklet) attempt to steal honey from a beehive so they can secretly replace the world's artificial sweeteners with it and render everyone fat, slow, and toothless in a parody of Walt Disney Studios' Winnie the Pooh cartoons.
50b	25b	"The Melancholy Brain"	Charles Visser	Gordon Bressack and Patric M. Verrone	February 7, 1998	N/A
Brain attempts to take over the royal family of Denmark by causing havoc with Hamlet.
51	26	"Inherit the Wheeze"	Nelson Recinos	Story by : Tom Ruegger and Earl Kress; Teleplay by : Earl Kress	February 14, 1998	N/A
Brain attempts to use a tobacco company to take over the world by selling cigarettes to children. However, Pinky becomes disgusted at what Brain is trying to do and convinces him to double-cross the tobacco company. Note: The episode later won a PRISM Award for Best Children's Animated Television Episode for its anti-smoking message.
52a	27a	"Brain's Night Off"	Kirk Tingblad	Charles M. Howell IV, Wendell Morris and Tom Sheppard	February 21, 1998	N/A
Brain decides not to try to take over the world for one night and enjoys a night out with Pinky. Brain's inadvertent actions in complaining about the service he gets ends up with people wanting him to become their leader, but their desires fail to register with Brain.
52b	27b	"Beach Blanket Brain"	Kirk Tingblad	Wendell Morris and Tom Sheppard	February 21, 1998	N/A
Brain becomes a surfer to get other surfers to wear his hypnotic suntan lotion.
53	28	"The Family That Poits Together, Narfs Together"	Russell Calabrese	Earl Kress, Charles M. Howell IV and John Ludin	February 21, 1998	N/A
Brain helps to reunite Pinky's family to win a television show's cash prize. Tracking down his family and then using the gene-splicing machine that gave the two mice their intelligence, Brain finds that Pinky's family are just as insane as Pinky is. Brain is barely able to control Pinky's family and is disappointed to find out that the prize is not what he expected it to be.
54a	29a	"Pinky's Turn"	Russell Calabrese	Jed Spingarn	February 28, 1998	N/A
Frustrated with his failures, Brain lets Pinky try to take over the world (with surprising success) until Brain takes control and ruins everything.
54b	29b	"Your Friend: Global Domination"	Russell Calabrese	Gordon Bressack	February 28, 1998	N/A
Brain attempts to sway schoolchildren by creating an educational video.
55	30	"You'll Never Eat Food Pellets in This Town Again!"	Russell Calabrese	Story by : Peter Hastings; Teleplay by : Charles M. Howell IV and Jed Spingarn	April 25, 1998	N/A
Pinky and Brain quit the show. When Brain falls back onto Pinky's attempts to get some work, he is given a job blowing up balloons at a children's birthday party, but is kicked out. It is revealed that Brain is married to Billie (who in real life is Sheila and hates playing Billie), who pretty much only agreed to because he is famous, and eventually kicks him out and makes Brain live in his restaurant. In the end, Brain wakes up and realizes that it is all a bad dream.
56	31	"Dangerous Brains"	Mike Milo	Brett Baer, Dave Finkel and Tom Ruegger	May 2, 1998	N/A
Brain takes a job as a teacher at a troubled school to earn money for his latest plan to take over the world and Pinky, disguised as one of the students, convinces the other classmates to take the studies seriously.
57a	32a	"Whatever Happened to Baby Brain"	Charles Visser	Jed Spingarn	May 9, 1998	N/A
Brain poses as a child actress to gain public admiration.
57b	32b	"Just Say Narf"	Charles Visser	Bill Canterbury and Gordon Bressack	May 9, 1998	N/A
Pinky sings a song to try to cheer Brain up.
58a	33a	"The Pinky P.O.V."	Mike Milo	Gordon Bressack	May 16, 1998	N/A
Brain's latest plan for world domination is shown from Pinky's perspective.
58b	33b	"The Really Great Dictator"	Mike Milo	Liz Holzman	May 16, 1998	N/A
Pinky and Brain sing about world domination.
58c	33c	"Brain Food"	Mike Milo	Bill Braunstein and Gordon Bressack	May 16, 1998	N/A
Brain attempts to increase the intelligence of the population to make the population understand why he should be their leader by opening a restaurant to feed them an intelligence-increasing drug.

=== Season 4 (1998) ===
No. overall	No. in season	Title	Directed by	Written by	Original release date
59	1	"Brainwashed: Part 1 - Brain Brain Go Away"	Kirk Tingblad	Wendell Morris and Tom Sheppard	September 14, 1998
Pinky and Brain are in the midst of preparing a plan to take over the world involving a control chip on celebrity Tom Bodett. However, things hit a snag because of a new dance craze which is making people stupid. A White House conference is called to find a solution. Brain is mistakenly invited. He and Pinky head off to Washington, thinking the conference is in Brain's honor. Suddenly, an evil clown steals the speech Brain was giving. As the mice are leaving, they are pursued and captured. After Brain's mind is erased, they are imprisoned in the Land of Hats, ruled by the Top Hat.
60	2	"Brainwashed: Part 2 - I Am Not a Hat"	Kirk Tingblad	Wendell Morris and Tom Sheppard	September 15, 1998
Weirdness in the "Land of Hats" continues for Pinky and an amnesic Brain. With Pinky's help, Brain is able to regain his memory and outwit the Top Hat, after which they manage to escape. By examining files taken from the Top Hat, Brain learns that the dance was created to make people stupid, is part of a plan for world domination and that he and Pinky were imprisoned for refusing to dance it. Downloading the information causes a self-destruct sequence in the laboratory. Brain heads out in search of the one person (besides him) who could be behind such a scheme to conquer the world: Snowball. Brain sets off for Microsponge, Inc., which is owned by Snowball. However, Brain finds him locked away in his own mental institution. Brain reluctantly agrees to get Snowball out if he will help them, but ends up imprisoned next to him as an inmate. To save the world, therefore, the mice must team up with Snowball.
61	3	"Brainwashed: Part 3 - Wash Harder"	Russell Calabrese	Wendell Morris and Tom Sheppard	September 16, 1998
After Brain and Snowball escape from the mental institution, they and Pinky set out to find the mastermind and save the world. They travel to the deserted island of the geneticist who created the gene splicer which made Brain and Snowball super-intelligent. They discover that he was also a victim of the dance and find the true mastermind: the geneticist's transformed cat, Precious. She leaves all three of them on a conveyor belt leading to the gene splicer, but the mice escape and only Snowball is left to go into the machine, causing him to lose his intelligence and become a normal hamster. Pinky and the Brain are left to stop Precious before the great anthem for world peace in Washington D.C. takes place, making Earth's population permanently stupid. Brain saves the world by creating a new verse to the dance, which reverses the effect.
62a	4a	"To Russia with Lab Mice"	Nelson Recinos	Charles M. Howell IV, Earl Kress and John Ludin	September 21, 1998
Pinky and Brain are shipped to Russia as part of a toy testing project and meet a Russian spy mouse who has a part critical to Brain's plan.
62b	4b	"Hickory Dickory Bonk"	Nelson Recinos	Earl Kress	September 21, 1998
Brain attempts to make every clock in the world chime simultaneously.
63	5	"The Pinky and the Brain Reunion Special"	Charles Visser	Gordon Bressack and Jed Spingarn	September 21, 1998
Brain concocts a reunion special to attract viewers who he can then brainwash with his latest device.
64a	6a	"A Legendary Tail"	Nelson Recinos	Charles M. Howell IV, Earl Kress and Jed Spingarn	September 28, 1998
Brain attempts to create a tall tale to earn world renown.
64b	6b	"Project B.R.A.I.N."	Nelson Recinos	Gordon Bressack	September 28, 1998
This episode tells the story of Brain's first plan for world domination.
65	7	"Star Warners"	Nelson Recinos	Liz Holzman, Charles M. Howell IV and Tom Ruegger	November 14, 1998
Pinky and the Brain (cast as parodies of the Star Wars saga's droids C-3PO and R2-D2, respectively) plan to use the "Mega Star" for their world domination plans. The episode, itself a parody of Star Wars: Episode IV – A New Hope, also features other Animaniacs characters as parodies of other Star Wars characters, including Yakko as Han Solo, Wakko as Luke Skywalker, Dot as Princess Leia, Thaddeus Plotz as Darth Vader, and Slappy and Skippy as Obi-Wan Kenobi and Yoda, respectively. Although, technically, Yoda was not introduced until Star Wars: Episode V - The Empire Strikes Back.
