= List of Freakazoid! episodes =

Freakazoid! is an American animated series that lasted 24 episodes in two seasons from 1995 to 1997. Freakazoid! lasted one complete season and part of a second season on its premiere network, Kids' WB, from September 9, 1995, until February 14, 1997, when it was cancelled due to low ratings. However, the show was later picked up by Cartoon Network and rebroadcast from April 5, 1997 to March 29, 2003.

This list shows both seasons. The episodes here are organized by the air dates in which the episodes were shown with their segments in their originally produced order (for example, the episode "Statuesque" actually premiered on November 29, 1996, with its respective segments in a different order, but its airdate is given as June 6, 1997, the airdate in which it was shown with its segments in the original order).

== Series overview ==
Season	Segments	Episodes	Originally released	
Season	Segments	Episodes	First released	Last released
1	36	13	September 9, 1995	February 17, 1996
2	13	11	September 7, 1996	June 1, 1997

== Episodes ==
=== Season 1 (1995–96) ===
The segments indicate in colors by which characters starred in them:

- Blue = Toby Danger (1 segment)
- Orange = Lord Bravery (2 segments)
- Red = The Lawn Gnomes (1 segment)
- Green = The Huntsman (2 segments)
- Purple = Fatman and Boy Blubber (1 segment)

No. overall	No. in season	Title	Directed by	Written by	Original release date
1	1	"Five Day Forecast"	–	–	September 9, 1995
1	1	"Dance of Doom"	Ronaldo Carmen	John P. McCann	September 9, 1995
1	1	"Handman"	Jack Heiter	Tom Ruegger	September 9, 1995
(1.) Freakazoid announces the day's weather, getting more and more overexcited as he mentions more and more dangerous weather. He then comically calms down. (2.) Cave Guy invades a school dance at Dexter's school and takes hostages, leaving one hero to save the day. Unfortunately, that hero is on another network and thus Freakazoid must save the day. (3.) In an installment of The Sidekick Chronicles, Freakazoid introduces the network to his new "sidekick", Handman, who marries Handgirl.
2	2	"Candle Jack"	Scott Jeralds	Paul Rugg	September 16, 1995
2	2	"Doomsday Bet"	Eric Radomski	Written by : Tom Minton; Storyboarded by : Brian B. Chin and Butch Lukic	September 16, 1995
2	2	"The Lobe"	Scott Jeralds	Tom Ruegger	September 16, 1995
(1.) Presented in Scream-O-Vision. On a camping trip to Camp Wennamigunnagohome with Steff, Freakazoid runs into the ghostly villain Candle Jack, who kidnaps and ties up anyone who says his name. (2.) In a parody of Jonny Quest, the Danger family must stop a mad scientist from using the world's largest semiconductor to take over the world. (3.) The Lobe operates on a captured Freakazoid to figure out "what makes him tick", only to be blown up by a bomb from Freakazoid's head.
3	3	"Mo-Ron"	–	Tom Ruegger	September 23, 1995
3	3	"The Sewer Rescue"	Dan Riba	Paul Rugg	September 23, 1995
3	3	"The Big Question"	–	Tom Ruegger	September 23, 1995
3	3	"The Legends Who Lunch"	Directed and created by : Dan Riba	Tom Ruegger	September 23, 1995
(1.) A UFO arrives in Washington, D.C., proving the existence of 'unintelligent' life on other planets. (2.) Lord Bravery answers a call for help from a rather unpleasant location. (3.) Another alien arrives on Earth looking for the answer to a crucial question. Afterwards, Mo-Ron tries to remember his message. (4.) Several retired superheroes tell stories about their adventures.
4	4	"And Fanboy Is His Name"	Scott Jeralds	Paul Dini	September 30, 1995
4	4	"Lawn Gnomes: Chapter IV – Fun in the Sun"	Turk Flipnutt	John McCann	September 30, 1995
4	4	"Frenching with Freakazoid"	–	–	September 30, 1995
(1.) After Freakazoid's sidekick Expendable Lad is hospitalized following a fight with Milk Man, Fanboy desires to become Freakazoid's new sidekick, whether he likes it or not. (2.) The origins of the prankish Lawn Gnomes are told as Freakazoid does commentary on it. (3.) Freakazoid teaches how to say the words in French: "Qui a coupé le fromage?" (Who cut the cheese?)
5	5	"In Stereo Where Available"	–	–	October 7, 1995
5	5	"Foamy the Freakadog"	Ronaldo Carmen	Paul Dini	October 7, 1995
5	5	"Office Visit"	Eric Radomski	Paul Rugg	October 7, 1995
5	5	"An Ode to Leonard Nimoy"	–	–	October 7, 1995
5	5	"Emergency Broadcast System"	–	–	October 7, 1995
5	5	"Conversational Norwegian"	–	–	October 7, 1995
(1.) Joe Leahy informs the viewers that Freakazoid is in stereo as they are shown a rotating view of a neighborhood with a Freakazoid! billboard. (2.) In an installment of The Sidekick Chronicles, Freakazoid remembers his rabid dog sidekick Foamy and how he kept attacking him during missions. (3.) Lord Bravery struggles with bureaucracy when he learns that a bakery is already using his name. (4.) Fanboy shares a poem about his attempts to get Leonard Nimoy's autograph. (5.) Freakazoid does an EBS test with his voice, and almost passes out in the process. (6.) Freakazoid goes Scandinavian and teaches how to identify the narwhal in its own language.
6	6	"The Chip" (Part 1)	Dan Riba	Paul Rugg	November 4, 1995
In this origin story presented by Jack Valenti, Dexter Douglas gets the new Pinnacle Chip for his computer that was created by Roddy MacStew. Dexter's pet cat Mr. Chubbikins steps on the keyboard and enters the secret combination of letters and numbers that sucks Dexter into the computer when he hits the "delete" key, turning him into Freakazoid. This causes him and Roddy to be targeted by the evil Armando Guitierrez and his minions.
7	7	"The Chip" (Part 2)	Dan Riba	Paul Rugg	November 11, 1995
7	7	"Freakazoid Is History!"	Dan Riba	Alan Burnett	November 11, 1995
(1.) Continued from Part 1, Dexter unleashes Freakazoid for the first time in defeating Guitierrez. (2.) A strange mishap sends Freakazoid back in time to Pearl Harbor in World War II. Can Freakazoid's sense of justice alter history itself? Can he take his eyes off the hula girls long enough to do so?
8	8	"Hot Rods from Heck!"	Ronaldo Carmen	John P. McCann	November 18, 1995
8	8	"A Time for Evil"	Jack Heiter	John P. McCann	November 18, 1995
8	8	"Freakmobile Toy Line"	–	–	November 18, 1995
(1.) Freakazoid has to stop the evil villain Longhorn from stealing a missile using robot-driven hot rod cars and his super truck. His new Freakmobile - which is featured in a fake in-show ad - helps him save the day, not to mention a special assist from the seventh-inning stretch. (2.) The Huntsman arrives looking for some action. Too bad there is none due to a rookie unknowingly blowing it. (3.) Freakazoid reaps the reward of his prominent use of the Freakmobile in "Hot Rods from Heck!".
9	9	"Relax-O-Vision (Terror on the Midway)"	Scott Jeralds	Paul Dini	November 25, 1995
9	9	"Fatman and Boy Blubber"	Eric Radomski	Tom Ruegger	November 25, 1995
9	9	"Limbo Lock-Up"	–	–	November 25, 1995
9	9	"Terror Palace"	Jack Heiter	John P. McCann	November 25, 1995
(1.) Steff is chased into an alley by the Booger Beast. Freakzoid shows up and Booger Beast sneezes on him, causing him to bail as Steff sarcastically says "My hero!". (2.) The Lobe's super-evil plan coincides with Kids' WB's new network standards to reduce the effect of cartoon violence, much to Freakazoid's dismay as he takes on Cobra Queen, Longhorn, Cave Guy, and Kid Carrion to get to the Lobe. (3.) Fatman and Boy Blubber stand up for a kid's right to have his lunch...at least until they realize that he has a fattening sweet bun and go to extremes to steal it from him. (4.) Freakazoid's odd jumping about and ranting gets him arrested by the Idiot Police. Freakazoid must now choose between 30 days in prison or a fate worse than death: listening to Fanboy's stories. (5.) A false alarm brings the Huntsman out for nothing.
10	10	"In Arms Way"	Dan Riba	Ken Segall	December 16, 1995
10	10	"The Cloud"	Scott Jeralds	Paul Rugg	December 16, 1995
(1.) Freakazoid's Christmas shopping is interrupted by Arms Akimbo's crime spree. (2.) Freakazoid must find out why a mysterious cloud is turning people into clowns.
11	11	"Next Time, Phone Ahead!"	Eric Radomski	Tom Ruegger	February 3, 1996
11	11	"Nerdator"	Jack Heiter	Paul Dini	February 3, 1996
(1.) In a parody of E.T. the Extra-Terrestrial pitched by Steven Spielberg, Freakazoid finds and cares for Mo-Ron, who was accidentally abandoned on Earth, and tries to help him "phone home". (2.) A Predator-like alien abducts Earth nerds (including Dexter) to steal their tech savvy.
12	12	"House of Freakazoid"	Scott Jeralds	Paul Dini	February 10, 1996
12	12	"Sewer or Later"	Ronaldo Carmen	Kate Donahue	February 10, 1996
(1.) A werewolf who somehow knows Dexter's secret identity visits his home to ask his assistance in a cure. (2.) Cobra Queen makes a getaway through the sewers and Freakazoid does not want to go after her because of how bad the sewers smell.
13	13	"The Wrath of Guitierrez"	Scott Jeralds	Paul Rugg	February 17, 1996
Using his authority in jail, Guitierrez manages to escape into the Internet and become a being similar to Freakazoid (but retaining his sanity). He then begins draining power from Freakazoid, prompting him to jump into a trap in the Internet to survive. Using a video game, Guiterrez has Freakazoid fighting for his life, but ultimately is thrown off a castle tower and into the digital abyss of the Internet.

=== Season 2 (1996–97) ===
No. overall	No. in season	Title	Directed by	Written by	Original release date
14	1	"Dexter's Date"	Jack Heiter	Paul Rugg and Alan Burnett	September 7, 1996
Dexter is on a date with Steff at a fancy restaurant, but is forced to leave to deal with the Lobe. However, Freakazoid ends up being electrified by the Lobe's television-stealing machine and is unable to transform back into Dexter and instead turns into different TV personalities, putting his date at risk. When the Lobe later arrives at the same restaurant (in a rousing parody of Hello Dolly!), Freakazoid is forced to ask him for help. Songs: Hello Lobey
15	2	"The Freakazoid"	Rich Arons and Jack Heiter	Paul Rugg	September 14, 1996
In a parody of The Godfather, Freakazoid has to grant all requests made to him on his birthday, and thus cannot stop the Lobe's latest crime spree since he requested to be left alone. This causes the citizens to lose faith in Freakazoid while every other superhero is at a superhero convention on some moon. Wakko Warner and the Brain from Animaniacs guest star. Songs: Wakko's America (briefly), "You're a Meany, Nasty Lobe", "When You Cannot Show Your Face"
16	3	"Mission: Freakazoid"	Rich Arons and David Marshall	John McCann	September 28, 1996
In a parody of Mission: Impossible, Freakazoid and his friends travel to the brutal police state of Vuka Nova to rescue the Douglas family (and the mime from Animaniacs) from Chesky Beresch Prison after they are falsely accused of espionage.
17	4	"Joe's Very Own Story"	–	John P. McCann and Tom Ruegger	November 2, 1996
17	4	"Virtual Freak"	Peter Shin	Melody Fox and John P. McCann	November 2, 1996
(1.) In a callback to the cold opening of episode 5, Joe tells a story about terrible things in the neighborhood in a rotating view like a man-eating plant eating a man, a man fighting his spouse on a ledge while being seduced by his sexy neighbor, Count Dracula on the loose, King Kong on a rampage, and ghosts defacing and pushing over the Freakazoid! billboard. The Network Censor objects to this and forces Joe to tell a nicer story. (2.) The Lobe traps Freakazoid and Cosgrove in a virtual reality video game while the characters they were playing as wreak havoc in the real world. While in the video game, Freakazoid and Cosgrove work to maneuver through and escape it while avoiding a Pterodactyl.
18	5	"Hero Boy"	Jack Heiter and Rich Arons	Paul Rugg, Tom Sheppard and Wendell Morris	November 9, 1996
Guitierrez returns (though now with cybernetic implants on the left side of his head due to their previous encounter). After many comical misunderstandings on what Freakazoid's weakness is, Guitierrez tricks him into imprisoning himself in a cage and sends a "Freaka-Clone" out in his place to ruin his reputation.
19	6	"A Matter of Love"	Rich Arons	Paul Rugg and Lisa Malone	November 16, 1996
Cosgrove begins dating cosmetics queen Mary Beth, ignoring Freakazoid in favor of her. As Freakazoid starts filling the hole that Cosgrove left, he notices Mary Beth revealing herself to be a monster. Now Mary Beth wants to take Freakazoid's essence to maintain her youth, and Cosgrove is forced to decide between his friend and his monster of a girlfriend.
20	7	"Statuesque"	Peter Shin	John McCann	November 29, 1996
Waylon Jeepers has finally perfected his Medusa Watch, which turns humans and pigeons into stone. In addition, he has also summoned the monster Vorn the Unspeakable. When Steff gets petrified, Freakazoid must seek a cure.
21	8	"Island of Dr. Mystico"	Rich Arons and David Marshall	Jed Spingarn	February 7, 1997
While flying a plane containing the Lobe, Cave Guy, Longhorn, Candle Jack, and Cobra Queen to a new prison in France, Freakazoid ends up crash-landing on an island. As Candle Jack scares Professor Jones and Cobra Queen helps Steff fix the plane, Freakazoid, Cosgrove, the Lobe, Cave Guy, and Longhorn go out into the jungle to look for provisions, but are abducted by the evil Dr. Mystico and his Orangu-Men. Leonard Maltin guest-stars as himself.
22	9	"Two Against Freak"	Rich Arons and Jack Heiter	Ken Segal	February 14, 1997
Cave Guy and Cobra Queen have joined forces to obtain the Diamond Hat of the Czars, while Freakazoid tries to learn telekinesis with Roddy. However, due to his mental instability, Freakazoid ends up hitting himself in the face repeatedly with bricks, developing a phobia of them in doing so. At the same time, Cosgrove joins the reality show Real Life Police, who follow him around to see how he operates.
23	10	"Freak-a-Panel"	–	–	May 31, 1997
23	10	"Tomb of Invisibo"	Rich Arons and Peter Shin	Written by : Mitch Watson; Story by : John P. McCann	May 31, 1997
(1.) While pursuing Cave Guy at a TV/comic book convention, Freakazoid takes in the sights, discovers to his disappointment that everyone is more interested in Superman than him, and even learns Klingon. After Cave Guy is defeated, Lord Bravery, the Huntsman, Fanboy, and Mo-Ron/Bo-Ron confront Freakazoid about being dropped from the show. (2.) An invisible pharaoh from ancient Egypt is released during the Douglas family's trip to the museum and is causing havoc throughout the world. Songs: Where did he go (That Invis-bo)
24	11	"Normadeus"	Rich Arons and David Marshall	Paul Rugg	June 1, 1997
The Lobe kidnaps Norm Abram and forces him to build a giant wooden horn to destroy Freakazoid. To make his plot interesting, the Lobe invites Cave Guy, Longhorn, Cobra Queen, Waylon Jeepers, Candle Jack, Invisibo, and Guitierrez to a party where he holds a raffle to determine who gets to use the horn to kill Freakazoid. The series ends with the entire cast performing a group rendition of "We'll Meet Again".
