= Debbie Douglas =

Debbie Douglas may refer to:

- Debbie Douglas (The Only Way Is Essex)
- Debbie Douglas (Freakazoid!)
