= A Pinky and the Brain Christmas =

1995 animated television special

- VHS cover
- Created by: Tom Ruegger
- Based on: Pinky and the Brain by Tom Ruegger
- Written by: Peter Hastings
- Directed by: Rusty Mills
- Starring: Rob Paulsen; Maurice LaMarche; Earl Boen; Jeff Bennett
- Theme music composer: Richard Stone
- Composer: Richard Stone
- Country of origin: United States
- Original language: English

Production
- Executive producer: Steven Spielberg
- Producers: Tom Ruegger; Peter Hastings; Rusty Mills
- Running time: 22 minutes
- Production companies: Amblin Entertainment; Warner Bros. Television Animation; Tokyo Movie Shinsha (animation services)

Original release
- Network: The WB
- Release: December 13, 1995

A Pinky and the Brain Christmas is a 1995 animated television special based on the Pinky and the Brain TV series. It is directed by Rusty Mills and features the voices of Rob Paulsen and Maurice LaMarche. It is about the eponymous genetically modified mice, who are bent on world domination, attempting to deceive Santa Claus into delivering hypnotic devices as presents during Christmas.

Although released on DVD with season 1 of the series, A Pinky and the Brain Christmas was originally aired December 13, 1995 on The WB as a prime time special. It won the Primetime Emmy Award for Outstanding Animated Program.

== Plot ==
On Christmas Eve in Acme Labs, Pinky happily decorates the lab for Christmas and writes his Christmas list to Santa Claus, whom he believes in with great faith, while Brain is developing a new hypnotic doll called Noodle Noggin. After successfully testing the doll on Pinky, Brain calculates that by manufacturing and distributing 1 billion Noodle Noggins, the world's population can be hypnotized into accepting Brain as ruler. When Brain spots on an advertisement for jobs at Santa's workshop, he realizes the elves would be ideal to make the dolls, and Santa can deliver them. The mice set off by plane, hiding in a dummy while a female pilot unwittingly flies them to the North Pole, while Pinky continuers to write his list.

Pinky and the Brain disguise themselves as elves and are assigned to the mail room by the surly head elf, Schotzie. The Brain subversively adds a Noodle Noggin to each Christmas list, causing the elves to scramble through their archives looking for the schematics. Eventually, Schotzie realizes Pinky and the Brain are not real elves, and the mice are captured by the workshop staff. The elves discover the Noodle Noggin schematics in the possession of the mice, with Schotzie demanding to know if the mice are spies for the Easter Bunny, the Tooth Fairy, or Herschel the Hanukkah Goblin. The Brain and Pinky then escape and disguise themselves as two reindeer to get a ride back to their home at Acme Labs. The two see Santa approaching his sleigh, but Brain restrains Pinky from giving Santa his Christmas list.

While in flight, the two mice fall from the sleigh into the labs, unintentionally damaging Brain's hypnotic control equipment. As they rush to repair it, Pinky discovers his list was never delivered and breaks down into tears. As Pinky sobs uncontrollably, Brain angrily reads the letter and is surprised to see Pinky asked for nothing for himself, requesting that all of his gifts be delivered to the Brain instead. Brain is deeply moved, and when Pinky informs him the Noodle Noggins are working, Brain is too emotional to demand world domination. He orders everyone to have a Merry Christmas instead, and smashes the equipment in a fit of rage. On Christmas Day, Pinky and the Brain exchange gifts, an Earth-shaped keychain for the Brain and a spell checker for Pinky.

== Production ==
The special was produced by Amblin Entertainment and Warner Bros. Television, based on a teleplay by Peter Hastings and directed by Rusty Mills. Filmmaker Steven Spielberg was credited as the special's executive producer, although author Frank Sanello expressed skepticism Spielberg personally worked on the special each day.

In one scene in the workshop, Pinky reads they are invited to a party at the home of Donner the reindeer, which Brain dismisses with reference to the historical Donner Party. While the cannibalism joke would likely not be understood by younger viewers, voice actor Maurice LaMarche explained that producer Tom Ruegger had once told him, "I want this to be a show, and Steven wants this to be a show, that adults and kids can enjoy together and doesn't talk down to one group or pander to the other".

== Broadcast and release ==
After Pinky and the Brain was spun off from Animaniacs, the series was aired on The WB on Sunday evenings. A Pinky and the Brain Christmas marked the prime time debut, airing on The WB on the night of Wednesday, December 13, 1995 as a special.

A Pinky and the Brain Christmas was later included in the DVD Pinky and the Brain Vol. 1, released by Warner Home Video. The episode was also streamed on Amazon.com in 2016.

== Reception ==
Caryn James, writing for The New York Times, said "The special will give adults only a hint of the series' usual satire". James called the special "endearing", though she felt the series had already produced funnier episodes. The special won the Primetime Emmy Award for Outstanding Animated Program in 1996, and an Annie Award for Best Individual Achievement in Storyboarding.

In 2005, authors Kevin Cuddihy and Phillip Metcalfe named it second in their Christmas-themed list of "Not-so-Classic Cartoons", declaring it "well worth the effort to see it". In 2009, Entertainment Weekly named the special among "15 New(ish) Christmas Classics", calling it "very touching". In 2016, Mary Grace Garis of Bustle wrote that the Emmy win was surprising, crediting it to "Pinky's sweet, simple heart".
