= Rusty Mills =

American animator, director and producer

- Born: Russell P. Mills; December 16, 1962; Winston-Salem, North Carolina, U.S.
- Died: December 7, 2012 (aged 49); California, U.S.
- Occupations: Animator, director, producer
- Years active: 1980–2012
- Spouse: Andrea Mills
- Children: 1

Russell P. "Rusty" Mills (c. December 16, 1962 – December 7, 2012) was an American animator, director and producer. A Primetime Emmy winner, Mills was best known for his work with Warner Bros. Animation, including Animaniacs, Tiny Toon Adventures, and Pinky and the Brain. Mills was a five time Emmy winner, receiving one Primetime Emmy and four Daytime Emmy awards.

== Early life and career ==
Mills, a native of Winston-Salem, North Carolina, graduated from the University of North Carolina School of the Arts high school in 1980. He then completed his studies at California Institute of the Arts in Los Angeles after high school. He worked as a freelance animator following college before joining Warner Bros. Animation, where he worked for approximately ten years. His production credits with Warner Bros. included Tiny Toon Adventures and Animaniacs, which he worked on directly with Steven Spielberg one of the show's producers.

In 1996, Mills won a Primetime Emmy Award for his work on "A Pinky and the Brain Christmas," a Christmas episode of the animated television series, Pinky and the Brain, which aired in December 1995. Mills had directed that particular holiday episode of the series. During his career, Mills also won four Daytime Emmys and received eight Emmy nominations.

Mills' additional television animated credits included Garfield's Thanksgiving in 1989, Pinky, Elmyra & the Brain, Mickey Mouse Clubhouse, Batman: Mystery of the Batwoman, Pink Panther and Pals, and The Replacements. His last credited work was for the 2011 animated television special, A Very Pink Christmas, with the Pink Panther.

== Death ==
Mills died from colon cancer on December 7, 2012, at the age of 49. He is survived by his wife, Andrea; son, Evan; his mother, Janet Mills; and sister, Linda Hough.
