= John P. McCann =

American screenwriter

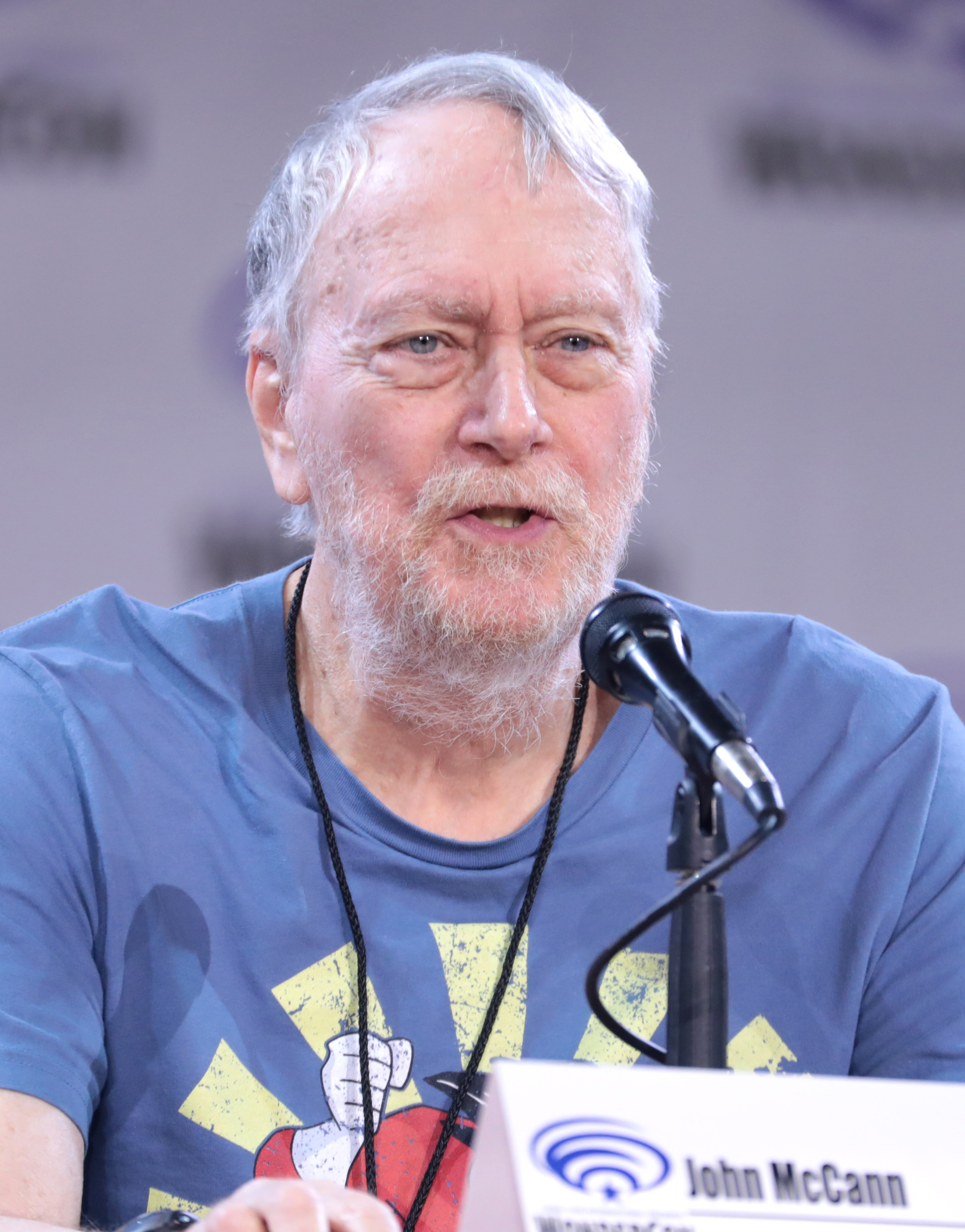
- McCann at the 2023 WonderCon
- Born: 1952 (age 73–74); Elmhurst, Illinois, United States
- Spouse: (1962–present)

John P. McCann is an American writer, actor and producer who has mostly focused on writing/producing animation and family-friendly scripts in the past. He is best known for his work on television cartoons, for which he has received numerous awards, but he has also produced live-action screenplays and television scripts. At present McCann is also working on short stories, and a novella. His fiction tends to be either darkly humorous or horror-related.

McCann was featured on a panel in July 2008 at San Diego Comic-Con with other veterans of Warner Bros. Animation, discussing Tiny Toon Adventures, Freakazoid!, and Batman. The panel included Jean MacCurdy, Sherri Stoner, Andrea Romano, Bruce Timm, Paul Dini, and Paul Rugg.

== Early life ==
Born in Elmhurst, Illinois in 1952, McCann grew up with his brother and his sister (Mary McCann, now a well-known radio DJ in her own right, based in Seattle) in the Chicago area—mostly in Skokie. McCann's first memory of making someone laugh is said to have been in a moment with his father. He did standup for some years in Illinois, where he met Arsenio Hall and Jay Leno.

== Acting and improv work ==
McCann moved to Los Angeles in 1979 to become a writer. Distracted by acting for a while, he worked at two separate comedy improv groups— The L.A. Connection and M.D. Sweeney's Acme Comedy Theater (formerly Two Roads Theater; Sweeney has sold the theater, and now runs the restaurant and club next door, said to have been an investment of Acme Alumnus Adam Carolla). Writing comedy skits enabled him to hone his abilities with dialogue and narrative, and to explore the way comic timing is affected by the needs of a story: he was no longer simply throwing out one-liners. He reached the summit of his acting career, he claims, as a double for Duncan Regehr (as Errol Flynn) in My Wicked, Wicked Ways: The Legend of Errol Flynn.

== Television writing ==
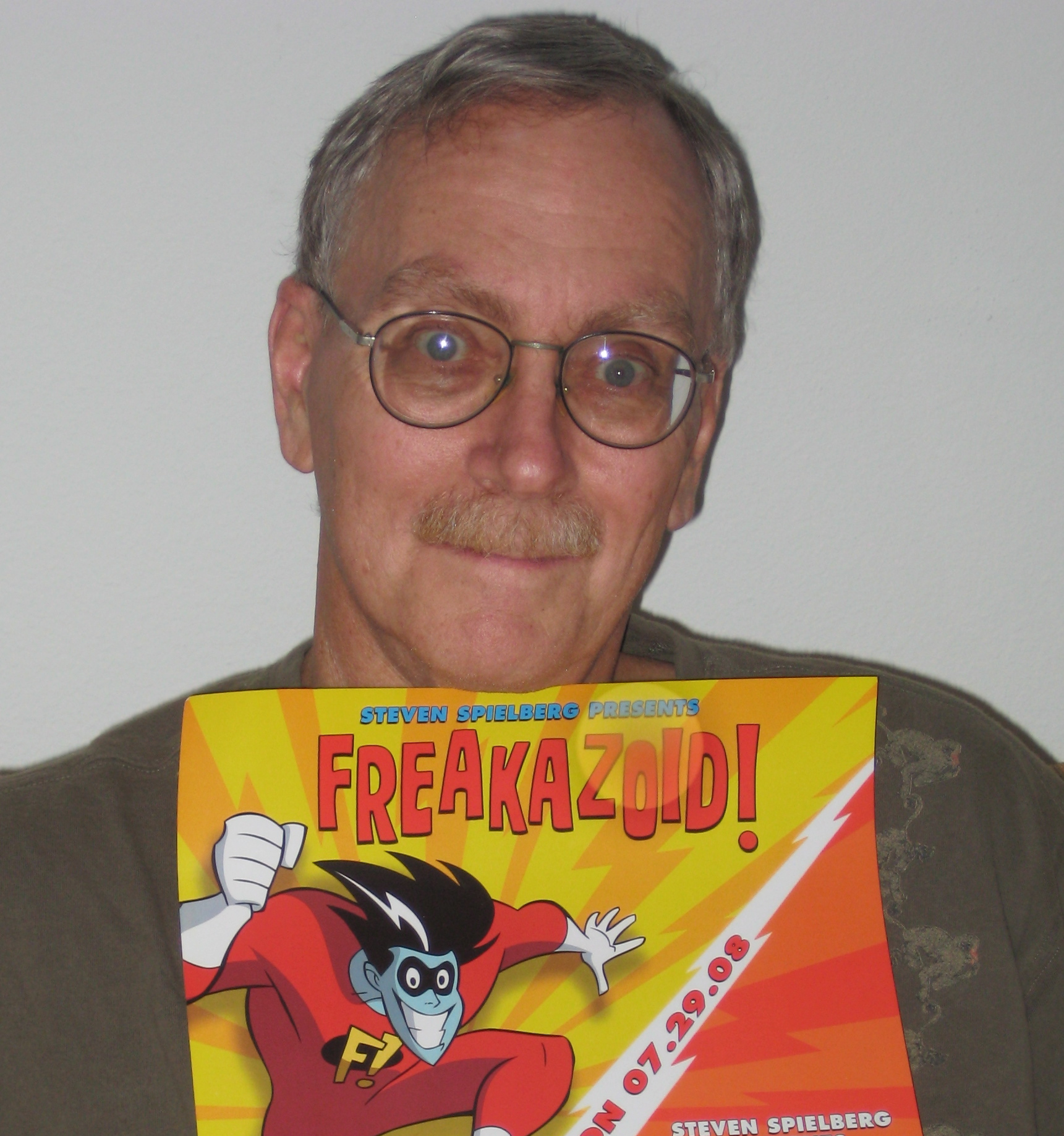
McCann in 2008

After Paul Rugg joined Acme Comedy Theater, Rugg and McCann were recruited by Tom Ruegger and Sherri Stoner of Warner Bro. Animation for freelance scripts. Ruegger then brought both Rugg and McCann aboard at Warner Bros., where they worked on Animaniacs and Freakazoid!. Along with being one of the primary creative forces behind Freakazoid!, McCann performed the voice for Douglas Douglas, Dexter Douglas' father, and Hero Boy. McCann later worked on Pinky, Elmyra & the Brain, a spinoff of Pinky and the Brain, which was ironic: the first script he'd written for Ruegger had been an experimental workup of a spinoff from Tiny Toons, using Elmyra Duff as the main protagonist.

McCann has received a Peabody Award and been nominated for seven Emmys—including one for songwriting—and has received three Emmy Awards: one for Animaniacs (as a writer), one for Freakazoid! (as a producer), and one for Pinky, Elmyra & the Brain (as a producer). At Warner Brothers, he worked not just on those titles, but also on Ozzy & Drix, Batman Beyond, and an adult animated streaming series based on the character Lobo. He also produced a couple of public service announcements for the U.S. State Department (in a joint project with Warner Brothers Animation) that featured Bugs Bunny and Daffy Duck, in which Cambodian people were warned about the dangers of picking up stray ordnance from the ground. He remarks that the project took him to Washington, DC once, and Cambodia twice. McCann also won a Prizm Award in 1999 for helping to raise public awareness about the dangers of drug addiction.

== Indie film production ==
In 1999, McCann wrote, produced and directed a short film in the improvisational style later popularized by Larry David's Curb Your Enthusiasm. A take-off on The Blair Witch Project, it was entitled The Glendale Ogre, and starred Marc Drotman, Scott Kreamer, and Kate Donahue. Scored by Julie and Steve Bernstein, it featured camera work by David Coons of Los Angeles' Artscans, himself most well known as the inspiration for the title of Po Bronson's The Nudist on the Late Shift.

Since leaving Warner Brothers Animation, McCann has worked on Jimmy Neutron, Dave the Barbarian, Tom Ruegger's Sushi Pack, and Animalia. He was also story editor for the animated European series Sherm, produced by BAF.

== Personal life ==
McCann lives with his wife in the hills east of Los Angeles, and claims to like "long walks through large corporate and government buildings." He has completed five marathons (including Honolulu, the ill-fated Chicago Marathon of 2007—and the Eugene, Oregon marathon, for which he "broke" four hours in May 2008). He acted as an assistant coach for the Leukemia and Lymphoma Society's Team in Training at the San Diego Rock 'n' Roll marathon in June 2008.

== Filmography ==
Year	Title	Role	Notes
1992	Tiny Toon Adventures	N/A	Writer (episode: "Take Elmyra Please")
1993–1997	Animaniacs	Stephen Wolf (voice)	Episode: "...And Justice for Slappy" Also writer (73 episodes)
1995	The Sylvester & Tweety Mysteries	N/A	Writer (5 episodes)
1995–1997	Freakazoid!	Douglas Douglas, Hero Boy (voice)	13 episodes Also producer and writer (24 episodes)
1995–1997	Pinky and the Brain	N/A	Writer (3 episodes)
1998–1999	Pinky, Elmyra & the Brain	N/A	Writer and producer (13 episodes)
2000	Batman Beyond	N/A	Writer (2 episodes)
2000	Lobo	N/A	Writer (15 episodes)
2003–2004	Ozzy & Drix	N/A	Writer (2 episodes)
2004	The Adventures of Jimmy Neutron, Boy Genius	N/A	Writer (episode: "The Science Fair Affair")
2004	Dave the Barbarian	N/A	Writer (2 episodes)
2006	Catscratch	N/A	Writer (episode: "Charge!")
2006	Biker Mice from Mars	N/A	Writer (3 episodes)
2007–2008	Animalia	N/A	Writer (3 episodes)
2010	Pink Panther and Pals	N/A	Writer (episode: "Shutter Bugged")
2010	Scooby-Doo! Mystery Incorporated	N/A	Writer (episode: "The Grasp of the Gnome")
2014	Kung Fu Panda: Legends of Awesomeness	N/A	Writer (episode: "The Hunger Game")
2014–2016	The 7D	N/A	Writer (2 episodes)
2015	The Mr. Peabody & Sherman Show	N/A	Writer (2 episodes)
2015	New Looney Tunes	N/A	Writer (2 episodes)
