= Pinky and the Brain =

American animated television series

- Also known as: Steven Spielberg Presents Pinky and the Brain
- Genre: Science fiction comedy
- Created by: Tom Ruegger
- Directed by: Andrea Romano (voice director)
- Voices of: Rob Paulsen; Maurice LaMarche
- Theme music composer: Richard Stone
- Opening theme: "Pinky and the Brain Theme" by Jess Harnell, Rob Paulsen, Dorian Harewood, & Jim Cummings
- Composers: Richard Stone; Steven Bernstein; Julie Bernstein; Gordon Goodwin; Carl Johnson
- Country of origin: United States
- No. of seasons: 4
- No. of episodes: 65 (96 segments) (list of episodes)

Production
- Executive producer: Steven Spielberg
- Producers: Liz Holzman; Charles M. Howell IV; Peter Hastings; Rusty Mills
- Running time: 22 minutes
- Production companies: Amblin Entertainment; Warner Bros. Television Animation

Original release
- Network: Kids' WB
- Release: September 9, 1995 – November 14, 1998

Related
- Pinky, Elmyra & the Brain (1998–1999); Tiny Toon Adventures (1990–1995); Animaniacs (1993–1998); Freakazoid! (1995–1997); Animaniacs (2020–2023); Tiny Toons Looniversity (2023–2025)

Pinky and the Brain is an American animated television series about two genetically enhanced laboratory mice, Pinky and The Brain or "Brain", who consistently try and take over the world.

The show was created by Tom Ruegger for the Kids' WB programming block of The WB, as a collaboration with Steven Spielberg and his production company Amblin Entertainment, and Warner Bros. Television Animation. This was the first animated television series to ever be presented in Dolby Surround.

The characters first appeared in 1993 as a recurring segment on the animated television series Animaniacs, which was also created by Ruegger. The beloved characters were Pinky who was voiced by Rob Paulsen and The Brain or "Brain" for short was voiced by Maurice LaMarche.

It was later spun off as a series due to its popularity, with 65 episodes produced and shown on the Kids' WB. The first episode of the series aired September 9, 1995 and ran until November 14, 1998. The first episode was a first and aired both on prime time WB scheduling and on the Kids' WB.

The characters later appeared in the short-lived sequel series Pinky, Elmyra & the Brain, and later returned to their roots as an Animaniacs segment in the 2020 revival of that series.

== Premise ==
Pinky and the Brain are genetically enhanced laboratory mice who reside in a cage in the Acme Labs research facility. Pinky is good-natured but feeble-minded, while the Brain is highly intelligent but arrogant, devious, and bitter. In the bulk of each episode, the Brain devises a new plan to take over the world with Pinky's assistance, which ultimately ends in failure, usually due to the impossibility of the Brain's plan, his own arrogance and overconfidence, an oversight on his part, Pinky's bumbling, circumstances beyond their control, or a combination thereof.

This formula has some exceptions. One centers on Snowball's plan to take over the world using Microsponge (a parody of Microsoft). Another episode features the Brain's single day where he tries to do anything but take over the world: in the end, a group of people votes that he should take over the world on the one day that he does not want to. In common with many other Animaniacs shorts, many episodes are in some way a parody of something else, usually a film or novel.

Many of the Pinky and the Brain episodes occur at Acme Labs, located in a large American city underneath a suspension bridge. Several episodes take place in historical times, with Pinky and Brain in the laboratory of some scientifically minded person, including Merlin, H. G. Wells, Ivan Pavlov, and Johannes Gutenberg. There is very little continuity between episodes, outside of the common fixtures of the two mice. Though some plans for world domination from early episodes are subsequently referred to in later seasons; for example, Brain's mechanical human suit that was first used in "Win Big" reappears when Brain faces his rival Snowball in "Snowball".

Both Pinky and the Brain, white lab mice kept as part of Acme Labs' experimentation, have undergone significant genetic alteration, per the show's title lyrics, "their genes have been spliced" which gives the two mice amplified intelligence over that of a typical mouse, the ability to talk to humans, and anthropomorphism. "Project B.R.A.I.N." suggests that the gene splicing occurred on September 9, 1995, which is coincident to the first full episode of Pinky and the Brain. The episode "Brainwashed" states that the gene splicing was done by Dr. Mordough, along with Snowball the hamster and Precious the cat, using the Acme Gene Splicer, a bagel warmer, and a hot dog steamer.

Although Pinky and the Brain plan to conquer the world, they do not show much animosity. In a Christmas special, Pinky even wrote a letter to Santa Claus saying that Brain had the world's best interests at heart.

== Episodes ==
Season	Episodes	Segments	Originally released	
Season	Episodes	Segments	First released	Last released
1	13	19	September 9, 1995	May 12, 1996
2	12	16	September 7, 1996	May 17, 1997
3	33	51	September 6, 1997	May 16, 1998
4	7	9	September 14, 1998	November 14, 1998

== Characters ==
=== Pinky ===
Pinky (voiced by Rob Paulsen) is a genetically modified mouse who shares the same cage as Brain at Acme Labs. Pinky is an extremely unstable and hyperactive mouse. He has several verbal tics, such as "Narf", "Zort", "Poit", and "Troz", the last of which he started saying after noticing it was "Zort" reflected backwards in a mirror. Pinky's appearance contrasts with Brain's – while Brain is short, has a crooked tail and pink sclerae, and speaks in a deeper, more eloquent manner, Pinky is tall, has a straight tail, blue sclerae, and a severe overbite, and speaks in a high-pitched voice with a Cockney British accent. Pinky's name was inadvertently given to him by Brain himself: when insulting the two scientists responsible for their gene splicing while talking to himself, Brain claimed the scientists had "less knowledge in both their heads than I do in my...pinky!" Pinky then responded with "Yes?", believing that Brain was referring to him.

Pinky is more open-minded, kinder, and generally happier than Brain. Troubles never ruin his day, possibly because he is too scatter-brained to notice them. He steadfastly helps Brain toward world domination, even though Brain usually berates, belittles and even abuses him. Pinky actually seems to enjoy this, often laughing after he is hit on the head. He is also Brain's moral compass and his only true friend. When Pinky sold his soul to the devil to give Brain the world in "A Pinky and the Brain Halloween", Brain saved him because he missed him and the world was not worth ruling without him. He is obsessed with trivia, spending a lot of time watching television in the lab and following popular culture fads. An entire episode (entitled "The Pinky P.O.V.") even shows a typical night of attempted world domination from his point of view, showing his thought processes and how he comes to the strange, seemingly nonsensical responses to Brain's famous question, "Pinky, are you pondering what I'm pondering?"

Pinky also has shown signs of intelligence, despite his supposed stupidity. He often points out flaws in the Brain's plans, which the Brain consistently ignores. The issues Pinky brings up can ironically lead to the downfall of the plan in any given night's plot. Sometimes, Pinky even finds non-rational solutions to problems. In "Welcome to the Jungle", Pinky was able to survive using his instincts and become a leader to Brain, who, despite his intelligence, could not survive in the wild on his own. And in "The Pink Candidate", when Pinky became president, he later began citing various constitutional amendments and legal problems that would bar Brain from his latest plot to take over the world. When Brain attempted to pressure him into helping, Pinky refused, claiming that the plan "goes against everything I've come to stand for."

=== The Brain ===
The Brain or "Brain" for short (voiced by Maurice LaMarche) looks and sounds like Orson Welles. In "What Ever Happened to Baby Brain", Brain actually crosses paths with Welles, who is working as a busboy in a Hollywood restaurant, and they find themselves inadvertently yelling in unison, "Things will be different when I take over the world!" In "Project B.R.A.I.N.", Brain's name is the backronym for the eponymous project: "Biological Recombinant Algorithmic Intelligence Nexus". His tail is angular and bent – he often uses it to pick the lock of the cage door – and his head is large and wide, housing his abnormally large brain. He is highly intelligent and develops complex plans for global domination using politics, cultural references, and his own inventions toward his goal. He seems coldly unemotional, speaking in a snarky deadpan voice. Nevertheless, Brain has a subtle sense of humor and has even fallen in love, with Trudie in the episode "The Third Mouse" and with Billie in "The World Can Wait". Due to his stature and megalomania, Brain has been compared to Don Quixote and has been called a pop culture depiction of Napoleon Bonaparte.

Many of the Brain's plots have the endgame of winning over the people's hearts and then having them make him their ruler. However, his motives are pure. He sees his inevitable rise to power as good for the world and not as mere megalomania. According to the creators, Brain wants to take over the world not for the sake of being a dictator, like his rival Snowball, but because he believes that he could do a much better job of it than the people currently in charge. Brain has even helped save the world by doing everything in his power to prevent Snowball's evil schemes, knowing that a world under Snowball's rule would be a worst-case scenario. In Animaniacs: Wakko's Wish, he said to Pinky "We're on our way to fame, fortune and a world that's a better place for all." In one episode, Brain finds himself hypnotized by a psychologist whom he had planned to manipulate for one of his schemes, who turns out to be none other than Sigmund Freud. There, Brain reveals that he originally lived with his parents in a tin can at the base of a tree in a large field. When he was young, ACME researchers captured Brain and took him from his home, and the last he saw of it was a picture of the world on the side of the can. Dr. Freud speculates that Brain's hunger to take over the world is misplaced, and that all he really wants is to go back home to his parents.

In the 2020 Animaniacs reboot, Brain gains a new rival in taking over the world in the form of his wife, Senator Julia Brain, after his attempts to mind-control her into becoming a puppet ruler for him led to her becoming insane.

=== Other recurring characters ===
- Snowball the hamster (voiced by Roddy McDowall) is Brain's former childhood friend-turned-rival who was also made intelligent by gene splicing and has a similar desire for world conquest (though his desire is far more malevolent than Brain's), which Pinky and Brain are sometimes forced to stop.
- Billie (voiced by Tress MacNeille) is a female white mouse and yet another result of gene splicing. She is smarter than Brain and also has the goal of world domination. Though Brain loves her, she fancies Pinky instead. In the episode "You'll Never Eat Food Pellets in This Town Again!", it is revealed that Brain is married to Billie (who in real life is named Sheila and hates playing Billie), who pretty much only agreed to marry him because he is famous, and eventually kicks him out and makes him live in his restaurant. It is later revealed that the events were just a dream.
- Pharfignewton (voiced by Frank Welker) is a white racing mare, with whom Pinky is in love. Though Brain constantly tells Pinky that he is a mouse and Pharfignewton is a horse, Pinky always chooses not to listen to him. Pharfignewton is a reference to a slogan from a Volkswagen ad from 1990: "Fahrvergnügen", which means something like "the enjoyment of driving".
- Larry (voiced by Billy West) is a white mouse who was created as a response to demands from Kids' WB executives to include additional characters on the show. His presence is sporadic, as the writers of the show believed that including an additional character would ruin the chemistry between Pinky and Brain, as they worked best as a comedy duo; thus a third character would be out of place and unnecessary to the plot. To further drive this point home, Larry's first appearance was marked by a modified version of the theme song with the words "and Larry!" shoehorned in between existing lyrics. He is a caricature of Larry Fine of The Three Stooges fame; therefore, the episode's title is "Pinky & the Brain... and Larry".

Other characters that have appeared on the series have included both of Brain's and Pinky's parents and the duo's "son", "Roman Numeral I" (Romy for short) another white mouse who was the result of a cloning mistake. Episodes also include recurring caricatures of celebrities, including both Bill and Hillary Clinton, David Letterman, Dick Clark, Drew Carey, Ryan Stiles, Kathy Kinney, J. D. Wilkes, Paul Gilmartin, Annabelle Gurwitch, Don Rickles, Michael Keaton, Eric and Donny from Too Something, "Macho Man" Randy Savage, The Allman Brothers Band, David Cross, Jack Black, Chris Shiflett, Jim Nabors as Gomer Pyle, and Christopher Walken, as was common on other Animaniacs cartoons.

== Creation and inspiration ==
Pinky and the Brain was inspired by the peculiar personalities of two producers of Tom Ruegger's earlier show Tiny Toon Adventures, Eddie Fitzgerald and Tom Minton, respectively. The two worked in the same office at Warner Bros. Animation and developed interesting personalities that the other staff had picked up on; Ruegger said that Minton seemed to be always scheming to take over the world, while Fitzgerald comedically agreed with him, injecting nonsense words like "Narf" and "Egad" around the office. The gag credit for the Tiny Toon Adventures episode "You Asked For It" credits Eddie Fitzgerald as "Guy Who Says 'Narf'". Series producer Peter Hastings described Eddie by saying, "He always greeted you like you were wearing a funny hat – and he liked it." During the development of Animaniacs, animator Bruce Timm drew caricatures of Minton and Fitzgerald, and Ruegger then added mouse ears and noses to the drawing, cementing the concept for Pinky and the Brain. The Fitzgerald/Minton connection to Pinky and the Brain is shown in the episode "The Pinky and the Brain Reunion Special". Two characters shown as writers for Pinky and the Brain cartoons within the short are caricatures of Fitzgerald and Minton.

While Ruegger initially based the Brain after Minton, the Welles connection came from Maurice LaMarche, a big fan of the actor/director, who had supplied the voice for Orson Welles in the 1994 movie Ed Wood. LaMarche stated that on coming in to audition for the character of the Brain, he saw the resemblance to Welles and went with that for the voice, and he was given the role on the spot. LaMarche describes Brain's voice as "65% Orson Welles, 35% Vincent Price". Brain's resemblance to Orson Welles was made explicit in an Animaniacs episode parodying Welles' infamous Frozen Peas ad outtake.

This cartoon was described by writer Peter Hastings as "a $250,000 inside joke": LaMarche used excerpts from it as sound check material before recording episodes, and Hastings took it to its logical conclusion. The writers developed the script in secret playing off these test lines and the Frozen Peas outtakes, and arranged to have recording on the same day as Sam Kinison's funeral, whom LaMarche was a close friend of. Prior to LaMarche's arrival, the other voice actors, including Paulsen, recognized the humor of the script after they started reading it. According to Paulsen, when LaMarche arrived, he had originally kept his professionalism after the funeral, but broke down in happiness as he recognized the script for what it was. The series also alluded to Welles with an episode in which Brain took on the mind-clouding powers of a radio character called "The Fog": a parody of The Shadow, a popular radio character for which Welles once provided the voice. Other Welles allusions include "Battle for the Planet", in which Brain, inspired by Welles' infamous War of the Worlds radio broadcast and the hysteria that it provoked, stages an alien invasion on television. A caricature of Orson Welles appears in a late episode of the series ("What Ever Happened to Baby Brain"), echoing a rant of the Brain's and introducing himself afterwards. One episode is a full parody of the film noir film from 1949,The Third Man.

Paulsen had already been selected to voice Pinky as he was already voicing Yakko Warner for Animaniacs. Paulsen, taking inspiration from British comedies such as Monty Python's Flying Circus, The Goon Show, and Peter Sellers, soon gave Pinky "a goofy whack job" of a British accent for the character.

The episode "Win Big" was the first Pinky and the Brain segment. It was developed for Animaniacs, written by Ruegger with a script by Peter Hastings, and directed by Rusty Mills. According to Ruegger, most of the elements that would become part of Pinky and the Brain can be found in Hastings's original script. It held many dialogue bits that became conventions of the entire series, including Brain's "Pinky, are you pondering what I'm pondering?", Pinky's "Oh...wait, no." in response to a plan, and Pinky's final question, "Why, Brain? What are we going to do tomorrow night?"

== Production ==
=== Producers ===
As with Animaniacs, Steven Spielberg was the executive producer during the entire run, Tom Ruegger was the senior producer, Jean MacCurdy was the executive in charge of production, and Andrea Romano was the voice director. Peter Hastings, Rusty Mills and Liz Holzman produced the series when it was spun off from Animaniacs, as well as the season it ran primetime on the WB. After the first season Hastings left the show and Mills took over as the supervising producer.

=== Writing ===
The original Pinky and the Brain shorts on Animaniacs were written primarily by Peter Hastings. Upon moving into its own series, the writing staff included Gordon Bressack, Charles M. Howell IV, Earl Kress, Wendell Morris, and Tom Sheppard. Comedian Alex Borstein was also a staff writer, years before her fame on MADTV and Family Guy. Classic Warner Bros. cartoon director Norm McCabe also wrote for the series.

=== Voice actors ===
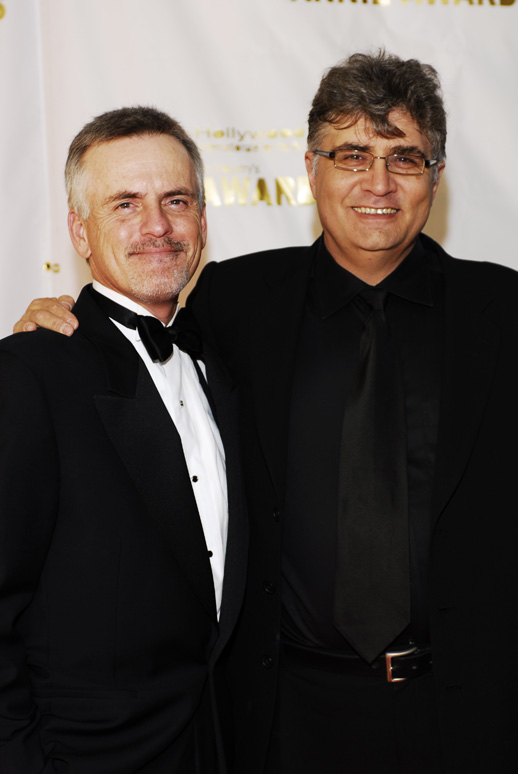
Rob Paulsen and Maurice LaMarche together at the 34th Annie Awards red carpet.

Pinky and the Brain were voiced by Rob Paulsen and Maurice LaMarche, respectively. The series also used the work of many of the same voice actors for Animaniacs, including Tress MacNeille, Jess Harnell, Frank Welker, Nancy Cartwright, Janet Waldo, and Jeff Bennett. Celebrities such as Roddy McDowall, Nora Dunn, Townsend Coleman, Ernest Borgnine, Eric Idle, Dick Clark, Ed McMahon, Steve Allen, Joyce Brothers, Gavin MacLeod, John Tesh, Michael McKean, Garry Marshall, Mark Hamill, James Belushi, and Steven Spielberg have all performed guest voice work for the series as well. Cree Summer has also voiced characters in Pinky and the Brain and reprised her role as Elmyra Duff during Pinky, Elmyra & the Brain.

=== Music ===
As with Animaniacs, Pinky and the Brain was scored by a team of five composers, led by Emmy Award-winning composer Richard Stone. This team included Steven Bernstein and Julie Bernstein, who also orchestrated and sometimes conducted the 40-piece orchestra. It was recorded at the Eastwood Scoring Stage, which was used by Carl Stalling for his work on Looney Tunes. The theme song for Pinky and the Brain was composed by Richard Stone with lyrics by Tom Ruegger.

Two versions of the opening sequence and theme, with slightly different lyrics, were used during the Animaniacs segments. In the first version, Yakko, Wakko, and Dot (voiced respectively by Paulsen, Harnell, and MacNeille) popped up in the lab and sang the theme while letting the two mice out of their cage. The second, later version had the singers off-camera as the Brain picked the lock on the cage door with a small needle to free himself and Pinky. On the Pinky and the Brain series, the theme gained an additional two verses and was sung by Harnell, Dorian Harewood, Jim Cummings, and Paulsen.

The score sometimes includes references to classical music. For example, in the episode where the Brain builds a new papier-mâché Earth, the theme from the 2nd and 4th movements of Dvořák's New World Symphony can be heard throughout the episode. The episode Napoleon Brainaparte makes frequent reference to the French anthem, La Marseillaise, while in the episode in which Pinky becomes the artist "Pinkasso", Mussorgsky's Pictures at an Exhibition can be heard.

=== Animation ===
Pinky and the Brain was key frame produced by Warner Bros. Animation under contract with Animated F/X systems in Sherman Oaks California. All individual episode scene backgrounds were created by Warner Bros. background artists, then digitally scanned and color corrected. All characters and scene props were ink and painted digitally then sent abroad for final animation and filming at the following offshore studios. Like Animaniacs, most of the original Pinky and the Brain segments used a variety of animation studios, including Tokyo Movie Shinsha, StarToons, Wang Film Productions, and AKOM. The bulk of the episodes created outside of Animaniacs (seasons 2 and beyond) were produced by Rough Draft Studios, Wang Film Productions and AKOM. The only episode that was animated by Tokyo Movie Shinsha on the spin-off series was A Pinky and the Brain Christmas.

=== Humor ===
Like Animaniacs, much of the humor in Pinky and the Brain was aimed at adult audiences. Parodies of pop culture icons were quite common on the series, more so during the original episodes developed for the WB prime time slot. In addition to previously mentioned political and actor caricatures, some episodes included complete parodies like those in Animaniacs. The episode "The Megalomaniacal Adventures of Brainie the Poo" parodies Disney's Winnie the Pooh franchise. "Cameos" include Jagger instead of Tigger and Algore instead of Eeyore. Algore is "full of hot air", and shown floating like a balloon. Other parodic elements include Christopher Walken in place of Christopher Robin and the "Brainie the Poo" book appears to have been written by "A. A. Meeting." The three-part episode "Brainwashed" included several allusions to the television show The Prisoner, though everyone in this version of the Village was identified by the hat that they wore, and not by a number.

Three songs resemble the musical segments in Animaniacs, matching existing music with new lyrics. Pinky sings "Cheese Roll Call" to John Philip Sousa's march "Semper Fidelis" praising his love for all cheeses from around the world. To the music of "Camptown Races", Brain lists the major parts of the human brain, with Pinky jumping in at the chorus to shout "Brainstem! Brainstem!". "A Meticulous Analysis of History" is set to "When I Was a Lad" from Gilbert and Sullivan's H.M.S. Pinafore, and sung by both Brain and Pinky, with Brain reciting the rise to power of such historical leaders as Napoleon and Cleopatra, while Pinky mentions how they all fell. In addition, "Brainwashed" featured a song called the Schmëerskåhøvên, a parody of the Macarena, which would brainwash people if it was done correctly. The song includes such odd lyrics as "Put your fingers in your ears, then stick them in your belly" and "Bop yourself on the head and cross your eyes."

Another common element in nearly every episode is the following exchange (often referred to by the acronym "AYPWIP"):

Brain: Pinky, are you pondering what I'm pondering?
Pinky: I think so, Brain, but...

Pinky's response ends with a non sequitur such as, "we're already naked", "isn't a cucumber that small called a gherkin?" or "if they called them Sad Meals, kids wouldn't buy them." Brain would then become furious, often bashing Pinky on the head. A few times in the series Pinky and Brain indeed pondered the same thing, though in one of these Pinky dismissed his idea as being too stupid. Just one time the answer was "Yes I am!", when Pinky's intelligence is elevated to match Brain's. In another episode, it turns out that what Pinky was pondering was that he and Brain never ponder the same thing, which turned out to be part of what Brain was pondering as well. In a short episode ("Pinky's P.O.V.") the spectator sees everything Pinky sees (including his imaginations) and hears his thoughts. His brain seems to censor a large portion of Brain's dialogue, leaving Pinky to wander into random internal tangents until Brain asks the question. Pinky then responds with whatever was on his mind at the end of the tangent.

== Reception ==
Variety writer Tony Scott was critical of the show after its premier saying "...the plot, the in jokes and the overall concept need retooling."

=== Popularity ===
Pinky and the Brain were popular on Animaniacs, and the popularity continued into their own series. It attracted many of the same fans as Animaniacs, and Internet outreach attracted more. Maurice LaMarche and Rob Paulsen appeared on voice actor tours around the Warner Bros. Studio Stores.

In an interview on the third DVD volume, LaMarche and Paulsen noted that Roy Langbord (vice-president of Showtime), Al Franken, and Barenaked Ladies are fans of the shows. Naughty Dog co-founder Jason Rubin was also fond of the series; the character of the Brain served as an influence in the creation of Doctor Neo Cortex, the main antagonist of the Crash Bandicoot video game series.

=== Nominations and awards ===
Pinky and the Brain won several Emmy and Annie Awards. In 1996, the series won an Emmy Award for Outstanding Animated Program for the episode A Pinky and the Brain Christmas. Paulsen won the Annie Award for Outstanding Individual Achievement for "Voice Acting by a Male Performer in an Animated Television Program" in 1996 and 1997, while LaMarche won the same in 1998. Paulsen also won an Emmy Award for Outstanding Performer in an Animated Program for his role as Pinky subsequently in 1999. The series itself won the 1999 Daytime Emmy for "Outstanding Special Class Animated Program".

The episode "Inherit the Wheeze", in which Brain was subject to the effects of smoking by a tobacco company, won a PRISM Award for its anti-smoking message.

== History ==
=== Animaniacs ===
Pinky and the Brain first appeared as a recurring segment on the animated series Animaniacs, another series produced by Steven Spielberg. On September 14, 1993, Pinky and the Brain premiered on television in the episode "Win Big", which aired on the FOX network.

The first season was scheduled in a prime time slot from September 10, 1995, through July 21, 1996, on Kids' WB!, with episodes also being repeated within the Saturday morning cartoon block. It had been envisioned for the series to be the WB network's answer to The Simpsons, at that point in its 7th season, which was running on the FOX network. The series tended to have more jokes and humor aimed at adults rather than children. Due to poor ratings following the first season, primarily due to running against 60 Minutes, subsequent seasons were moved to Saturday mornings as part of the Kids' WB! programming block.

Even though they had their own series, they still had several shorts in Animaniacs after they got the series, still appeared in the series' intro and often made cameo appearances.

=== On Pinky, Elmyra & the Brain ===
In 1998, the overall structure within the WB Network changed, including the placement of Jamie Kellner as head of the Kids WB! programming. Along with this came pressure on the writers of the series to back off on the idea of world domination and to include more characters on the series. The episode "Pinky and the Brain...and Larry" was a response to this pressure, attempting to show the studio heads that the series was fine as it was, that Pinky and the Brain worked together as a comedy duo – each balancing each other out with their flaws and personalities – and that a third character (or any extra characters at all) would be out of place and thus unnecessary to the plot. At this point, Peter Hastings, a key writer for the series, decided to quit, with his last script being "You'll Never Eat Food Pellets in This Town Again!", directly addressing the issue of network executives trying to retool shows that otherwise already work. Following the production of the episode, the network backed off from forcing new characters into the show.

With increased pressure from the WB network, the series eventually was retooled on September 19, 1998, into Pinky, Elmyra & the Brain, in which Pinky and the Brain were owned by Tiny Toon Adventures character Elmyra Duff; the unusual change in format was even sarcastically noted in the altered title song, with lyrics such as "It's what the network wants, why bother to complain?". The decision was not well received by the existing crew. For one, according to Paulsen, Spielberg had stated that the Tiny Toons and the Animaniacs/Pinky and the Brain universes were to be kept separate. Furthermore, the chemistry between the characters were altered; by introducing Elmyra (who tended to be even more dense than Pinky was), it shifted Pinky to become the useless "Larry" of this series, as described by Paulsen. This series lasted for 13 episodes, six of which were shown unedited and seven of which were split up into segments and aired as a part of The Cat&Birdy Warneroonie PinkyBrainy Big Cartoonie Show.

=== On the Animaniacs revival ===
Pinky and the Brain, with voice work by Paulsen and LaMarche, were featured as primary recurring characters along with the Warner siblings as part of the 2020 revival of Animaniacs produced by Amblin and Warner Bros. for broadcast on Hulu. Two seasons of 13 episodes were ordered, with the first season first broadcast on November 20, 2020, and the second first broadcast on November 5, 2021. A third and final season was ordered, releasing on February 17, 2023. A series of four promotional shorts, starring Pinky and the Brain teaching a MasterClass on world domination, was released on March 17.

== Merchandise ==
Pinky and the Brain, along with Animaniacs, aired coincident with the formation of the Warner Bros. Studio Store chain across the United States, and, as a result, numerous T-shirts, coffee mugs, stuffed animals, animation cels, and original artwork from the show were available through these outlets. Other merchandise included comic books, computer games, and videotapes. When Warner Brothers acquired the Hanna-Barbera animation properties in 1998, there was a significant decrease with such merchandise through the store. By the time the series was cancelled, very little merchandise was available.

=== VHS releases ===
Four VHS collections of Pinky and the Brain episodes were released in 1996 and 1997, each with approximately two to four episodes that included shorts from Animaniacs. These collections are now out of print.

Title	Release date	Content
Pinky and the Brain: A Pinky and the Brain Christmas	August 13, 1996	"A Pinky and the Brain Christmas"; "That Smarts"
Pinky and the Brain: World Domination Tour	August 13, 1996	"Pavlov's Mice"; "Brain Meets Brawn"; "Where Rodents Dare"; "Tokyo Grows"
Pinky and the Brain: Cosmic Attractions	November 4, 1997	"Fly"; "Around the World in 80 Narfs"
Pinky and the Brain: Mice of the Jungle	November 4, 1997	"Snowball"; "Welcome to the Jungle"; "Brainstem"

=== DVD releases ===
Warner Home Video has released all 65 episodes on DVD in Region 1 over three volumes, as well as a "Complete Series" bundle that was released on September 26, 2023.

DVD name	Ep. #	Release date	Additional information
Pinky and the Brain Volume 1	22	July 25, 2006	This four-disc box set includes the first 22 episodes from the series. Contains "Pinky and the Brain: Are You Pondering What I'm Pondering?" – a featurette with Tom Ruegger, Peter Hastings, Rob Paulsen, Maurice LaMarche, and Andrea Romano as they discuss why they had so much fun working on the series.
Pinky and the Brain Volume 2	21	December 5, 2006	This four-disc box set contains the next 21 episodes from the series. (Note: Volume 2 is billed as having 22 episodes. There are actually 21 episodes within the set. Within the case's labels, however, Episode 36: "Mice Don't Dance"/"Brain Drained" is split into two listings for a rounded 22-numbered set. The two cartoons are still part of the same episode within the disc itself.) Contains "The Return of World Dominating Extras" – a featurette with Mark Hamill and Wayne Knight as they answer a casting call to do the voices of Pinky and the Brain and get coached by none other than Maurice LaMarche and Rob Paulsen.
Pinky and the Brain Volume 3	22	June 19, 2007	This four-disc box set contains the last 22 episodes of the series. Contains "It's All About the Fans" – a featurette with Rob Paulsen (the voice of Pinky) and Maurice LaMarche (the voice of the Brain) paying tribute to their fans.
Pinky and the Brain: The Complete Series	65	September 26, 2023	This twelve-disc box set contains all 65 episodes of the show's entire run, along with the three bonus features from the show's prior volumes.

=== Comic books ===
Pinky and the Brain were also regulars in the Animaniacs comic book series published by DC Comics. From July 1996 to November 1998, they also starred in their own comic book series (also published by DC Comics), which ran first for one Christmas Special issue and then 27 regular issues, all drawn by artist Walter Carzon, before its cancellation. Following the cancellation of the Pinky and the Brain series, the two mice later starred in stories that took up half of the later issues of the Animaniacs comic book series which, starting at issue #43, was re-titled Animaniacs featuring Pinky and the Brain and ran for another 16 issues before the aforementioned series' cancellation.

=== Video games ===
There are two video games based on Pinky and the Brain. The first, a PC game called Pinky and the Brain: World Conquest, was produced by SouthPeak Games and distributed by Warner Bros. The second was Pinky and the Brain: The Master Plan for the Game Boy Advance. The game was produced by Warthog and distributed by SWING! Entertainment in 2002. A third game, titled simply Pinky and the Brain, was announced for the Sega Saturn in 1996 and was planned to be published by Konami, but was later cancelled. The characters have also appeared in several of the Animaniacs video games, such as Animaniacs: The Great Edgar Hunt.

=== Music ===
While Pinky and the Brain does not feature as many songs as Animaniacs, some of the music from the show can be found across the three Animaniacs CDs. An expanded version of the Animaniacs segment "Bubba Bo Bob Brain" presented in a radio drama or audiobook fashion was released as a read-along book and CD in 1997 by Rhino Entertainment.

== See also ==
- Jamie Kellner
