= Freakazoid! =

American animated TV comedy series (1995-1997)

- Also known as: Steven Spielberg Presents Freakazoid!
- Genre: Action; Superhero; Slapstick comedy
- Created by: Bruce Timm; Paul Dini
- Developed by: Tom Ruegger
- Directed by: Andrea Romano (voice director)
- Voices of: Paul Rugg; David Kaufman; Edward Asner; Craig Ferguson; Jonathan Harris; Tracy Rowe; David Warner
- Narrated by: Joe Leahy
- Theme music composer: Richard Stone
- Composers: Richard Stone; Steven Bernstein; Julie Bernstein; Gordon Goodwin; Tim Kelly; Carl Johnson
- Country of origin: United States
- Original language: English
- No. of seasons: 2
- No. of episodes: 24 (49 segments) (list of episodes)

Production
- Executive producer: Steven Spielberg
- Producers: Mitch Schauer (Season 1); Paul Rugg (Season 2); Rich Arons (Season 2); John P. McCann (Season 2)
- Running time: 22 minutes
- Production companies: Amblin Entertainment; Warner Bros. Television Animation

Original release
- Network: Kids' WB
- Release: September 9, 1995 – February 14, 1997
- Network: Cartoon Network
- Release: May 31 – June 1, 1997

Freakazoid! is an American superhero comedy animated television series created by Bruce Timm and Paul Dini and developed by Tom Ruegger for the Kids' WB programming block of The WB. The series chronicles the adventures of the title character, Freakazoid, a crazy teenage superhero who fights crime in Washington, D.C. It also features mini-episodes about the adventures of other superheroes. The series was produced by Warner Bros. Television Animation and Amblin Entertainment, being the third animated series produced through the collaboration of Steven Spielberg and Warner Bros. Animation after Tiny Toon Adventures and Animaniacs.

Bruce Timm, best known as a producer of the DC Animated Universe, originally intended for the series to be a straightforward superhero action-adventure cartoon with comic overtones, but executive producer Steven Spielberg requested it to be a flat-out comedy. The show is similar to fellow Ruegger-led programs such as Animaniacs, having a unique style of humor that includes slapstick, fourth wall breaking, parody, surreal humour, and pop culture references.

The series was among the five cartoons that helped launch The WB's children's programming block, Kids' WB on September 9, 1995, alongside Animaniacs (acquired after its cancellation by Fox), The Sylvester & Tweety Mysteries, Pinky and the Brain, and Earthworm Jim. The series lasted for two seasons across 24 episodes, with the final episode airing on June 1, 1997. Although the series originally struggled in the ratings, reruns on Cartoon Network and a fan following elevated it to become a cult hit. Warner Bros. considered renewing the series for a third season, but deemed it to be too expensive. The show also ranked #53 on IGN's Top 100 Animated Series list.

== Background ==
The show's title character is the superhero alter ego of geeky 16/17-year-old Dexter Douglas, a student of Harry Connick Jr. High School. His name alludes to the alliterative names that superheroes commonly have. Dexter gains his abilities from a computer bug activated by a secret key sequence accidentally typed by Dexter's cat, Mr. Chubbikins. Freakazoid has enhanced strength, endurance, speed, and agility, as well as access to all of the Internet's knowledge. He cannot fly, but often runs around with his arms extended and making whooshing sounds with his mouth, pretending he is. His base is the Freakalair, a parody of the Batcave built by his mute butler Ingmar, which contains a "Hall of Nifty Things to Know" and a mad scientist lab. His greatest weakness, as he explains to the head of Apex Microchips, Armando Guitierrez, is graphite bars charged with negative ions. He also expresses a great aversion to "poo gas".

Freakazoid also has several other abilities; he once developed telekinesis powered by anger, and once crossed the globe to yell at a Tibetan monk. He also has the ability to assume the form of electricity and cover long distances instantaneously, although he often simply sticks his arms forward and runs while pretending to fly.

Dexter can change into and out of Freakazoid at will with the respective phrases "Freak out!" and "Freak in!". Freakazoid spends his inactive time in an area of Dexter's brain called the Freakazone, where he reflects and watches Rat Patrol reruns.

While the show is set around Washington, D.C., the locale often varies with its humor, taking Freakazoid to locations around the world.

== Episodes ==
Season	Segments	Episodes	Originally released	
Season	Segments	Episodes	First released	Last released
1	36	13	September 9, 1995	February 17, 1996
2	13	11	September 7, 1996	June 1, 1997

== Characters ==
- Freakazoid (voiced by Paul Rugg) is the protagonist of the series. He is the alter ego of geeky 16-year-old computer ace Dexter Douglas (voiced by David Kaufman), a student of Harry Connick Jr. High School who became Freakazoid after the Pinnacle Chip inside his computer was activated. To transform and detransform, Dexter says "Freak out!" and "Freak in!" respectively. Dexter and Freakazoid are sometimes considered to be separate identities, and other times are considered the same person.

=== The Douglas family ===
- Debbie Douglas (voiced by Tress MacNeille) is Dexter's mother. She is unaware he is Freakazoid and is generally blithe and clueless.
- Douglas Douglas (voiced by John P. McCann) is Dexter's father. He is incompetent but still attempts to keep his family in line.
- Duncan Douglas (voiced by Googy Gress) is Dexter's older brother. He is a stereotypical jock who often bullies Dexter, but is frequently tormented by Freakazoid.
- Mr. Chubbikins (vocal effects provided by Frank Welker) is the Douglas family's cat who caused Dexter's transformation into Freakazoid after accidentally typing in the key sequence that activated the Pinnacle Chip's flaw.

=== Allies ===
- Sgt. Mike Cosgrove (voiced by Ed Asner) is a gruff yet kind-hearted police sergeant who is friends with Freakazoid and several other characters. He has the ability to get people to stop what they are doing by pointing at something and saying "Cut it out". He can also find Freakazoid no matter where he is and often interrupts him to ask him to visit various entertainments, which Freakazoid always agrees to. During this visit, Cosgrove reveals important information about the plot of the episode, resulting in Freakazoid leaving to foil the villain's scheme. Additionally, Freakazoid entrusted Cosgrove with his secret identity and is upset when he accidentally reveals it to Steff and Professor Jones.
- Roddy MacStew (voiced by Craig Ferguson) is Freakazoid's mentor and expositionist. He is an ill-tempered Scotsman who once worked for Guitierrez and was the first to discover the Pinnacle Chip's flaw. Using the Chip, MacStew can travel to and from cyberspace.
- Steff (voiced by Tracy Rowe) is Freakazoid's kind yet cynical and sarcastic girlfriend, whose real name is Stephanie. She discovers Freakazoid's secret identity after Cosgrove accidentally reveals it in "Mission: Freakazoid".
- Hans (voiced by Larry Cedar) is a mysterious European agent who takes Freakazoid to Professor Heiney's lab.
- Professor Heiney (voiced by Ed Gilbert) is a scientist with a lab in the mountains, where he researches and kills monsters.
- Ingmar is Freakazoid's mute butler, who built and maintains the Freakalair. In the episode "Mission: Freakazoid", Ingmar quits to become a rodeo clown and is replaced with Professor Jones.
- Professor Jones (voiced by Jonathan Harris) is a snooty and cowardly man, who replaces his old friend Ingmar as Freakazoid's butler. Jones does not get along well with Cosgrove and gets little respect from others. He is a parody of Dr. Zachary Smith, Harris' character from Lost in Space, acknowledged by several characters asking him if he was in a TV show with a robot.
- Joe Leahy (voiced by himself) is the show's vocal narrator and announcer.
- Freakazette is a female counterpart to Freakazoid who only appears in the segment "Freakazoid and Friends".
- Foamy the Freakadog (vocal effects provided by Frank Welker) is a vicious, rabid dog who Freakazoid frees from a dogcatcher's van and briefly adopts as his sidekick.
- Handman (voiced by Paul Rugg) is Freakazoid's brief "right hand man", who is a painted face on his right hand. He falls in love with and marries Handgirl, a painted face on Freakazoid's left hand.
- Expendable Lad (voiced by Paul Dini) is Freakazoid's sidekick in "And Fanboy Is His Name". He is hospitalized after Milk Man bruises his clavicle and is released from Freakazoid's service.

=== Enemies ===
Freakazoid! features several campy villains in his rogues gallery:

- The Lobe (voiced by David Warner) is Freakazoid's archenemy, an evil genius with a giant brain for a head. Despite his high intellect, he has very low self-esteem, once even having a scheme foiled after Freakazoid insults his plan to turn the world into clowns, despite being impressed by it after he leaves.
  - Medulla (voiced by Jeff Bennett in "Dexter's Date", Maurice LaMarche in "Normadeus") and Oblongata (voiced by Larry Cedar) are the Lobe's henchmen.
- Cobra Queen (voiced by Tress MacNeille), real name Audrey Manatee, is a former shoplifter who was transformed into a humanoid with reptile-like features after stealing an experimental expired cosmetic. In later episodes, she and Cave Guy are shown to be dating.
  - The Giant Snakes (vocal effects provided by Frank Welker) are three giant-size snakes that are the pets of Cobra Queen and assist her in her criminal activity.
- Cave Guy (voiced by Jeff Bennett), real name Royce Mumphry, is a thuggish blue-skinned caveman with upper-class diction and taste. He speaks in a stereotypical WASP tone based on Jim Backus. Later episodes have Cave Guy in a relationship with Cobra Queen.
- Longhorn (voiced by Maurice LaMarche), real name Jubal "Bull" Nixon, is a former employee of the Johnny Cat cat litter company who turned to crime and later transformed himself into a humanoid Texas Longhorn via plastic surgery to avoid detection. He is additionally an aspiring musician and owns a high-tech truck nicknamed "Bessie Mae".
  - Turk (voiced by Matt Landers) is Longhorn's henchman.
- Armando Guitierrez (voiced by Ricardo Montalbán) is the head of Apex Microchips, who designed the faulty Pinnacle Chip responsible for Freakazoid's creation. In the first-season finale "The Wrath of Guitierrez", Guitierrez uses the Chip to gain powers similar to Freakazoid, but is defeated and lost in the Internet. In the second season, Guitierrez escapes, becomes a fugitive, and begins wearing a hooded robe to cover the right side of his face, which has become cybernetic.
  - Jocko (voiced by Paul Rugg) is Guitierrez's inarticulate henchman.
- Candle Jack (voiced by Jeff Bennett) is a supernatural villain with a burlap sack covering his head who abducts anyone who says his name aloud.
- Waylon Jeepers (voiced by Jeff Bennett) is a man from Venice Beach who created the Medusa Watch, which can turn people and pigeons into stone. He is obsessed with the supernatural and is well acquainted with several monsters, including Count Dracula, the Wolf Man, and the Loch Ness Monster. His voice is an impersonation of Vincent Price.
- Invisibo (voiced by Corey Burton) is an ancient Egyptian pharaoh originally known as Ahmon Kor-Unch, who wields a staff that enables him to become invisible. He was previously sealed inside a sarcophagus, which was later unearthed and placed in a museum. Kor-Unch escapes after Dexter and Duncan accidentally break the sarcophagus while visiting the museum and assumes the alias Invisibo.
- Booger Beast (voiced by Frank Welker) is a slimy monster who attacks Steff in the cold opening of episode 9.
- The Nerdator (voiced by Aron Kincaid) is a man who plans to kidnap all of the nerds in the world and absorb their knowledge to become a "Super-Nerd". However, Freakazoid convinces him of the downsides of being a nerd, after which he discontinues his plot and instead begins kidnapping "good-looking, but vapid airheads". His design is a parody of the Predator.
- Arms Akimbo (voiced by John Schuck) is a spoiled model turned extortionist who, after years of posing, was left with his arms frozen in a pose with his hands on his hips. He sells "oops insurance", a form of protection racketeering which mainly consists of him breaking valuable things. His voice is an impersonation of Edward G. Robinson.
- The Milk Man is a milk-themed villain with a milk bottle-shaped cannon attached to a backpack. Freakazoid and Expendable Lad fight Milk Man in "And Fanboy Is His Name". He injures Expendable Lad's clavicle, resulting in him retiring.
- Deadpan (voiced by Bebe Neuwirth) is a plain-looking, shapeshifting supervillainess with a monotonous voice. She appears in the cold opening of "The Wrath of Guitierrez", where she plans to pose as Freakazoid, but is immediately exposed when Freakazoid walks by.
- Mary Beth (voiced by Tress MacNeille) is an ancient, fire-breathing monster with a distorted voice who disguises herself as a human and operates as an esteemed cosmetics executive. She maintains her youth by absorbing the life force of superheroes and plans to do so to Freakazoid, but he prevents her from doing so, causing her to age into dust.
- Janos Ivnovels (voiced by Jim Cummings) is the dictator of Vuka Nova and its Minister of State Security. He captures Freakazoid's family on false charges of espionage before he frees them and leaves Ivnovels to be tortured by the Mime from Animaniacs.
  - Colonel Anton Mohans (voiced by Larry Cedar) is a vicious thug and Ivnovels' servant.
- Vorn the Unspeakable (voiced by Richard Moll) is a Cthulhu-like demon and ally of Waylon Jeepers.
- Dr. Mystico (voiced by Tim Curry) is a mad scientist with aspirations of world domination. He was kicked out of university for his mad science and set up a laboratory on a remote island to continue his experiments.
  - Sparkles is Dr. Mystico's pet cat and closest companion.
  - The Orangu-Men (vocal effects provided by Jim Cummings) are orangutan-human hybrids created by Dr. Mystico from the orangutans that were indigenous to his remote island and human test subjects. Three of them are named Fatima, Akbar, and Ringo.
- Eye-of-Newt is a one-eyed creature who resembles Newt Gingrich. He appears in the "Freakazoid and Friends" sketch and made a cameo in "The Huntsman" theme song.

Several villains were created by Bruce Tim during the original development of the show, including Kid Carrion, Major Danger, and, Bombshell. While they are not properly introduced in the series, they each make cameo appearances in "The Lobe" among the villains who watch the Lobe attempt to lobotomize Freakazoid.

=== Other ===
- Mo-Ron/Bo-Ron (voiced by Stan Freberg) is an obese and dimwitted alien from the planet Barone's, a reference to the restaurant of the same name. His name was changed to Bo-Ron to appease network censors' concerns that use of the word moron would be offensive. In "Freak-a-Panel", Mo-Ron joins Lord Bravery, the Huntsman, and Fanboy in confronting Freakazoid on why they were dropped from the show.
- Fanboy (voiced by Stephen Furst) is an obese, socially awkward fanboy and would-be sidekick to Freakazoid. In "Freak-a-Panel", Fanboy joins Lord Bravery, the Huntsman, and Mo-Ron in confronting Freakazoid on why they were dropped from the show.
- Hero Boy (voiced by John P. McCann) is the title character of Freakazoid's favorite TV show, which is a parody of Astro Boy. He has no powers except for flight and rarely succeeds in battle.
- Lonnie Tallbutt (voiced by Mitch Schauer in human form, vocal effects provided by Jim Cummings in werewolf form) is a werewolf who Freakazoid cures by sending him into the Internet. His name is a reference to actor Lon Chaney Jr. and Lawrence Talbot, Chaney's character in The Wolf Man.

The series features multiple caricatures of real life celebrities, including Bill Clinton (voiced by Frank Welker), Hillary Clinton (voiced by Tress MacNeille), Barbra Streisand (voiced by MacNeille) Paul Harvey (voiced by Paul Rugg), Henry Kissinger (voiced by Rugg), and series executive producer Steven Spielberg (voiced by Welker). A few caricatures are voiced by their real life counterparts, including Jack Valenti, Mark Hamill, Leonard Maltin, and Norm Abram. Characters from other Spielberg cartoons, including the stars of Animaniacs and Pinky and the Brain, also make frequent cameo appearances.

Certain characters do not contribute to the plots of the episodes, appearing only in the background as part of a running gag. For example, a short, hunchbacked man named Emmitt Nervend appears in the background of the title sequence and nearly every episode. Each episode's credits sequence gives him a different job title or counts the number of times he appears in the episode. Another recurring gag involves a fictional actress named Weena Mercator, who is credited as playing "The Hopping Woman" whenever an episode features a parody credits sequence, despite no such character appearing in the episode.

== Mini-segments ==
Freakazoid! also features several mini-segments, primarily in the first season. Each of these have their own theme songs and title cards, and only occasionally appear in the main show. These segments include:

- Lord Bravery – Nigel Skunkthorpe (voiced by Jeff Bennett impersonating John Cleese) is a superhero from the United Kingdom who resembles a Roman soldier. He does not do much in the way of superheroics, as he is snooty, cynical and unwilling to do unpleasant tasks. Likewise, he gets little respect and recognition from the public and his wife and mother-in-law (voiced by Tress MacNeille and Mark Slaughter respectively), with whom he lives. Lord Bravery later appears in the episode "Freak-a-Panel", where he, the Huntsman, Fanboy, and Mo-Ron confront Freakazoid about why they were dropped from the show.
- The Huntsman – Marty Feeb (voiced by Jeff Bennett impersonating Charlton Heston) is a Robin Hood-like hero who lives in the woods and gained his powers from corn that an elf gave him for saving his life. When summoned by the Horn of Urgency blown on top of the city's police department, the Huntsman takes action and races to the city to fight crime. To his dismay in his episodes, he rarely finds crime to fight. In "Freak-a-Panel", the Huntsman joins Lord Bravery, Fanboy, and Mo-Ron on confronting Freakazoid on why they were dropped from the show.
- The Lawn Gnomes – Baffeardin (voiced by Clive Revill), Huska (voiced by Carl Ballantine), Honna (voiced by Rose Marie), and Quist (voiced by Larry Gelman) are a group of trickster gnomes who come to life at night in a parody of Gargoyles. The wizard Rathgar (voiced by Maurice LaMarche) placed a curse on the gnomes that transforms them into inanimate garden gnomes during the day and will only be lifted if they reform and do good for the people.
- Toby Danger – A parody of Jonny Quest that was originally written as a standalone short for Animaniacs, but slotted into Freakazoid! to fill time. It features the adventures of Toby Danger (voiced by Scott Menville), his scientist father Vernon Danger (voiced by Don Messick, who was the original voice of Dr. Benton Quest), his adoptive sister Sandra Danger (voiced by Mary Scheer), and Vernon's bodyguard Dash O'Pepper (voiced by Granville Van Dusen, who voiced Race Bannon in the 1986 version of Jonny Quest).
- Fatman and Boy Blubber – The misadventures of two overweight superheroes (voiced by Marc Drotman and Paul Rugg, respectively), in a parody of Batman. Their only segment involves them coming to the aid of Louis (voiced by Scott McAfee), an overweight boy who loves sweet buns and is being tormented by bullies.

== Production ==
=== Voicing ===
The voice actors of the show Freakazoid! included various actors from other television series and films. Tress MacNeille, Maurice LaMarche, Jeff Bennett, and Frank Welker, who all provided voices in the series Animaniacs, were on Freakazoid!. Actors Ed Asner, Ricardo Montalbán, Larry Cedar, Jonathan Harris, and Stephen Furst also provided voices for the series. Also, writers John P. McCann and Paul Rugg (who played Freakazoid) added voices themselves.

Casting for the show had been difficult for the Freakazoid! staff, as no lead character had been found even after extensive auditions. Eventually, when writer Paul Rugg was brought to demonstrate the voice in a recording session, he ended up filling the role, as he said: "I went in there and did it. Then they played it for Steven Spielberg and he said 'Yep! Fine, sure, great,' and then I panicked ... and I had to do it." Rugg played the role of Freakazoid through the entire series run.

=== Animation ===
The animation was outsourced to Animal-ya, Studio Junio, and Tama Production in Japan, Seoul Movie, Dong Yang Animation, and Koko Enterprises Ltd. in South Korea.

=== Music ===
The music for Freakazoid! was written by Richard Stone, Steve Bernstein, Julie Bernstein, Gordon Goodwin, and Tim Kelly. Stone won a Daytime Emmy with lyricist (and senior producer) Tom Ruegger for the main title song in 1996. Julie Bernstein was nominated for a Daytime Emmy for Outstanding Original Song in 1998 for the song "Invisibo" from the episode "Freak-a-Panel".

== Controversy with Mike Allred's Madman ==
The show and its lead character was criticized for plagiarizing the superhero comic book Madman by Mike Allred, asserting that the title characters share several personality traits, they both have blue skin and wear similar costumes featuring a chest emblem including an exclamation mark. During the short run of the show, Allred remained relatively silent on the subject, but in 2003, he responded to a question about the show on the message board of his official website:

[Show creator] Bruce Timm was kind enough to tell me that Madman was a direct inspiration for the show, with comics open and referred to when developing the show.

Stupidly, I was flattered; happy to inspire anything. But when the show came out, with no acknowledgement or credit or any kind of compensation, I slowly became annoyed as everyone and their uncle confronted me with "there's this cartoon that's ripping off Madman" and "you oughta sue".

I simply wrote a friendly letter to [show producer] Steven Spielberg telling him his production was a direct lift of my creation, I had no intention of creating ripples, I just wanted him to know that I knew. No one replied, which is fine. And to be honest, Madman is an amalgam of a half a dozen other influences. So who am I to complain (the exclamation mark on the chest still kinda irks me a little though. A little too close for comfort).

== Humor ==
The humor in Freakazoid! relied heavily on slapstick, parody, and pop culture references. Due to the series being metafiction, much of the series was self-aware humor (i.e. breaking the fourth wall); for instance, after the first appearance of the Freakmobile, the show goes immediately into an impromptu commercial for a toy version, and later in the episode, Freakazoid addresses an audience, congratulating the staff on how hard they have worked to make the show toyetic. A running gag involves a repeated credit for "Weena Mercator as the Hopping Woman", though no such character appears in any episode. The show also incorporated humor aimed at the WB Network, such as questioning the meaning of the initials "WB".

Freakazoid! made frequent use of stock footage, including a peaceful scene of a field of flowers ("Relax-O-Vision"), numerous people screaming and traditionally dressed Bavarians dancing and slapping each other ("Candle Jack"), and a man being shot in the belly with a cannonball and a man wrestling a bear ("The Chip").

Cameo appearances were also a major element of the show's humor. At various times, Freakazoid! hosted appearances by characters from other Warner Bros. shows such as Pinky and the Brain, Animaniacs and an insinuated appearance by Bruce Timm's animated version of Batman. Portrayals of many celebrities (including producer Steven Spielberg) and guest appearances by such figures as Jack Valenti, Leonard Maltin and Mark Hamill as themselves were also commonplace. Norm Abram had an entire episode, "Normadeus", built around him. One original character, a bizarre-looking man named Emmitt Nervend, plays no role whatsoever other than enabling a Where's Waldo-esque hunt for his cameos (complete with the number of his appearances announced in the closing credits).

One of the show's longest cameo appearances was in the episode "The Freakazoid", where Freakazoid, Wakko from Animaniacs, and the Brain from Pinky and the Brain argue over which of their shows is Steven Spielberg's favorite, with Freakazoid arguing that his show was the favorite (Tiny Toon Adventures was not represented in the discussion as it was on Nickelodeon at the time, while the others were on Kids' WB). When the trio confront Spielberg over the issue, he admits to having no idea who they are.

== History ==
=== Creation ===
I mean, it probably would not have worked as a straight super-hero show. It was really neither fish nor fowl. It was such a weird idea that it probably needed to be a comedy more than an adventure show.

— Bruce Timm, Modern Masters Volume 3: Bruce Timm

Freakazoid! was created by animators Bruce Timm, who had previously produced Batman: The Animated Series, and his writing partner Paul Dini, who was also a story editor for Tiny Toon Adventures. Timm was called upon by Steven Spielberg, who Timm said "liked" Timm's Batman series, to help create a new superhero show. After a meeting with Spielberg, Timm said that Spielberg had "really liked" the idea for the series, after which Timm and Dini created the character Freakazoid, an edgy superhero with a manic personality. Timm came up with the name for the character naturally, as he recalled, "The name 'Freakazoid' just kind of jumped out of me, I don't even know where from. I said 'Oh, yeah, 'Freakazoid', that might be an interesting name.'" Dini and Timm have also discussed their desire to create a TV show about the Creeper, another comic character.

Timm originally created Freakazoid! to be a serious "adventure show" with some comedic undertones. However, his initial idea for the series did not come to be, as he stated:

I don't mind that it's not on my résumé. [Laughs] I bailed on it really early. It started out as an adventure show, but it ended up turning into more and more of a comedy show; every time we'd have a meeting with Steven, the concept would kinda [sic] change, and it kept leaning more and more towards zany comedy. It really started out almost like Spider-Man, on that level of, like, a teenage superhero. And it reached a point where it became a comedy with the Tiny Toon Adventures/Animaniacs kind of humor. (...) I don't have anything against that; I just don't have a flair for it, so I bailed—I just hung out here while my staff had to do the show. [Laughs]

After Timm left the series, Tom Ruegger, who developed the other Spielberg series Tiny Toon Adventures and Animaniacs, was brought in to re-develop the series Timm had created "from the ground up". Ruegger's version of the series used some of Timm's designs and concepts, but Timm said that the series was "radically altered" to become the comedy series that was more to Spielberg's liking.

Ruegger then began writing stories for the series, and came up with a pile of very short segments. Spielberg liked what Ruegger had written, but wanted longer stories for the series as well. Ruegger then asked writers John McCann and Paul Rugg to come onto the series to write longer, more elaborate stories for the series and, according to Rugg, "(...) figure out what this [Freakazoid!] was going to be, and the answer was like, 'We didn't know', and still don't".

=== Premiere, cancellation, and syndication ===
Freakazoid! premiered on Kids' WB's Saturday lineup on September 9, 1995. During its run, Freakazoid! came across problems of appealing to its target demographic, young children. Tom Ruegger said that Freakazoid! had done poorly in ratings because the audience that the series gathered was older than the target audience. Also, Freakazoid ran into timeslot problems. Writer John McCann said that the time slot of the series changed frequently: "They put it at eight o' clock in the morning, 3:30 in the afternoon, they shifted it all around; we couldn't even find it, and we wrote the thing". The series ran on Kids' WB until February 14, 1997, when it was canceled due to poor ratings, airing only one complete season and part of a second season. Rugg said the series' demise was the result of a combination of people not understanding the series, time slot changes, appealing to the wrong demographics, and that "(...) there aren't a lot of Nielsen boxes in federal prisons. Had there been, I'm telling you, we'd still be on the air today". However, the show was later picked up by Cartoon Network and was rebroadcast from April 5, 1997, until March 29, 2003. The series had a total number of 24 episodes. In 2006, Freakazoid! was one of the shows scheduled to be broadcast on the AOL broadband channel, In2TV. The show is currently available to stream for free on Tubi.

=== Reception ===
The series won a Daytime Emmy Award for Outstanding Special Class Animated Program.

Bruce Timm said that the series still has a cult following of fans who ask him questions about the series whenever they meet him.

According to Timm, the character's co-creator, he actually has a preference for the second season:

BRUCE: I actually liked the second season better than the first season. The second season was less Animaniacs. It was more Monty Python, it was much more surreal. It was less hip, topical in-jokes, and---

MM: And more eating cotton candy in the Himalayas.

BRUCE: And the weird Astro Boy parody and stuff like that. I thought that stuff was much funnier and much more unique. The first season, to me, was just Animaniacs with a super-hero in it.

== Merchandise ==
=== Print ===
Freakazoid never had his own comic book, but he did make a special guest crossover in issue #35 of the Animaniacs comic book published by DC Comics.

=== Home video ===
Warner Home Video has released the entire series on DVD in Region 1.

DVD name	Ep #	Release date	Bonus features
Season 1	13(+1)	July 29, 2008	Audio commentary on three "key episodes", promos from the series launch, and a featurette tracking its evolution from an action series to a comedy series.
Season 2	11	April 29, 2009	Featurettes on the making of the last episode, "Favorite Moments" from the series, and an original demo tape for the song "Bonjour, Lobey" from series composer Richard Stone.

== Legacy ==
The sixth season episode of Teen Titans Go!, "Huggbees", aired on November 14, 2020, and features Freakazoid helping the Teen Titans defeat the Lobe and Brain when they join forces. It was mentioned by Freakazoid that Steven Spielberg would have to approve the crossover which led to Robin sending a message to Steven who approves of the crossover. According to Rugg, the production team for the show had sent him a script involving Freakazoid in December 2019 which he approved. The episode has Rugg, David Warner, Ed Asner, and Joe Leahy reprising their respective roles.
