= Peter Hastings (director) =

American screenwriter and film director (born 1960)

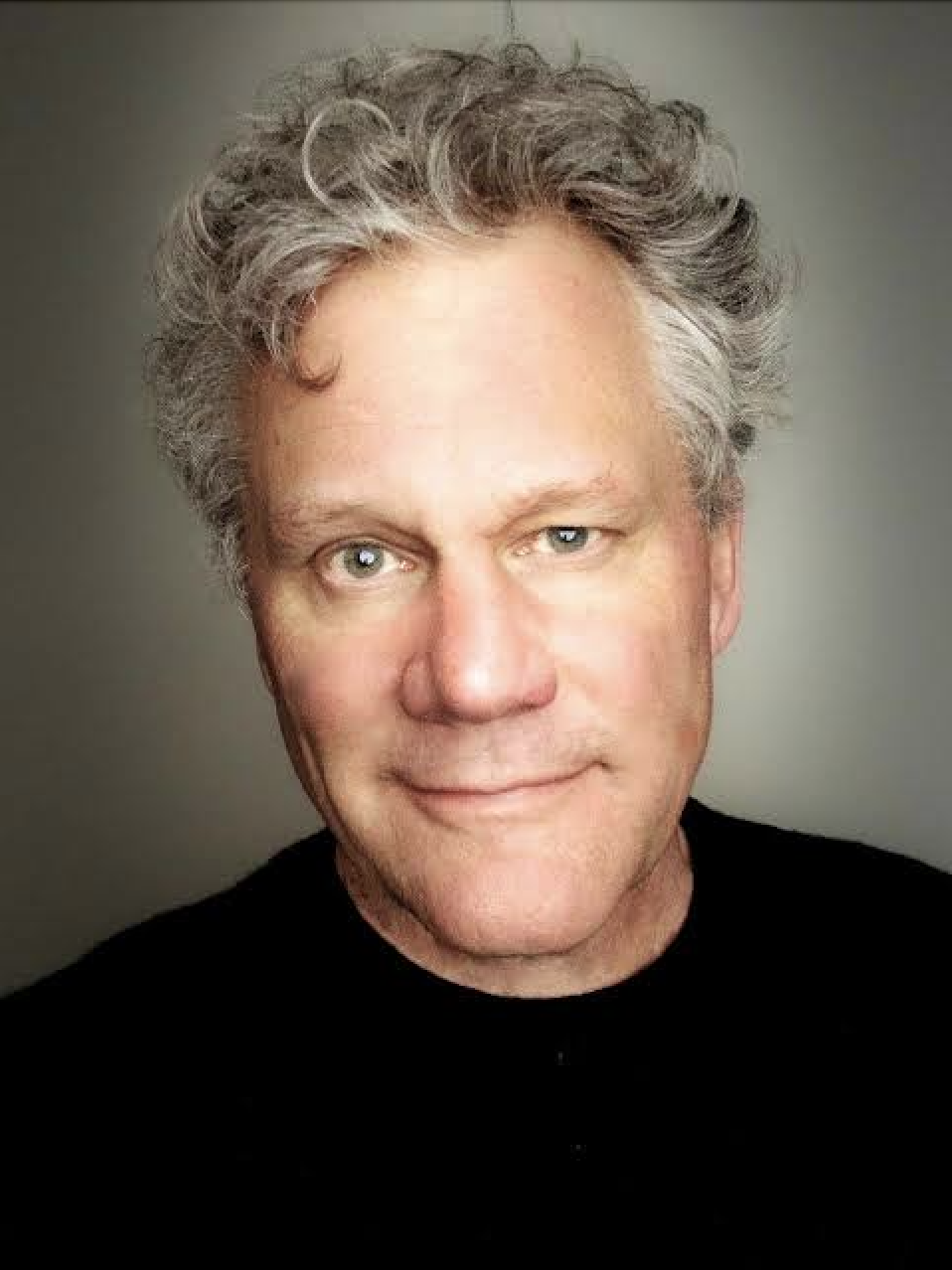
- Born: January 9, 1960 (age 66); Haverford, Pennsylvania, U.S.
- Education: Berklee College of Music
- Known for: Director; writer; producer
- Notable work: Dog Man; The Country Bears; Pinky and the Brain

Peter Livingston Hastings (born January 9, 1960) is an American animation director, screenwriter, and voice actor. He is known for The Epic Tales of Captain Underpants, Kung Fu Panda: Legends of Awesomeness, Animaniacs, Teenage Mutant Ninja Turtles, Pinky and the Brain, and ABC's One Saturday Morning block. He has won six Emmy awards and a Peabody award. He also directed the musical film The Country Bears (2002) and wrote and directed the animated film Dog Man (2025).

== Career ==
Hastings worked for Warner Bros. Animation in the mid-1990s, writing for Animaniacs and Pinky and the Brain. He left Warner Bros. in 1998, amid a dispute with the company over the direction of Pinky and the Brain (in particular the company's ultimately successful attempt to add a third main character to the series, which Hastings and most of the rest of the crew opposed).

On July 26, 2002, Hastings made his directorial debut with The Country Bears, based on the Disney theme park attraction Country Bear Jamboree.

On December 12, 2017, Netflix and DreamWorks Animation Television announced that there would be an animated series to follow up the feature film adaptation of the book series, Captain Underpants: The First Epic Movie, entitled The Epic Tales of Captain Underpants. It premiered on the streaming service on July 13, 2018, and was executive-produced by Hastings.

DreamWorks Animation announced a film adaptation of Dog Man in December 2020, with Hastings directing and writing after his experience with Dav Pilkey's works from The Epic Tales of Captain Underpants (2018–20). Hastings also provided the vocal effects for the titular character.
