= List of Saturday Night Live commercial parodies =

On the American late-night live television sketch comedy and variety show Saturday Night Live (SNL), a commercial advertisement parody is commonly shown after the host's opening monologue. Many of the parodies were produced by James Signorelli. The industries, products, and ad formats targeted by the parodies have been wide-ranging, including fast food, beer, feminine hygiene products, toys, clothes, medications (both prescription and over-the-counter), financial institutions, automobiles, electronics, appliances, public-service announcements, infomercials, and movie & TV shows (including SNL itself).

Many of SNL's ad parodies have been featured in prime-time clip shows over the years, including an April 1991 special hosted by Kevin Nealon and Victoria Jackson, as well as an early 1999 follow-up hosted by Will Ferrell that features his attempts to audition for a feminine hygiene commercial. In late 2005 and in March 2009, the special was modernized, featuring commercials created since the airing of the original special.

== # ==
- 10 Beatles Classics You Kind of Know the Words To – "The Kind of Know the Words To Singers" energetically sing the few lyrics they know from the legendary band's song catalog, and mumble the others they don't (e.g. "muttermuttermuttermutter IN TUCSON, ARIZONA! muttermuttermuttermutter" from "Get Back"), in this compilation album promo from April 1989.
- 16 and Pregnant Spinoffs – A November 2010 ad finds MTV cashing in with spinoffs inspired by 16 and Pregnant and Teen Mom (complete with an altered logo to "MTV: Maternity Television"). The parody promotes My Super Sweet 16 and Pregnant; America's Best Pregnant Dance Crew; Wild 'n Out with a special guest (a baby); an all-baby-cribs edition of MTV Cribs; and I'm Snooki and Pregnant (Snooki would reveal her pregnancy and engagement in March 2012).
- 1-800-Flowers – Kristen Wiig promotes the floral retailer as a way to show love for her mother (Kate McKinnon) "even when Mom is at her most annoying".
- 2026 Winter Olympics – Airing one week before the Games began in Milan & Cortina, this ad featured some of the Team USA athletes excited to "go for the gold" in their chosen sports... and Gertie Burper (Jane Wickline), who dislikes being good at luge ("I just go straight down like everyone, but I scream the whole time").
- 5-hour Empathy – "For when you just don't get it," the manufacturers of 5-hour Energy invent a liquid supplement that provides, according to Kenan Thompson's voiceover, "5 full hours of complete, intimate understanding of years of systemic oppression and ever-present racism." Although having an initial desire to do so, ad subject Beck Bennett is hesitant to try it, pantomiming chugging it down ("The cap is still on," notes Thompson); insisting that he is not racist ("I voted for Biden; what more do you want?!"); and offering it to wife Heidi Gardner, who also declines ("I don't need that, 'cause I'm a woman, so… it's the same").
- 24-Hour Energy for Dating Actresses – This parody postulates that having an actress for a girlfriend, and dealing with their quirks, can leave a man exhausted and debilitated. However, this once-daily supplement gives men the energy they need to handle their paramours' constant rehearsing, mastering of foreign accents, emotional swings over callbacks, etc. Also promoted is a female formula, "24-Hour Energy for Dating Comedians."
- 2020 Part 2: 2024 – Democratic-leaning voters are terrified over Joe Biden possibly running for re-election as U.S. President in 2024, and who would run for the party's nomination if he declined, in this October 2022 horror movie trailer "from the producers of Smile and the twisted minds of Morning Joe."

== A ==
- ABBA Christmas – This infomercial spoof promotes a never-released album of holiday songs from "the Fleetwood Mac of cold weather" (Bowen Yang, episode host Kate McKinnon, and McKinnon's fellow SNL alums Maya Rudolph and Kristen Wiig), all set to the tunes of their well-known classics (e.g. "Gifts for Me, Gifts for You").
- Abilify for Candidates – "Because not everyone can be President," this version of the atypical antipsychotic is specially formulated for candidates in the 2016 presidential election, among them Rick Santorum (Taran Killam) and Mike Huckabee (Bobby Moynihan).
- Academy of Better Careers – Spokesman Wendell Craig pitches a program for people to find jobs as stand-by operators.
- Action Cats – A parody of action-figure toys featuring plastic armor and weapons for live cats.
- Ad Council – This Season 11 ad features actor Rex Robbins walking through various ad environments (from an electrical plant to country settings to Wall Street to, lastly, a suburban neighborhood), but the scenes fast-cut from one to the next before Robbins can mention the product, only showing him drinking from a plan-branded cola in the final scene. The closing tagline: "Wasting your time in various ways… for no good reason."
- Adobe – A car that's cheap (sticker price: $179) but also unsafe (it's made entirely of clay) yet "combines German engineering and Mexican know-how!"
- Adopt Belushi for Christmas – On the last episode before Christmas 1976, host Candice Bergen encourages families to write in and invite John Belushi into their home for the holidays (since, unlike the rest of the cast and crew, he has no place else to go).
- Aerotoilet – An Aerobed-like inflatable toilet that can be used anywhere and is perfect for guests at large parties. A cut-for-time ad from Season 47.
- Airbnb – Natalie (Chloe Fineman) enjoys offering her home to guests through the lodging service... although she laments sharing it with European guest Ooli (also Fineman), whose one-night stay has been extended due to the COVID-19 pandemic quarantine, resulting in Natalie being subjected to Ooli's discourteous manners (e.g. washing dishes with a garden hose, doing yoga topless in the front yard).
- Alaska Airlines – After a door plug on one of its Boeing 737 MAX 9 planes broke and caused decompression post-takeoff, the airline states that they're taking precautions (e.g. tightening bolts, bringing Sully Sullenberger out of retirement) and reassuring passengers that they'll have a great story to tell after the plane lands (complete with a $50 commemorative photo). The tagline: "Still better than Spirit."
- Aliens 4: Mad About You Aliens – Episode host (and Mad About You star/creator) Paul Reiser plays himself in this trailer for a new Aliens movie that he just so happens to have run, consequently fusing it with the kind of humor common on Mad About You ("In space, no one can hear you argue!").
- The Al Pacino Accused Murderer Biopic Series – Fresh off playing Phil Spector in a biopic for the network, and three years after he played Dr. Jack Kevorkian in another film, HBO calls again on Al Pacino (Bill Hader) to play several other famous figures accused of murder, including Ted Kaczynski, Amanda Knox, the Menendez brothers, the captain of the Costa Concordia, Oscar Pistorius, and Conrad Murray (Michael Jackson's personal physician).
- Al Sharpton's Casa De Sushi – Sharpton (as himself) opens a Japanese restaurant in Secaucus... even though Sharpton hates the food and only runs the restaurant because, "Well, presidential campaigns don't finance themselves, people."
- Almost Pizza – Bill Hader, Kristen Wiig and Nasim Pedrad appear in this spoof of DiGiorno pizza and, to a greater extent, the questionable contents of frozen pizza in general. It may look and smell like pizza, but it's not quite pizza, as proven by its molecular instability (it gets hotter when removed from the oven, shatters like glass, then regroups and crawls on the floor). Coy Wiig refuses to tell husband Hader and daughter Pedrad exactly what it is, though ("I mean, it looks like pizza!" "Yeah, that was their intention."), and when it scampers away, the entire family — even Wiig — freaks out over its behavior ("Mother[expletive]!"). At the end, it's also stated to be a Pfizer product.
- AM Ale – An alcoholic beverage for the morning, because "you can't wait 'til afternoon".
- Amazin' Lazer – A consumer grade laser gun used for cleaning up yard waste or (as onscreen superimpositions discourage) dangerous and potentially criminal acts.
- The Amazing Alexander – This 1986 ad promotes a Broadway theatre performance by a popular stage hypnotist (portrayed in performance still shots by Jon Lovitz). Audience members interviewed in the ad give the show unanimous praise—the same praise, in fact, delivered in a hypnotic trance ("I loved it. It was much better than CATS. I'm going to see it again and again.").
- Amazon – Husbands and kids can buy typical Mother's Day gifts (e.g. bed and bath items, a new washing machine) on the website... but moms use it to buy vibrating massagers (which one daughter mistakes for a microphone) or the best-selling novel Fifty Shades of Grey (in hard-copy or, so the husband doesn't have to know she's reading it, on Kindle).
- Amazon Echo Silver – Designed in partnership with AARP, this smart speaker device for elderly users speaks very loudly, responds to anything remotely resembling "Alexa," and mutters "Uh-huh" during long, rambling stories.
- Amazon Go – "No lines. No Checkout. (No, seriously.)" That's the tagline for the convenience store chain where, with just a scan of their Amazon app, customers can grab what they want and leave... though, despite the reassurance, Black customers are clearly skittish to do so (e.g. Punkie Johnson insists on paying, episode host Zoë Kravitz asks white boyfriend Andrew Dismukes grab a bottle of kombucha for her).
- AMC Theatres – The movie theater chain's celebration of the moviegoing experience has been parodied in two ads:
  - An ad that closed out Season 46 spoofs AMC's teaming with Vin Diesel to promote his upcoming F9; this parody finds Diesel (Beck Bennett) celebrating the little minutiae ("The tickets… the sticky floors… that hand-dryer in the bathroom that's louder than a choo-choo train") that makes going to "the mooo-vies" so great.
  - Season 48's premiere parodied Nicole Kidman's "We Make Movies Better" ad. It begins as a nearly shot-for-shot remake of Kidman's original ad until Kidman (Chloe Fineman) becomes a mystical, almost demonic entity as the patrons seated around her stand, cult-like, to salute the power of the theater ("Heartbreak feels good in a place like this!").
- American Cancer Society – This PSA from Season 6 has spokeswoman Gail Matthius promising to honestly and openly discuss breast cancer and perform a self-exam, a promise broken when she discusses the exam in euphemisms and her chest is covered by a censor bar.
- American Dope Growers Union – Laraine Newman and a chorus of marijuana growers who "support ourselves by growing marijuana in American soil" encourage people to "look for the union label" wherever they buy dope ("It says we deal for the U.S. of A."). A 1977 parody of the ILGWU's famous ad jingle.
- American Express – This 2015 parody of the credit card's celebrity-driven ad campaign features episode host Chris Hemsworth recalling how people said he was too tall, too blonde, and too muscular to make it in show business. But, he concludes, "if a jacked Australian with a perfect face can make it, anyone can."
- American Girls – This Season 48 film trailer gives the American Girl dolls adventures that are as cheery as those the Barbie line experience in their own upcoming motion picture, but are still rooted in historically accurate backstories (e.g. one doll comes from the Victorian Era, another is a runaway slave).
- American Girl XL – A new line of life-size dolls for women who wish their American Girl figures could mature out of childhood with them... and for men who desire another type of doll.
- American Taser – A series of people demonstrate the latest models of tasers by shocking each other. It begins with a pitchman (Chris Parnell), followed by a police officer (Jason Sudeikis), a second pitchman (Darrell Hammond), a sexual predator (Seth Meyers), a feminist businesswoman (Amy Poehler), an angry wife (Rachel Dratch), the angry wife's husband (Will Forte), a black man (Kenan Thompson), a racist nightwatchman (Bill Hader), a militant black man (Finesse Mitchell), a Star Trek geek (Andy Samberg), and ends with the manufacturer's president (episode host Jason Lee) who shocks himself.
- America's Turning Gay – A parody of uplifting ad campaigns for 7 Up ("America's Turning 7-Up") and Dr. Pepper ("Be a Pepper") where small-town residents celebrate their sudden realization of their homosexuality.
- America's Worst Moments – Spokesman Chris Parnell pitches a commemorative plate collection featuring America's most shocking and embarrassing moments in politics and pop culture.
- Amy Fisher – One month after Fisher was sentenced to prison for shooting the wife of her paramour, Joey Buttafuoco, and just days after ABC, CBS, and NBC (in a 6-day span) offered their own TV movie dramatizations on Fisher's life and crime, SNL made the saga of "the Long Island Lolita" a recurring theme in its first episode of 1993, including the following ad parodies:
  - Aaron Spelling's Amy Fisher 10516 – Fox goes the 90210 route and casts Tori Spelling (Melanie Hutsell) in the role of Amy opposite episode host Danny DeVito as Joey
  - Amy Fisher: One Messed-Up Bitch – A gritty all-Black telling of the tale, airing on BET and starring Jackée Harry (Ellen Cleghorne) in the role of Amy
  - Unbelievable New Breakthroughs: The Amy Fisher Story – An infomercial promoting a book written by Amy's victim, Mary Jo Buttafuoco (returning SNL alum Jan Hooks), that lets her offer her side of the story while receiving hair replacement treatment from Ron Popiel (DeVito)
- ...and More – Tina-Tina Chenuse (Jenny Slate) promotes her stores that stock personalized novelties. The skits share 3 elements: Tina-Tina introducing herself, "Hi-lo, I'm Tina-Tina Chenuse"; the store names ending with "and More" (e.g. "Car Horns and More"); and Tina-Tina exclaiming "Oh, my God" somewhere in the sketch.
- And So This Is Hanukkah – A promo for a celebrity-packed Hanukkah special featuring entertainers who know very little about the holiday.
- Angora Bouquet – A sedative-laced facial cleanser that "washes your brain as well as your face".
- Angry Dog – Dog food with "synthetic testosterone and seven psychoactive drugs" (and a picture of Michael Vick on the package) that turns any dog ferocious.
- Annuale – Medicine that keeps women on a constant stream of hormones, allowing them only one period per year. But when each period happens, the user can become violent (Tina Fey wields an ax in the office), aggressive (Amy Poehler kicks her husband in the groin), hungry (Casey Wilson shovels an entire birthday cake down her mouth at a child's party), and sexually frustrated (Kristen Wiig French kisses her dog a la Asia Argento in Go Go Tales).
- The Apocalypse – "The people who brought you Valentine's Day and New Year's Eve" apply the same themes of those films (romantic comedy, holiday setting, all-star ensemble cast) to the world's end. This trailer's tagline: "It's love… at last sight."
- Aron's List – an online service that's similar to Angie's List but charges a lower fee, thanks to its roster of plumbers, carpenters, etc. who are on the "American Registry of Non-Violent Sex-Offenders" (what the site's "Aron" acronym stands for).
- Asian American Doll – A Barbie parody promotes "the doll that's Asian American" and, as noted in Cecily Strong's voiceover, has been designed to be as bland as possible so that it's as inoffensive as possible ("As the box says, 'Just take her or leave her'"). This includes not assigning her a name up front (kids get to do that); a play house that's barren; and accessories including a dog and a chef's hat... until one girl realizes that those are plays on the stereotype of dog meat consumption in South Korea.
- Asociacion Mexicana del Riñon – In this Spanish-language ad Phil Hartman explains that the Mexican Kidney Association will give you money for your kidneys and how they'll do so; a kidney-less Jose (episode host Paul Shaffer) remarks the experience was worth it.
- Ass Angel Perfume Jeans – Women can both look and smell great in these jeans that mask "secret little lady scents" with aromas of lavender, rose, and industrial chemicals ("do not wear these jeans if you have kidney or liver problems… consult your doctor before purchasing"). Set in a 1980s music video style, this Season 46 ad features episode host Adele, returning SNL alum Maya Rudolph, and feather-haired rocker Beck Bennett (♪♫"She's got the ass of an angel/I wanna smell it some more"♪♫).
- Ass Don't Smell – Personal hygiene spray intended to keep one's buttocks smelling fresh and clean; a parody of feminine hygiene deodorant sprays.
- Autoscent – Just as air fresheners deodorize the home, this product does the same for an automobile's internal combustion system; just spray it into the carburetor every 800 miles, and your car's exhaust will smell like lilacs or pine forests.
- Autumn Fizz – "The Carbonated Douche" that "brings out the natural fragrance of femininity, with the effervescence of uncola."
- Autumn's Eve Pumpkin Spice Douche – from the makers of Summer's Eve comes a feminine hygiene product that has the bold, spicy scent of fall.
- Aw Nuts! Mom's a Ghost! – A promo for a new Disney Channel show centered on a family with a peculiar mother (episode host Kristen Wiig): After taking a lover on a business trip to South Korea, only to have him drown her to keep their affair a secret, she returns as a "Korean water ghost" to raise her two kids and terrorize the neighborhood, K-horror style.

== B ==
- Baba Wawa Talks to Herself – Rather than talk with celebrities or world leaders, Baba Wawa (Gilda Radner) spends her next TV special interviewing "one tewwific pewson who I weawwy wespect – me!"
- Baby Spanx – Ashamed of having a chubby baby? This elasticized shapewear can smooth out any infant's unsightly fat. As spokesman Jason Sudeikis states, "I would never spank a baby, but I sure as hell would SPANX one!"
- Backstab Island – A promo for a deception-filled ABC reality competition where competitors vow to lie, cheat, steal, have sex, and even throw drinks in each other's faces in order to win "the Backstab crown"... except for one played by episode host Teyana Taylor who isn't down for any of that and just wants to make friendships with everyone.
- Bad Idea Jeans – A commercial featuring scenes of people discussing what can be considered "bad ideas" (for example, "Thought about it and even though it's over, I'm gonna tell my wife about the affair."). After each scene, white text on a black background reads "BAD IDEA". Each scene also zooms in on each person wearing said jeans.
- Bad Seed – A venomous, near-hysterical Nancy Reagan (Terry Sweeney) debunks rumors that daughter Patti Davis' novel, Home Front, is based on real-life, and pitches her own book that she co-wrote with Stephen King.
- Balz-Off – A medication that makes men more sensitive to women by killing off their testosterone levels, as demonstrated by businessman Kevin Nealon and his significant other Jan Hooks.
- Bambi – The 2015 episode hosted by Dwayne Johnson riffs on Disney's tendency to make live-action remakes of their animated films by advertising a tougher, Fast & Furious-esque live-action take on the considerably delicate original animated film starring Johnson as Bambi alongside Fast & Furious colleagues Vin Diesel (Taran Killam) as Thumper, Michelle Rodriguez (Cecily Strong) as Faline ("aka 'the girl Bambi'"), and Tyrese (Jay Pharaoh) as Flower.
- Banshee – NBC staff announcer Ed Herlihy pitches this collection of audio speakers that serve in your place when you can't (or don't want to) attend a funeral. The closing tag line: "First in Last Respects."
- Barkley's Bank – Former NBA player Charles Barkley has opened a bank in which he takes people's money and gambles with it in the hopes of either doubling their money or losing it all.
- Bartenson's Grocery Store – Kathy and Suzanna-Anne-Helen (Kate McKinnon and Aidy Bryant) promote the items shoppers fearing the COVID-19 pandemic bypass in favor of traditional staple foods, including "fluoride bananas," "Mint Pringles," and a "Make Your Own BBQ Kit" (a 400-pound hog, sauce, and a knife). For those shopping online, the store's website also offers replacement suggestions such as salsa for pasta sauce and a DVD of Van Helsing for toilet paper. An ad airing as part of SNL's second-ever "at home" episode in April 2020.
- Bathroom Businessman – This ad starts off as a promo for a fully functional portable office (computer monitors and all) that businessman Kenan Thompson can set up in a public toilet, giving a dual meaning to "doing business." It takes a turn, however, when Thompson finds he can't "do business" because the desk setup has blocked his path to the toilet... and the ad becomes "a public service announcement for Decency," warning viewers to stop checking work texts and e-mails on the toilet ("Nothing's that important… and it's disgusting").
- Bathroom Cobra – To keep his girlfriend (Cecily Strong) from discovering the big stink he just left in the bathroom, episode host Vince Vaughn leaves this real-life venomous cobra on the floor. A cut-for-time skit from April 2013.
- Bathroom Monkey – Housewife Janeane Garofalo uses a disposable simian slave to keep her bathroom clean.
- Beauty and Mr. Beast – Walt Disney Pictures re-imagines its "tale as old as time" in this Season 51 trailer that finds Belle (episode host Nikki Glaser) and her father trapped in a magic castle owned by MrBeast (Ben Marshall), who'll only grant them freedom should crazy stunts be accomplished (e.g. living for 30 days in a Smart car with two sumo wrestlers).
- BeautyBath – When insurgent forces attacking Malacañang Palace gives her far too much stress, Philippine present Corazon Aquino (Jan Hooks) relaxes and recharges in "[her] own private sanctuary of softness" thanks to this bath soap's "soothing caress." A November 1987 parody of Calgon bath soap and its "Calgon, Take Me Away!" ad campaign.
- Be My Quaran-Tine – Nick (Alex Moffat) hasn't had time to find that special someone... until he self-isolates during the COVID-19 pandemic and finds a person who shares the same interests, thoughts, etc. as he does – that person being himself. This digital-exclusive movie trailer, promoting "the best coronavirus rom-com of all time," was filmed during SNL's "at home" period in spring 2020.
- BeReal – A Season 48 ad for "the only honest social media" that requires users to post pictures of their immediate surroundings within a 2-minute window... even if those surroundings include a bank robbery in progress.
- Berkeley Collection (Up Against The Wallpaper) – Jerry Rubin sells wallpaper with popular protest slogans from the 1960s and 1970s, from angry, anti-establishment protests to slogans of peace and love.
- The Best of Klymaxx – Interspersed with footage of the 80s R&B group (played by Amy Poehler, Maya Rudolph, Rachel Dratch, Finesse Mitchell, Kenan Thompson, and episode host Halle Berry) singing some of their biggest hits (e.g. "Meeting in the Ladies Room", "I Miss You", "I'd Still Say Yes"), this ad finds Joey Lawrence (Seth Meyers) try to sell this greatest hits CD to a customer (Fred Armisen)... even though Armisen is clearly not interested in the album and Joey can't take a hint at it.
- Beta Force – Testosterone supplements meant to give men vitality can at times work too well, turning them into overtly aggressive alpha males (especially in bed). Luckily, this supplement is a counter-agent that turns men into their paunchy, mild-mannered middle-aged selves once again.
- The Beygency – A 2014 film trailer in which episode host Andrew Garfield goes on the run from mysterious, Adjustment Bureau-style agents, all because he "turned against his country" and professed to not entirely being a fan of Beyoncé's music (in particular "Drunk in Love"). 24 alums Kiefer Sutherland and Mary Lynn Rajskub have cameo appearances.
- Bierhoff House of German Coats – Two German entrepreneurs (Fred Armisen and episode host Ben Affleck) sell bright orange winter coats to German tourists vacationing in New York City.
- Big Brawn Feminine Napkins – Parodying Brawny paper towels (with a jingle set to the tune of "Big Bad John"), this ad shows giant lumberjack Will Ferrell turning pulp from wood into a super-absorbent (albeit rough-looking) menstruation pad. The ad is capped by Big Brawn literally tearing the roof from normal-sized Molly Shannon's house to deliver her the product.
- Big Dumb products – Two spoofs of large-sized items from the mid-2020s promoted by flighty-voiced internet celebrities:
  - Big Dumb Cups – With acknowledgements to the "Big Dumb Hat" ad that predates it (see below), this January 2024 spoof of the "Stanley cup" craze finds a trio of influencers (Chloe Fineman, Heidi Gardner, and episode host Dakota Johnson) endorsing mugs that tell the world "My favorite rapper is Kesha" or "I'm a virgin, but I have 6 kids."
  - Big Dumb Hat – This December 2022 ad asks, "Are you a well-off woman with straight hair and perfect makeup?" If so, top off your look with these gigantically wide-brimmed hats promoted by Fineman, Gardner, and episode host Amy Schumer ("It's the hat that makes everyone say, 'Oh, her.'").
- Big Red – Made by Bleego (a parody of Mego), this water sprinkler toy depicts a Viking figure (complete with stereotypical horned Viking helmet) that spins around and sprays red liquid from its horns – liquid that is revealed to be hazardous, as evidenced by the thick utility gloves included to clean up the resulting mess.
- Bio-Flex – A parody of exercise equipment commercials where Will Ferrell is attacked by a half-man/half-monkey creature, which (apparently) is considered a workout.
- Bird Bible – "Your family will never be bored by scriptures again" thanks to this kid-oriented pictorial, secular version of the Bible, promoted in a March 2014 ad, that substitutes human figures with images of birds (e.g. a haloed hatchling emerges from its egg to depict Jesus's birth).
- The Bitchslap Method – an infomercial promotes a self-help video course that teaches troubled married couples to bitch-slap their spouses into submission.
- Bizilady – A mini cordless female epilator, made specifically so busy women can shave their body hair anywhere... even if it's a place that would be embarrassing to do so (Jan Hooks shaves her armpits in a Broadway theater, while Victoria Jackson depilates in front of her curly-yellow-haired daughter).
- The Black Lotus – Parodying The White Lotus, this promo promotes a drama series ("coming to HBO and Starz in Spring 2023") set in a luxury hotel whose employees (Punkie Johnson, Ego Nwodim, Kenan Thompson, and episode host Aubrey Plaza) do not take kindly to the demands and antics of wealthy guests.
- Black Widow: Age of Me – Acknowledging criticism for giving female superhero characters the short shrift, Marvel Studios reciprocates with this Season 40 film trailer centered around Black Widow (episode host Scarlett Johansson, reprising her role from Marvel's Cinematic Universe). But rather than a traditional superhero film, it's a romantic comedy that finds Black Widow in the big city, where she works for a fashion magazine, deals with a Miranda Priestly-like boss (played by Kate McKinnon), and falls quickly into romance with supervillain Ultron.
- Bladdivan – A prescription medication (combining powerful drugs, a powerful diuretic, and anti-anxiety medications) that treats cases of "shy bladder syndrome" in men; side effects include "peeing yourself… and not really caring that you peed yourself."
- Blaine Hotel – Part of an early running gag on Weekend Update, this ad bumper has Don Pardo announcing that guests of SNL stay at the Blaine Hotel, but is usually preceded by Update reports of serious incidents (e.g. murder, virus outbreak) taking place at the Blaine.
- Blue River Dog Food – The dog food is featured in two ads:
  - The first, from 2014, finds Cindy and Pat (Cecily Strong and episode host Seth Rogen) offering a testimonial for Blue River, which takes an abrupt turn when Cindy lashes out at the lack of integrity of their previous brand (i.e. it had a chicken on its packaging but only offered "trace amounts of chicken").
  - The second, from 2022, finds Rebecca Anne and her partner (Strong and episode host John Mulaney) berating fellow shopper Heidi Gardner for buying a cheaper, lower-quality dog food instead of Blue River ("It's only 32 cents more a day"), then pleading with Gardner to buy Blue River if she ever wants to see her dog walk again (they're shown sitting in the child seat of Gardner's cart).
- Bok Bok's – A March 2019 ad for a chicken restaurant that insists that its "human-bird hybrid" mascot, Bok Bok (Kate McKinnon), is not "Momo" in a chicken suit and is "not tempting children with chicken to steal their souls" (alluding to the social media hoax).
- Bond 50 – Fittingly airing during a Season 38 episode hosted by then-James Bond actor Daniel Craig, this promo for a DVD collection of all Bond movies released up until that point also shows some forgotten, humorously titled movies that aren't considered canon simply because their Bond girls aren't sexy enough (including a comedic Ellen DeGeneres (Kate McKinnon) in 1989's Honey I Killed the Spy, a Glee-y Lea Michele (Nasim Pedrad) in 2010's Hippopotopussy, a sophomoric Molly Ringwald (Vanessa Bayer) in 1984's The Man Who Was a Gun, and a deeply intimidating Penny Marshall (Fred Armisen) in 2010's Quantum of Leap).
- Boop-It – A Bop It-like memory game that's fun for kids of all ages – including divorced dad Beck Bennett, whose obsession of mastering the flashing toy's honks and turns takes the fun out of time with his children.
- Booty Bidness – Rapper Ludacris (as himself) pitches a new line of women's businesswear with racy phrases on them, such as "Porn Star", "Bi-Curious", "Tasty" (written on the rear end of a skirt), and "Nympho".
- Born This Way baby clothing line – From "Osh Kosh F*gosh" comes this more inclusive collection of infant wear for parents who don't want to automatically assume their toddler will conform as heterosexual or cisgender when they grow up. The onesies display such sayings as "Rock-a-bi baby," "Silence = violence, but crying = hungry," and "I love milk… Harvey Milk! (RIP)"
- Bosley – The hair transplant service offers a new procedure that borrows hair from the pubic region (or "mezzanine" as spokesman Jason Sudeikis refers to it); the result is a coarse and curly patch of new locks on a head that had previously been bald or thin-haired.
- Brad Pitt – Taran Killam parodies Pitt's rambling 2012 pitch work for Chanel No. 5 with this quartet of ads including:
  - A straight-up parody of the Chanel ad, with Killan's Pitt obliging the director's request to sound less coherent by making up words ("splendiferous," "pintalicious").
  - Taco Bell, and how their Doritos Locos Taco is "a great way to make a quick meal when you have between 8 and 20 children."
  - Franklin's Dog Condoms ("Let your dog keep his balls")
  - Jonathan Zizmor, referring to the tattoo removal specialist as "The Subway Doctor" for his ubiquitous advertising on New York City's subway system.
- Bravo – The reality-heavy TV network adds more unscripted drama, each having a tenuous cast connection with the show mentioned before it, among them The Moroccans of Mulholland Drive (centered on a Morocco-born dentist with a celebrity client list), A Coppola Coconuts (featuring two granddaughters of Francis Ford Coppola), and the self-explanatory The Real Houseplants of Beverly Hills.
- Brew Dude – A hat that dispenses beer for the college student who would rather party than study (Will Ferrell in this case).
- Broadview Security – A parody of the actual Broadview Security commercials that infer that women living alone in large houses are the most likely to be victimized by any man she meets (including male family members, androgynous singer k.d. lang, two kids using a trenchcoat posing as an adult, and even spokesman Bill Hader).
- Broderick & Ganz – An ad for a team of personal injury lawyers, with happy clients praising the work of the skilled Broderick (Kate McKinnon) and one disgruntled client (episode host Aziz Ansari) disappointed over his representation by the incompetent Ganz (Bobby Moynihan).
- Brogaine – "Because no one wants to be the bald guy in the frat," this version of Rogaine is designed for male college students suffering from premature hair loss caused by stress-causing factors of college life (e.g. "nerds", "midterms", worrying their frat dog is an alcoholic, chanting "the n-word" in a viral video).
- Broken – CBS, seeking the award glory that comedy dramas Transparent and Orange is the New Black have earned, premieres this show centered around a family of professors (portrayed by Vanessa Bayer, Cecily Strong, and episode host Tom Hanks) who are all diagnosed with depression on the same day. The show is clearly dour and dramatic, but since it's 30 minutes in length, CBS considers it a comedy and gives it the same lighthearted promotional approach as its sitcoms.
- Brutal Marriage Movie – This cut-for-time trailer from Season 47 promotes a movie documenting the overly dramatic struggles between a married couple played by "two [scene-chewing] actors who fully expect Oscars" (Heidi Gardner and episode host Rami Malek). The film comes from "the producer of Marriage Story" and "a director going through a divorce himself."
- The Bubble – This November 2016 ad promotes a proposed domed community (formerly the New York City borough of Brooklyn) with a diverse, progressive atmosphere (hybrid cars, coffee shops, used book stores, money bearing Bernie Sanders' portrait, etc.). The community is marketed toward millennials and liberals who are scared to live in America now that Donald Trump won the presidency, but would prefer not to leave the country.
- Buddweiser Light – a parody of the Bud Light "Bring Out Your Best" ad campaign, featuring hockey player Joe Piscopo mentally readying himself against faceoff opponent Robin Williams. Piscopo says of Williams in the voiceover, "I can't believe my wife ran away with him," which inspires Piscopo to instigate a fight as soon as the puck is dropped. The ad ends with Williams and Piscopo sitting on the ice bloodied, gap-toothed, and enjoying a couple of beers.
- Buffalo Wild Wings – This Season 50 ad promotes the restaurant chain as the place to be on Sundays for NFL football, wings, and beer... though for "real Patriots fan" Sean (episode host Bill Burr, reprising his character from Season 46's Samuel Adams ad), it's a place where he can get away from his wife, gripe about his team, and berate his adult son (Mikey Day) over his parental skills.
- Buffy the Vampire Slayer – A promo for The WB series announces that with Seinfeld leaving the air, Buffy Summers (episode host Sarah Michelle Gellar) would be moving to New York to become the "Elaine" to an un-dead Jerry, George, and Kramer, thus transforming Buffy into "A show about nothing… and vampires!"
- Bug-Off – Rather than simply killing a cockroach, this bug trap painfully tortures them and, as Will Ferrell puts it, "gives them a lot to think about". The trap supposedly creates a signal that encourages the cockroach to enter, then adhesive glue holds the bug fast (much like a rat trap). Then, three tweezers stretch the legs in opposite directions til they snap off. Then a white-hot metal coil comes down and burns off the bug's reproductive glands of as well as making a sizable hole. Then the bug is beat senseless by its own dismembered legs. Finally, two pieces of cotton stuffed into the cockroach's orifices as food is dangled in front of it. Two kids are seen peering gleefully through a patented "viewing window".
- Buh-Weet Sings – All grown up, Buckwheat (Eddie Murphy) from the Our Gang/Little Rascals films has recorded a compilation of songs sung in his own and very personal style, such as "Fee Tines a Mady", "Una Panoonah Banka", "Wookin' Pa Nub", "???" and, in a dedication to his friend Alfalfa, "Barbah ob Dabill".
- Bunny Business Soundtrack – Ahead of the release of an animated motion picture about "a couple of bunnies with a lot of ambition," its accompanying soundtrack is promoted in this Season 35 ad. The album features songs by the likes of Randy Newman (Fred Armisen), Natalie Merchant (Kristen Wiig), and Shakira (episode host Taylor Swift).
- Burger Master – a fast food restaurant where people can get their burgers done any way they want—no matter how weird or disgusting the request may be.
- Business Garden Inn & Suites & Hotel Room Inn – Whether you're staying for business travel, interventions, or "after-prom hand stuff," this budget hotel will provide "every amenity required by law" (e.g. tightly wrapped bars of soap, "curtains with sticks attached," continental breakfasts that have "cereal in gumball machines"). Take it from front desk clerks Kathreen and Kathlyn (Kate McKinnon and episode host Billie Eilish): "As we always say, 'We may not be the Ritz-Carlton.'"
- By Yourself: The Musical – A cut-for-time Season 48 promo for a new Broadway musical that celebrates "the little songs we sing to ourselves" when we're alone and doing such minutae as eating chicken, petting cats, or shopping online.

== C ==
- C.E.O Dreamboats – a magazine with famous businessmen as objects of desire for teenyboppers.
- Calgon laundry detergent – A May 2000 parody of Calgon's long-running ad set in a Chinese laundry ("Ancient Chinese secret, huh?"). Here, however, shopkeeper Mr. Ling (episode host Jackie Chan), upon hearing his wife (then-SNL-newbie Maya Rudolph) exclaim "We need more Calgon!", uses martial arts tactics to make sure overhearing customer Chris Parnell keeps the "secret" a secret.
- Calvin Klein Cream Pies – in a parody of Andie MacDowell-starred Calvin Klein Jeans commercials, Julia Louis-Dreyfus portrays MacDowell as an annoying model who gets hit in the face with a custard pie after one of her shallow, rambling stories.
- Calvin Klein Industrial Strength Jeans – A plus-sized Elizabeth Taylor (episode host Joan Rivers) models CK Jeans, rambles on about her movie career, and snacks on some nearby food in this Season 8 parody.
- Calvin Klein Underwear – CK spokesperson Justin Bieber (Kate McKinnon) appears in a trio of 2015 ads; though Justin says, "I'm a big boy now", he behaves immaturely, poses and preens for the camera, and leaves fellow model Lara Stone (Cecily Strong) unimpressed.
- Camel Tame – When placed "between your clothes and your business," this insert helps prevent the unsightly showing of a woman's camel toe... but resembles a male bulge as a result.
- Canis Cologne for Dogs – A parody of Calvin Klein's fragrances and accompanying sensual ads, here featuring a dog getting out of a courtyard pool and kissing (and humping the leg of) a shirtless male model.
- Caracci's Pizza – This 1992 ad states that if a pizza is unsanitary in any way, "you get half off-a da pizza!", according to Robert Smigel's Italian chef character.
- Caribbean Essence Bath Oil – foaming, scented bath enhancer that causes a West Indian man (Tracy Morgan) to pop up during the bath and carry his bathers across a beach.
- Carl Weathers for Governor – Following in the footsteps of his Predator co-stars Arnold Schwarzenegger and Jesse "The Body" Ventura, Carl Weathers promotes himself to be the next governor in any state that will take him.
- The Chad & Mrs. Douglas Show Holiday DVD – Chad and Victoria Douglas (Taran Killam and Vanessa Bayer) promote a Time Life DVD collection of Christmas musical performances from their 1970s TV variety series, which feature guests who were clearly imbibing on drug & drink vices of the era.
- Carter 'N Sons BBQ – Bobby Moynihan plays proprietor Rodney Carter in this commercial for a barbecue restaurant produced in 2002 but airing in 2009, augmented with disclaimers stating that the restaurant's "Swine Fever" marketing tagline is in no way connected to the then-recent swine flu (H1N1 virus) pandemic, nor is their Sausage And Ribs Sampler related in any way to SARS.
- Cartier Fidget Spinner – A 14-carat-gold, diamond-encrusted fidget spinner for the woman who is glamorous yet easily distracted (in this case Vanessa Bayer).
- Celtic Woman – It's "the cultural event your godmother described as perfection," as the Irish singing group (Aidy Bryant, Kate McKinnon, Cecily Strong, and episode host Anya Taylor-Joy) hits the road for a Summer 2021 tour of the U.S. Hear them sing deep-cut and loosely original songs... along with a random assortment of non-Gaelic tunes (e.g. "Sweet Home Alabama") American audiences kinda want to hear more of.
- Chalmers Reserve Event Wine – Trett and Leezan Chalmers (Kenan Thompson and Cecily Strong), former stars of the reality TV show The Nastiest Summer Renters of Sag Harbor, introduce their fine wine that's 72% grain alcohol and costs only $1 a bottle. Why the low price? An Italian couple (Kyle Mooney and episode host Emma Stone) who makes the wine reveals an ingredient list of twigs, yellow corn, and moldy grapes that didn't make the cut for better wines ("We think it's for the dogs").
- The Chameleon XLE – A luxury car on the inside, a dilapidated wreck on the outside – but all the better to deter the high risk of theft that accompanies luxury vehicles. The car features a simulated transmission fluid leak, mismatched hubcaps, one exposed wheel painted school bus yellow, coat hanger antenna... and a supple leather-and-wood interior.
- Chanel and Chanel Interior Designs for Airbnb – Respectively played by episode host Sydney Sweeney and Chloe Troast, Chanel and Chanel (the latter pronounces her name "channel") will design the property you're renting out to vacationers to look as bland as possible (e.g. inoffensive artwork, 700 K-cups in the kitchen, owner closets with complicated locks).
- Chantix – Two parodies for the prescription medication used to treat nicotine addiction and its advertising that uses "real people [with] real stories":
  - The first, from 2012, lists mental side effects that are worse than nicotine addiction itself, which user Kristen Wiig slowly discovers she has, much to husband Bill Hader's consternation (e.g. "If you notice changes in behavior such as a powerful, overwhelming desire to kill the person you love most, call your doctor right away.").
  - The second ad, from 2018, emphasizes that Chantix user Kelly (Cecily Strong) is not an actress... although she's quick to correct that she once was, and spends the rest of the ad less praising Chantix and more resurrecting her long-dormant acting skills.
- ChatGPTío – OpenAI creates a version of its generative AI service ChatGPT that's less friendly, more authentic, and is powered by middle-aged, opinionated Latino uncles. Marcello Hernández and episode host Bad Bunny depict the chatbot icons.
- cheapkids.net – Chris Parnell appears in a trio of ads for a website dedicated to the sale of shoddy items for babies and toddlers for irresponsible parents, including - but not limited to - pre-owned pacifiers, a "Babie's First Speller" book that has clearly incorrect spelling (a cane is spelled "C!5q"), and a meningitis vaccine that "may be contaminated". "When it comes to your kids, why pay more?"
- The Cheese Game – George Plimpton (as himself) pitches this game for parents (Chris Parnell and Amy Poehler) who want their son to grow up to be come the gourmets they are. "Note: Children learn at different paces. For some, the Cheese Game may not be an effective teaching tool. Some children, when playing the Cheese Game, may be beaten by other other children at school."
- Cheques – While sending money can be as routine as clicking on a smart phone app, a check provides a noir-flavored air when paying your daughter's boyfriend (so she'll never see him again), your maid (so she forgets about what she saw in the gazebo), or your poison supplier ("Just one sip, and I become head of the board").
- Cherry Grove – Logo pairs its upcoming reality show Fire Island with this companion series focusing on a group of affluent lesbians who, unlike the hard-partying gay men of Fire Island one beach over, get no raunchier than sharing a fondness for dinner, wine, song, jigsaw puzzles, and water birth.
- Chess for Girls! – A parody of gender-based marketing of children's toys, this chess set (unrelated to the chess game in general) by "Mottel" features pieces with Barbie doll-style bodies and chess piece heads, an accompanying dollhouse, beachwear, minivan, bubble blower, and so on (prompting an "O...kay?" from dad Will Ferrell when his sweet little daughters tell him "We're playing chess!"). The tag line: "A classic game of strategy and wits… and bubbles!"
- Chewable Pampers – When it comes to diaper duty, eco-friendly mom Kristen Wiig prefers this line of Pampers diapers which contain flavor crystals that, once the diaper is soiled, turns into an edible treat.
- Chia Head – A parody of both the Chia Pet and Minoxidil; men with bald or receding hairlines use this product to give them nice green hair just like a Chia Pet. ("Not to be used in salads!")
- Chicago Improv – A promo for the latest series in producer Dick Wolf's Chicago-based TV franchise, with the city's improvisational comedy scene and those who populate it depicted in the same gritty, unflinching way as its firefighting and law enforcement worlds.
- Chickham Apple Farm – Just in time for the apple-picking season, Debra Chickham (Aidy Bryant), her sister (Kate McKinnon), and Hank the farmhand (episode host Woody Harrelson), promote their orchard located in "the part of New York state that has Confederate flags." Visitors can have fun at the petting zoo, haunted hayride, and, yes, the apple orchard ("For $45, you can bring home $10 worth of apples").
- Chonk – This clothing store offers fashions that let women be "gorgeous at any size"; much to the models' clear dismay, however, the store bears an uncomplimentary name. Also featured is "Lil' Chonk" for tween girls (Mom ushers her young model out of camera range), and the menswear store "Normal Clothes", where guys can make a quick trip to find clothes in their size.
- Chris Rock's White Person's Guide to Surviving The Apollo – Chris Rock, a veteran of Harlem's famed Apollo Theater, promotes his video that gives tips to aspiring white comedians and singers on how to win over The Apollo's vociferously critical audiences. Siobhan Fallon and episode host Rob Morrow appear in before-and-after footage.
- Cialis for Threeways – Erectile dysfunction medication that's 50% stronger than regular Cialis "just in case that rare opportunity arises," and also includes anti-depressants ("to help you cope with the inevitable shame and regret") and Xanax (to help you make it through the argumentative fallout the next morning).
- Cialis Turnt – An ad for "the only pill that combats your erectile dysfunction while giving you that unbeatable hip-hop sensation of 'getting turnt.'" To demonstrate its effectiveness, Taran Killam and Aidy Bryant are shown dancing wildly to music similar to Lil Jon's song "Turn Down for What" that includes the exclamation "Everybody, get turnt!" "If you are turnt for more than 6 hours, congratulations; you are now legally Lil Wayne."
- Citizens for a Better America – Dr. Swen Gazzara (Gilbert Gottfried) proves the value of hard work in America by asking Ronald Reagan to personally give him a "humble job" (which he shortens to "hum job").
- Clancy T. Bachleratt and Jackie Snad albums – A quartet of ads promote collaboration albums by "patriotic country musicians" Clancy (Will Forte) and Jackie (Kristen Wiig), on which they perform songs about the four things they know best: Spaceships, toddlers, Model-T cars, and jars of beer.
- Classical Music Classics – An ad for an album that modernizes classical music pieces by giving them lyrics ("Dudes, we gots to get some Taco Bell! I'm really jonesing for a Meximelt!").
- Clear-Rite – Karen (Kristen Wiig) speaks the praises of an "invisible" teeth retainer. The twist is that the product isn't real (it's superglue), Karen isn't her real name (it's Beth), and the ad isn't an ad (Beth's just practicing her pitch work before the bathroom mirror).
- Clearasil – Appearing during SNL's Sprockets (a recurring skit that parodied German art culture), this ad finds a young woman using Clearasil (or, with a strong German accent, "Clärasil") to get rid of her pimples and impress her new boyfriend. The English word "pimples", however, is confused in the sketch with "pimplen", a strong German slang word with the same meaning as the English "fuck" (in the sexual sense). As a result, the commercial tagline ("mach das pimplen kaput") implies that Clearasil will destroy one's sex life.
- Cleveland Cavaliers – This cut-for-time team promo from Season 43 highlights "The Other Cavaliers," i.e. those who ride on the shoulders (literally) of go-to man LeBron James, including a Roomba at point guard, a golden retriever as starting center, and one player (episode host Donald Glover) who's good at rolling the ball up the court on an inbound in order to preserve time on the shot clock.
- Closet Organizer – A man in a blue Spandex suit (Will Forte) is hired to organize anything in a closet that someone throws in.
- Clovin Hind Jeans – Three spoofs of Dick Avedon's Calvin Klein commercials which featured numerous supermodels of the day. Here, Brooke Shields (Gail Matthius), in between wardrobe changes, talks about how Clovin Hind Jeans are literally her love language ("If they could talk, I could act!").
- Club Shay Shay: Extended Cut – In January 2024, Katt Williams reignited feuds and made gripes against several comedians in an episode of Shannon Sharpe's Club Shay Shay podcast. But according to this ad, 8 additional hours of Williams' (Ego Nwodim) claims are on YouTube, where he tells Sharpe (Devon Walker) that, among other things, he invented fruit, he penned Barack Obama's "Yes We Can" campaign slogan, and that Hollywood made Kevin Hart "in the same factory where they make Teddy Grahams" (replying to a doubting Sharpe, "Then why the hell he smell like cinnamon?").
- Cluckin' Chicken – When asked why he tastes so good, a fast-food restaurant's animated mascot (voiced by Adam Sandler) gleefully describes the process by which he is killed, decapitated, eviscerated, and flame-broiled... then, displaying a schematic chart, describes how he is consumed, digested, and eventually eliminated through defecation.
- Clysler-Prymouth – A spoof of Lee Iacocca's Chrysler-Plymouth "Made in America" ads; here, however, Iacocca (Joe Piscopo) explains that the only part of a Clysler-Prymouth car that's manufactured in America is the floor mats.
- CNN Pregnancy Test – Just like its namesake network, this home pregnancy test delivers "relentless breaking news" alerts to a couple waiting (impatiently) to learn if they're expecting a baby.
- CNZen – A Calm-like app for those who despise Donald Trump and seek peace in hearing CNN anchors and commentators soothingly analyze how damning a recent legal indictment is for the former president ("In your mind, he's already in jail").
- The Coconut Bangers Ball: It's a Rap! – Robert Goulet (Will Ferrell), in a convertible, promotes his new album of rap songs sung in a lounge style (such as "Thong Song" and "Big Poppa") in this 2000 ad. It later got a sequel in Murder in the Make-Believe Ballroom, in which Goulet covers songs by musical guest Jay-Z (with Jay's approval).
- Coffees of the World – Robin Duke prefers exotic Coffees of the World to more standard brews... even though, instead of being beans harvested from far-off locations like Sumatra and Colombia, they're literally flavored with international flavors (like chicken parmesan and avgolemono).
- Coldcock Malt Liquor – Tim Meadows appears in this riff on Billy Dee Williams' pitchwork for Colt 45; with each sip of this beverage, an animated fist arises from the can's label to whack the drinker upside the jaw. Ellen Cleghorne ("I ain't afraid of no can of beer!") and Chris Rock also endorse the drink.
- Cologuard – A spoof of ads for the colorectal cancer screening kit and its animated box mascot. Here, the kit (voiced here by James Austin Johnson), which calls himself "Thomas," arrives on the doorstep of episode host Woody Harrelson, but after Woody appears uncomfortable when Thomas says, "Open me up and, you know, go inside me," other animated kits, including a female caricature named "Kylie" (voiced by Chloe Fineman), offer to step in instead.
- Colon Blow – In a parody of high-fiber cereal ads (notably Total and its "how many bowls" campaign), an off-screen voice tells cereal eater Phil Hartman he will need 30,000 bowls of his usual cereal to equal the fiber content in a single bowl of Colon Blow (2.5 million to equal Super Colon Blow, which is also promoted here). When the large numbers are quoted, a pyramid of the same number of bowls elevates Hartman into the ionosphere.
- Colonel Belmont's Old Fashioned Horse Glue – Will Ferrell plays Langford T. Belmont, a man whose family has been in the horse glue business for generations. A parody of commercials that try to appeal to old-fashioned values and tradition.
- Commode & Commode – Attorneys Denzel & Latrice Commode (Kenan Thompson and episode host Regina King) promise financial compensation for those facing hardships from using Gorilla Glue in place of beauty product, as has happened to members of the Commode family who offer testimonials. A spoof of the "Gorilla Glue Girl" story that went viral the week of this Season 46 ad.
- Complicit – A perfume specifically tailored for First Daughter Ivanka Trump (episode host Scarlett Johansson), who the voiceover positions in this Season 42 ad as a glamorous yet duplicitous part of her controversial father's (Alec Baldwin) presidency. The tagline: "The fragrance for the woman who could stop all of this, but won't."
- Compulsion – A "Calvin Kleen" disinfectant, parodying Calvin Klein's Obsession perfume and featuring an obsessive compulsive spokesmodel (played by Jan Hooks).
- Convention Cutaways! – "Like every American, you LOVE the Republican and Democrat National Conventions." But as patriotic as the speeches and pageantry tend to be, the "most glorious part" of the conventions are the audience shots from the TV broadcasts. So they're collected in this DVD compilation, featuring such cutaways as "Guy Who Just Bought Props That Only Make Sense to Him" (Fred Armisen), "Middle Eastern Woman They Keep Cutting To Whenever Someone Mentions Hispanics" (Nasim Pedrad), "Woman Who's Sobbing Before Anyone's Started Speaking" (Vanessa Bayer), "Guy Who's Pretending He Wasn't Just Asleep" (Kenan Thompson), "Kid Who Is Not So Cute" (Bobby Moynihan), and Joe Biden (Jason Sudeikis) ("Hey! Look at... look at what they found!"). "Order today... so we know if we should make them."
- Cookie Dough Sport – A parody of Gatorade sports drink for athletes who are having a hard time and eat cookie dough out of stress and depression.
- CoolPAP – A cut-for-time ad from Season 51 promotes a CPAP machine that features various non-standard masks in various caricatures (e.g. surgeon, fighter pilot, Guy Fawkes) for users with sleep apnea.
- Corn Chip Nail Tips – Maya Rudolph and Tracy Morgan appear in this parody of "hip" potato chip commercials, promoting corn chips that double as false fingernails ("low in sodium, high in fun") that come in five different flavors (regular, barbecue, tandoori chicken, mesquite barbecue (likely a spicier version of barbecue), "and BEEF!", as hobo Horatio Sanz excitedly states).
- Corn Syrup Producers of America – In this trade group ad, Kristen Wiig inquisitively asks Nasim Pedrad about why she serves her daughter juice with high-fructose corn syrup. Pedrad responds by saying she'd rather "trust scientists" who espouse favorable data (e.g. corn syrup is natural, it's okay in moderation) than "stay-at-home mom Sheila from down the street who's having wine at 10 A.M." (a catty dig aimed at a speechless Wiig).
- Count Chocula Silver – Count Chocula (Jimmy Fallon) promotes a newer version of his cereal that includes ingredients that help promote regularity and good heart health along with "kooky marshmallow bats! Bwa-ah-ah-ah-ah!"
- CouplaBeers – When episode host Shane Gillis found his life at a low point, he discovered "this revolutionary medicine that treats anxiety and depression fast"... though side effects include drowsiness, which can be alleviated by taking another medication promoted in this Season 50 ad, ALilBump.
- COVID – Feeling burned out from having to tend to family, friends, and work? This Season 48 ad encourages you to "ask your doctor about COVID," which can guarantee a long vacation from everything despite such side effects as "having COVID, which is still kind of bad, but doesn't it feel different now?" Since COVID "isn't for everybody," the Always Positive COVID-19 Home Test (which has two positive lines already drawn on) is also promoted.
- Cracklin' Oat Flakes (Now with Ecstasy) – Will Ferrell wakes up to find that he has run out of his regular Cracklin' Oat Flakes, but his wife (Ana Gasteyer) offers this MDMA-laced version. After one bowl, Ferrell creeps out his coworkers, makes out with Chris Parnell, then runs half-naked through the streets until he's seen in bed with a pacifier in his mouth and playing with a glowstick.
- Crazy Edelman – A Season 9 ad for a Crazy Eddie-like "discount psychologist" (Joe Piscopo) promising "the lowest prices on all types of therapy" ("Our prices are so low, I must have an inferiority complex!").
- Creeley's Soup – Off-screen announcer Bill Murray tries to talk a child (Gilda Radner) into exchanging the soup she's eating for various items. When she becomes annoyed ("No! Leave me alone! I'm eating!"), the announcer successfully talks her into not only stuffing corn from the soup into her nose but pouring the rest onto her nose ("Because the Soupman says so"). The product's tagline: "Creeley's Soup – The Child Handler".
- The Crests and Troughs of Vernon Hawley, Jr. – This "special TV offer" promotes a 3-record compilation from "one of country's most enduring, yet erratic, superstars" (episode host John Larroquette), whose song repertoire deals with his battles with the bottle ("I hope you remember these ol' tunes… 'cause I don't").
- Cricket Wireless – On the week when FEMA and the FCC tested their wireless alert system, one the White House would use only in a national emergency, this October 2018 ad makes it appear that Donald Trump will use these "Presidential Alerts" to express the same type of opinions he shares on Twitter. Luckily for those who use Cricket, they won't receive such endless alerts at all ("Now are you happy we have awful service?").
- Cruz for Texas – Footage from a campaign rally makes up this ad for Texas Senator Ted Cruz's (Beck Bennett) 2018 re-election effort. While a "hype team" (Kenan Thompson and episode host Awkwafina) is able to liven up the crowd, things fall apart for Cruz, literally and figuratively, after he takes the stage.
- Crystal Gravy – A parody of the clear consumer products fad of the mid-1990s, specifically Crystal Pepsi. Julia Sweeney enjoys a drumstick dipped in clear gravy straight from the jar ("Someone just got a taste of the future"), while Kevin Nealon gleefully splashes his face in the clear, gooey liquid.
- CVS Pharmacy – For the guys who forgot to get their girlfriends something for Valentine's Day, CVS is the perfect place to find it at the last minute, be it teddy bears in bee costumes ("Bee Mine"), valentine-themed Teenage Mutant Ninja Turtles chocolates, or a Christmas stocking priced at an 80% markdown.

== D ==
- Dad Christmas – Aidy Bryant plays a travel agent who shows two children from a divorced family (played by Pete Davidson and episode host Claire Foy) all the amenities that come with traveling to Florida to celebrate "Dad Christmas": the lighting of an indoor cigarette, their father (played by Mikey Day) introducing them to an older woman named Dierdre (played by Kate McKinnon), their father getting into Jimmy Buffett music, the lack of any kind of rules and structure, and, when they're older, the opportunity to do drugs with him. "Dad Christmas: The sad part is, he really tried hard."
- Dallas: The Home Game – Charles Rocket pitches a board game where dysfunctional families can act out their issues the same way the Ewings do on the prime time soap opera Dallas.
- Damn It, My Mom Is On Facebook filter – When college students learn their moms just added them as Facebook friends, they can apply this filter that bowdlerizes the wild photographs and rebellious opinions they want hidden from Mom.
- Darnette Disposable Toilet – Will Ferrell extols the toilet that you throw away after only one use. It takes just as many steps to install and remove as a regular toilet and costs $169.95.
- Daveheart – A movie trailer for a Braveheart sequel focusing on William Wallace's brother and "Scotland's biggest coward," Dave Wallace (episode host Gerard Butler), who'd rather retreat or surrender than fight with the British.
- The Day Beyoncé Turned Black – A movie trailer interpreting the reaction to the release of Beyoncé's "Formation", a song noted for its embracing of Black heritage, as an apocalyptic-style film. White Americans are shown in mass hysteria over their realization that Beyoncé is Black while Black Americans appear apathetic.
- Dead Bopz – Talking to the viewers through hologram, Bing Crosby (Beck Bennett) (who flat-out states he's "dooby-dooby-dooby-dead") offers this album of other holographic dead singers singing today's biggest hits, such as Roy Orbison (Taran Killam) doing a rock-and-roll remake of Justin Bieber's "Sorry", Tupac Shakur (Jay Pharoah) flipping Taylor Swift's "Shake It Off" into a gangsta rap anthem, Ginger Rogers (Kate McKinnon) and Fred Astaire (Kyle Mooney) dueting on Pitbull's "Give Me Everything", and Lesley Gore (episode host Brie Larson) girl-group-ifying Big Sean and Nicki Minaj's "Dance (Ass)" (shortly afterward, "Brie Larson as Lesley Gore Singing Nicki Minaj" became a minor internet meme).
- Deidra Wurtz, Downsizing Expert – If you need to break the news about staffing layoffs, divorces, or even pillaged Bosnian villages, let Deidra (Abby Elliott) deliver it in a sincere, caring, yet flighty way ("I feel really bad about it, but it is what it is") that will leave those on the receiving end appreciative and understanding.
- Dell Stator's 99-cent Toad Ranch – "Home of the World Famous Dell Stator Toad Pit and the Dell Stator Patented Broiling Method, where we can guarantee you the best 99-cent toad steak you'll ever eat!"
- Delta Disruptive — With unruly in-flight behavior on the rise, and since Delta Air Lines still wants their money, erratic passengers can now misbehave all they want while quarantined in a "crazy section" separated by 4-inch-thick, soundproof plexiglass from the rest of the plane ("currently available on all domestic flights within Florida").
- Democratic National Committee – "The Dems are back!" So exclaim Nancy Pelosi (Kate McKinnon), Dianne Feinstein (Cecily Strong), a Spanish-speaking Tim Kaine (Mikey Day), and other long-prominent and "new faces" (e.g. Joe Biden, Hillary Clinton) of the Democratic Party who are celebrating their state-level victories in 2017 but now turn to progressive issues and attracting "window-lickers from Ohio [and] mouth breathers from Wisconsin" who might not lean Democratic at the polls come 2018.
- Democratic Party 2018 Campaign – Progressive-leaning voters express confidence in this ad that Democratic candidates will win in the 2018 midterm elections and put the administration of Donald Trump in check... despite being visibly worried (e.g. sweaty armpits, wavering enthusiasm in their voices, drinking heavily, sudden violent behavior around friends and family, screaming so loud that glass shatters) over the possibility of a "blue wave" not materializing. The closing tag line: "Vote! Please?"
- Democrats for Ferguson – Unlike his opponent, Terry Ferguson (Will Ferrell) is not a Washington insider, does not have interns working for him, and because he lost his testicles in a fire 23 years earlier, does not have sex with anyone ("The thought of sex gives him phantom pains!"). Ergo, he's the best choice for the U.S. Senate.
- Depend Legends – Incontinent yet ashamed to wear adult diapers? You don't have to be when Depend offers a line of diapers with images of classic stars of the past (e.g. Clark Gable, Jack Paar, Mickey Mantle). The tagline: "Make History. In your pants."
- Derek Jeter's Taco Hole – Episode host Jeter pitches a taco restaurant in Nutley, New Jersey, with a jingle sung to the Beach Boys song "Kokomo".
- Dianne Feinstein – After she was seen dismissing a Green New Deal proposal to combat climate change in front of a classroom full of children, the California Senator (Cecily Strong) offers to "make things right" in this cut-for-time political ad from Season 44. However, just as before, she spends one outtake after another arguing with students, parents, and teachers (to one kid who calls her mean, she responds, "Well, your dad wishes you were bullied more; toughen you up a little bit").
- Diet Coke by Olay – Whether you drink it or splash it on your face, this facial cleanser widens your pores, defies wrinkles, and gives you "fresh, clean, caffeinated skin."
- Dillon/Edwards Investments – This 1999 ad promotes a financial firm that took a slow, cautious approach to providing services on the Internet; when they were ready to do so, they took the only domain name available: "www.clownpenis.fart".
- Direct Hits – Episode host George McGovern pitches a new album comprising popular songs reworked to reflect how America's military has strengthened for the Cold War (e.g. "The Night We Drove Allende Down", "Three Minutes to Midnight at the Oasis", "Have You Seen Another Navy Landing in the Shallows?", "Guerillas Just Want to Have Guns"), complete with reworked artist names (Men at War, PLO Speedwagon).
- Disco Meltdown – A Season 6 ad promotes a hip, new dance club in the reactor core of a nuclear power plant.
- Discover Card – Card user Ego Nwodim is alerted to peculiar charges on her bill (e.g. giant scissors, red jumpsuits, hundreds of rabbits). When she calls Discover's service line, she is greeted by her raspy-voiced doppelgänger. A spoof of the credit card's "We treat you like you'd treat you" campaign by way of the horror film Us.
- Disney Channel Acting School – Miley Cyrus (as herself) and Raven-Symoné (Kenan Thompson) promote a school where students train to act "the Disney way," learning techniques such as "Disrespecting Authority," "Pause Then Dis," and "Reacting To Stinky Feet."
- Dissing Your Dog – Will Ferrell sells a dog training video for passive aggressive dog owners. "Just remember you're a mother(expletive)in' dog!"
- Divided We Stand – This ad promotes an Off-Broadway musical that dives head-first into the contentious American political climate, though its book, songs, and cast leave a bad impression on both critics ("Time Out New York calls it 'Dangerously oversimplified'") and audiences ("I guess the worst part of the play was their confidence in it").
- Dog Bones-n-Melodies – The 1990s hip-hop group Bone Thugs-N-Harmony (Ego Nwodim, Chris Redd, Kenan Thompson, and episode host Jonathan Majors) open a store that sells nothing but various types of bones for dogs (big bones, small bones, chicken bones, dinosaur bones, etc.). Make a purchase and the group will serenade you with one of their hits before you leave.
- Doggie Duty Soundtrack – A Season 37 ad analogous to the ones for the Bunny Business and Horse Play soundtracks that predate it. Here, Randy Newman (Fred Armisen), Florence Welch (episode host Katy Perry), and "the guy from Spin Doctors" (Andy Samberg) contribute tunes to a "heartwarming" animated movie about "12 puppies selected for jury duty."
- Donald Trump's House of Wings – Trump (as himself) promotes his own buffalo chicken wing restaurant that was once "a defunct Meineke muffler shop in Englewood, New Jersey." He's helped by endorser David Crosby (Horatio Sanz) and chicken-costumed employees (Seth Meyers, Kenan Thompson, Amy Poehler and Maya Rudolph) who sing a jingle set to "Jump (For My Love)".y
- Donheiser – Shown during Die Squaren ost Berliner, a German version of Hollywood Squares that was performed entirely in the German language (though this ad is in English), this ad stars Dana Carvey as Phil Donahue's German counterpart, whose show mirrors Donahue in every way... except for the fact that the audience is almost entirely empty ("Ja, und if she is ze only audience member, zen ze show is running vell!").
- Don't Buy Stuff You Cannot Afford – A financially struggling couple (Amy Poehler and episode host Steve Martin) hear Chris Parnell promote a book that tells of a simple way to get out of debt: "If you don't have any money, you should not buy anything."
- Don' You Go Rounin' Roun to Re Ro – A film trailer for "the toughest, grittiest, most British crime drama of the year," one that appears to be about a reformed criminal (Bill Hader) who's forced back into the business... that is, if the audience can comprehend the Cockney dialects and slang.
- Dopenhagen and Happy Daze – David Carradine plays a cowboy who likes to get high on marijuana he can chew instead of smoke. A none-too-subtle parody of Copenhagen chewing tobacco.
- Double R — Texas businessman Rudy Randolph, Jr. (Randy Quaid) and his son Rudy Randolph III (Robert Downey, Jr.) promote their liquidation-sale outlets in a trio of Season 11 ads that include:
  - Double R Rolls, where you can buy from the massive fleet of luxry Rolls-Royces that Bhagwan Shree Rajneesh left behind in Rajneeshpuram
  - Gulf Coast Furniture Warehouse, which Rudy, Jr. inherited after his father's passing and is staging a massive "Stink Sale" of items that still have that dead body smell
  - Ferdinand Marcos Malacanang Palace Liquidation Sale, where Rudy sells shirts, shoes, brassieres, and other various items from the residence of the deposed Philippine president and his wife
- Downton Abbey – At first, it appears to be a trailer for the motion picture revival of the beloved British TV series, right down to the film's premise (Downton is readied for a visit by the King and Queen). But it's peppered with unflattering quotes from critics (e.g. "Were the stakes in the show always this low?" asks A. O. Scott). The stealthy reveal at the very end: It's actually a promo for Joker, admitting that that comic book film is not perfect, "but at least stuff happens."
- Dr. Deborah Birx Scarves – Dr. Birx (Chloe Fineman), White House response coordinator during the COVID-19 pandemic, finds it frustrating that all the public pays attention to during her briefings are the scarves adorning her outfit. But in this digital-exclusive ad from May 2020, she leans in by creating a line of scarves, including one that literally says "Screw you, I'm a doctor," another in bird patterns (because Birx loves birds), and others made from periodic tables and actual CDC statements ("If this is the only thing you're zeroing in on while I'm talking, let's make it count").
- Dr. Porkenheimer's Boner Juice – A parody of erectile dysfunction treatments (particularly Levitra), complete with the warning "If you experience an erection lasting longer than twenty-four hours, call up your friends and brag about it." Levitra's slogan "strong and lasting" is replaced here by "thick and sturdy". At the end, Amy Poehler proudly says of husband Rob Riggle, "That guy? Yeah, he's my boner."
- Dr. Uncle Jimmy's Smokehouse and Outpatient Surgical Facility – A shady clinic that offers semi-professional surgical procedures and mediocre barbecue cuisine.
- The Drew Barrymore Show – The daytime talk show gets parodied in this Season 46 promo. "After seeing what went down with Ellen," the voiceover remarks (in reference to that show's allegedly toxic work environment), "we took a hard turn in the other direction," as evidenced by Drew (Chloe Fineman) giving praise to her remote audience (or "VFFs – Virtual Friends Forever!"), adulation to interview guests Billy Porter (Kenan Thompson), Nicole Kidman (also Fineman), Reese Witherspoon (Fineman again) and ex-husband Tom Green (Alex Moffat), and especially affection to her show's crew ("they say she maintains eye contact too long and is too emotionally supportive").
- Droolers Anti-Defamation League – Wearing nerdy glasses and a face full of slobber, Chevy Chase promotes this organization that works "to correct the negative image of droolers propagated by the media." Chase's sustained chuckle in this PSA from SNL's third episode is believed to the show's first break of character.
- Dropping the L.B.'s With Missy E – Missy Elliott (Tracy Morgan) pitches a workout video featuring her impossible-to-imitate dance moves.
- Dru Can See Everything — Before Elizabeth Holmes (Jane Wickline) and partner Billy Evans (Ben Marshall) tapped Nathan Fielder to document the weeks leading up to her imprisonment for defrauding her company's investors (the result being the metadocumentary You Can See Everything), they tapped Druski (the episode's host), who agrees despite telling Holmes and Evans "Y’all have got some of the weirdest, freakiest vibe I’ve ever seen." Now, A24 releases Druski's footage, which includes spoofs of the actual film's egg-beating scene and closeup/staredown interviews, as well as Druski donning his signature whiteface drag to get into Holmes' mind (a nod to how Fielder relied on Amanda Seyfried to portray Holmes in his film's reenactments).
- Duncan Hines Brownie Husband – A brownie treat shaped like a life-sized man, designed specifically for the single woman (in this case episode host Tina Fey).
- Dunkin' Donuts – An ad featuring "Actual Customers," all of whom appear professional and telegenic in front of the camera... except for Donny (episode host Casey Affleck), who sports a thick Boston accent and a rude, uncouth disposition toward Dunkin's staff and patrons.
- Duolingo for Talking to Children – Episode host Kristen Stewart uses this instructional app to have meaningful dialogues and other interactions with children.
- Duster's Digest – a magazine focused on the lifestyles of phencyclidine users.
- DynaCorp – Announcer Chris Parnell confuses Jessica Simpson with food products similar to Chicken of the Sea-brand tuna. The ad parodies Simpson's remark on the MTV reality show Newlyweds: Nick and Jessica, where she asked Nick Lachey if Chicken of the Sea was tuna or chicken.
- Dysfunctional Family Christmas – From Silver Bell Records comes this compilation of songs suitable for the holiday season, "when families get together to reopen old feelings." Sing along to such tunes as "I've Got My Drinking Under Control For The Holidays," "Can't You Let It Drop, It's Christmas," and "Let's Pretend We Like Each Other (This Christmas)."
- Dyson Toilet – Parody of Dyson vacuum cleaner ads; here, James Dyson (Fred Armisen) promotes a toilet with a ring that doesn't employ suction to people's rear ends.

== E ==
- E! – "Turn off your brain" with new additions to the cable channel's celebrity-driven reality schedule, including Kendall's Model House and Kendall's World, both featuring Kendall Jenner (episode host Gal Gadot), and I Hate That, with NeNe Leakes (Leslie Jones) offering withering fashion critiques.
- Eager & Jones – Jerome Eager (Chris Farley) and Tad Jones (Tim Meadows), "two of the greatest voices in the world, and two of the straightest guys you'd ever want to meet," sing cover versions of love songs that make them sound gay.
- Earthies – Mom Nan (Julia Sweeney) one-ups rival mother Sarah (Victoria Jackson) with these diapers that can be fertilized to grow into produce (like the corn and pumpkins grown in the ad). The closing tagline: "Protects their bottoms, protects the planet. From Dell Monty."
- eBay – In this Season 46 ad, shoppers Heidi Gardner, Ego Nwodim, and Chris Redd use the e-commerce site to sell things they bought online while isolated during the COVID-19 pandemic but never bothered to use. Also promoted is a "PreBay" option that lets shoppers with second thoughts have their purchase intercepted before delivery.
- The Ed McMahon School of Laughing – For those who like to laugh, and who'd like to make money by doing so, this school trains students in the lucrative world of recording their giggles, guffaws, etc. to laugh tracks for TV sitcoms.
- Einstein Express – an express courier service that handles late-arriving packages by literally sending them back in time to the desired arrival date. The slogan: "When it absolutely, positively has to be there the day before yesterday".
- Elder PSA – This Season 49 ad features senior citizens expressing pain, annoyance, and disgust at being the targets of TikTok pranks by the younger set, such as 78-year-old Irving (James Austin Johnson) wetting himself after being challenged to name a woman, and 70-year-old war veteran Walter (episode host Adam Driver) being asked to watch over a screaming kid at Walmart.
- Elián, The Cuban Boy! – From the people who brought The Lion King and Aida to Broadway comes this new musical about Elián González, a 7-year-old boy who, at the time of this Season 25 promo, was at the center of an immigration and custody battle between the governments of Cuba and the United States. The cast features David Mack Wilson (Rachel Dratch) as Elián, episode host Christopher Walken as Cuban leader Fidel Castro, and a special appearance by U.S. Attorney General Janet Reno (Will Ferrell) as herself.
- El Shrinko – Arthur Perkins (Andy Samberg) and his friend Randy (episode host Jesse Eisenberg) promote "the first scientific pill that can shrink your weiner… because it's TOO BIG!"
- E-Meth – Taking inspiration from the attention that e-cigs have gotten, this ad from late 2013 finds several people (including a cameo from Aaron Paul) happily smoking a cyber version of crystal meth, even though they're aware it's not good for them.
- Empire – This promo parodying the Fox television series that centered on a Black family-owned hip-hop company introduces a new character, a white office manager named Chip (played by episode host Chris Hemsworth) who's naive to the Lyon family drama and just wants to run Empire Entertainment as an everyday business.
- The Englehart Five – The German quintet's new album has Helga Englehart (episode host Eva Longoria) and her brothers Rolf, Fritz, and Juergen (played respectively by Fred Armisen, Bill Hader, and Seth Meyers) singing songs about their brother Klaus' (Will Forte) death in a hunting accident caused by Rolf.
- Enid & Astrid's Brawr Barn – From their lingerie store located at Avenue E and Jill Zarin Blvd, Enid and Astrid (Aidy Bryant and episode host Anya Taylor-Joy) offer such made-in-store bras as "The Fortress" ("goes so high, it's a turtleneck") and "The Load-Bearing Wall" (made with miniature 2x4s), as well as straight-talk recommendations to customers seeking a flattering bra.
- Enter Stage Woof Acting School for Dogs – Yolanda Batista (episode host Ana de Armas) and Donna Colonoscopini (Chloe Fineman) promote their school that trains budding canine thespians, including those who appear uncooperative in this live sketch from Season 48 ("He's a regular Marlon Brandog," they say of one).
- Epoxy-Dent – A 1978 ad for "the strongest denture cream permitted by law". To prove its strength, a user bites down on a wood bar, which is lifted by a helicopter ("The Epoxy-Dent Chopper Test!").
- EPT Home Pregnancy Test – A parody of EPT's campaign that features real-life couples using the product to see if they're having a baby. Here, a man and woman (Seth Meyers and Amy Poehler) await the results of the test – and nervously so, as they're college students who together had a one-night stand two weeks earlier.
- Estro-maxx – This 2011 ad, promoting a once-a-day pill that gives pre-op transgender women all the hormones they need, raised the ire of LGBT media-monitoring group GLAAD, which branded the skit's use of "men with facial hair wearing dresses" as "degrading the lives and experiences of transgender women."
- Eterna-Rest – Casket mattresses that adjust as your loved one's skeletal remains decompose, assuring them a peaceful eternal rest.
- The Evelyn Woodski School of Speed Reading – Shown during the endcap as "The Ev-il-lyn Wood-ski School of Speed Ree-ah-ding...? Redding?", this ad has Woodski (Laraine Newman) explain how her school can help people read words that flash by on TV screens (like the caption "Woodski is a Russian name, honest")... even though she happens to be a pretty bad reader.
- Excedril – Joseph Karen (Will Ferrell) states that "when you've got a headache, scientific mumbo jumbo is the last thing you want to hear". That's why Excedril has zero scientific evidence and, as such, cannot be recommended by doctors for any purpose... unless it's as a birth control drug, as Mary Risinger (Molly Shannon) does ("I'm just glad I found a pain reliever that can kill the tiny babies that live in my husband's sperm.") The tagline: "Skip the science... go straight to relief."
- Excedrin RT – Episode host Queen Latifah plays a businesswoman who takes this pain reliever to combat "racial tension" headaches (the "RT" in the product name) brought on by interns asking questions about the stereotypical behavior of black people.
- Exclusive Connections – Episode host Paris Hilton promotes a sex chat line catering to nerds who are interested in science fiction and fantasy movies.
- Experienced Lawyers – What starts out as a "paid advertisement" from the legal team of Billson & Lieberman (Andrew Dismukes and James Austin Johnson) promoting their "combined 50 years of legal experience" is interrupted, Kool-Aid Man-style ("NOT SO FAST!"), by Lachlan Mulchburger (episode host Amy Poehler) trumpeting his own "75 years" in the legal profession. Mulchburger's then topped by the elderly Drabble Sisters and their own "combined 240 years" of experience. But they're all topped by the "400 years of experience" of "DracuLaw" (Sarah Sherman)... who is then topped by Yggdrasil the Evertree (Bowen Yang), who counts Zeus (Kenan Thompson) as a satisfied client.
- Eych! – "It's the only hairball remover that cats ask for by name." Ellen Cleghorne plays the owner in this spoof of Meow Mix commercials, only here the cats cough in an exceedingly funny manner.
- EZ Date – A parody of eHarmony and other matchmaking websites. All of the matches are alluded to be between prostitute and client.

== F ==
- FX-70 Cheese Slicer – Candice Bergen pitches a Polaroid camera that dispenses cheese slices.
- Farrow & Ball – This ad starts out with Aidy Bryant telling her brother and his wife (Beck Bennett and episode host Kristen Stewart) how she used this premium paint, imported from Great Britain, to make her living room pop with vivid color (or "co-LOOUR" as Bryant pronounces the extra vowel in the word's Oxford English Dictionary spelling). But familial issues are gradually raised, including how Bryant has been spending her share of the family's inheritance (buying paint at $110/gallon), who she's been hooking up with (some shirtless guy she found on Facebook Marketplace), and the parentage of Bennett and Stewart's baby.
- Father of the Bride Part 8 – Framed as a film trailer, this Season 48 sketch finds Annie Banks (Heidi Gardner), "three decades and seven divorces" after the original 1991 film, wanting to get married yet again, despite the financial strains previous nuptials put on father George (episode co-host Steve Martin). But Franck Eggelhoffer (Martin's fellow co-host Martin Short) and Howard Weinstein (Bowen Yang) start planning anyway, with contributions from Annie's little brother Matty (Kieran Culkin in a cameo) and entertainment from Selena Gomez (appearing as herself).
- The Fault in Our Stars 2: The Ebola in Our Everything – A trailer for a sequel to the 2014 film about two teens with cancer who fall in love, only here Olive (episode host Sarah Silverman) has the Ebola virus, which severely tampers paramour Theodore's (Taran Killam) attraction to her.
- Fashion Coward – A clothing store tailored for women with a fragile self-image, offering items (e.g. brown sweaters, gray sweatshirts, no bathing suits) that suggest "the general idea of a person" (e.g. "ideal juror," "goes on cruises with parents"). Store features also help alleviate the trauma of clothes shopping, including faraway mirrors, quick-burning clothes (for those unsure about wearing it), and knock-out gas if a customer spends more than 30 seconds in the dressing room (a big, strong bodyguard will finish the shopping for the unconscious customer).
- Father-Son Podcasting Microphone – A dual microphone that helps fathers bond with their teenage sons as if they're doing a podcast together.
- Fear Factor, Jr. – A season 29 promo for a youth version of the NBC reality show, with Joe Rogan (Fred Armisen) coercing children to perform dangerous and disgusting stunts just as he does with adults on the regular Fear Factor. For example, one kid will have to watch his parents (including an early cameo by Season 30 cast member Rob Riggle) divorce if he can't eat a plate of maggot-ridden eggs Benedict.
- Federline – Kevin Federline (episode host Ashton Kutcher) pitches his new line of underwear to extricate himself from the shadow of his wife Britney Spears; shot in black-and-white, similar in style to early Calvin Klein commercials.
- Felina Cat Food – A parody of onsite supermarket taste-test commercials finds a pitchman duping a housewife into eating tuna casserole made from cat food ("So good, that your cat will be tempted to eat it with a fork!").
- Feline Culinary Creations – This wet cat food "from Pet Chalet" looks like a full gourmet meal on the label... but the actual contents are unsightly piles of meat that make "glop" noises when they hit the plate. A 2011 take on how "gourmet" pet food brands tend to stretch the truth on the packaging.
- A Fiddler Be on the Roof – This 1981 ad depicts Stevie Wonder (Eddie Murphy) starring as Teyve in his take on Fiddler on the Roof, singing Yiddish lyrics in Murphy's now-trademark "old Yiddish man" voice.
- Fido-Flex — First-time episode host Steve Martin promotes "a German Shepherd [wearing digital watch-style displays] that can tell time."
- Firelight – A Season 35 movie trailer spoofing The Twilight Saga, only instead of a vampire, high-schooler Stella Swan (episode host Taylor Swift) falls for a Frankenstein-type monster (Bill Hader).
- First CityWide Change Bank – Two ads promote a financial institution whose only service is providing change (e.g. "you come to us with 16 quarters, 8 dimes, and 4 nickels, we can give you a 5 dollar bill"). How does First CityWide make money doing this? As one service rep says it, "The answer is simple: Volume."
- Flaritin – "The fake Claritin for fake allergies"
- Flenderson's – When gifting a new car to your spouse, don't forget to top it off with one of this company's gigantic red gift bows (they'll be underwhelmed if you don't).
- Flex – Deodorant laced with steroids that provokes its users (Will Ferrell, Chris Kattan, and Tim Meadows) to behave like animals ("they give you that extra edge"). As the jingle puts it: "The laws don't apply to you when you use Flex!"
- Food Dudes – For lonely men who fear being unfavorably judged when ordering too much food, this trio of animatronic mannequins serve as the "friends" who hang out and share the pizza, chicken wings, etc.
- Forever 31 – For women who aren't in their 20s anymore, this retailer offers large purses, sensible flats, loose-fitting big suits, and other fashions in "every color of the bummer rainbow" (from beige to navy blue).
- Fresh Squeezed Baseball – Episode host Bob Uecker starts his day off right with juice freshly pureed (seams and all) from baseballs.
- Fried Chicken's Lonely Hearts Club Band (née Fried Chicken Fields Forever) – VH1 follows up its 2000 film Two of Us, which dramatized an alleged 1976 meetup of former Beatle bandmates John Lennon and Paul McCartney, with another work of speculation: John and Paul (Jimmy Fallon and episode host Alan Cumming respectively) put their differences aside and give the world what they've long wanted – a fast-food restaurant that serves reasonably-priced fried chicken meals.
- Froonga – A party game spoof of Jenga involving wine glasses. At the end, other equally dangerous toys are pitched, including Knife Ball ("Try and catch it!"), Flame Hats ("Hey, your head's on fire.") and Volty, the Electric Tub Duck.
- Frozen II – Disney's DVD of the sequel to Frozen includes deleted storylines with shoehorned diversity, from Elsa (Kate McKinnon) coming out as a lesbian to a Black member of the palace guard (Kenan Thompson).
- Frozen Mexican Dinner – Musician Paul Brittain is not feeling well during his band's recording session, claiming constipation. Luckily, bandmate Fred Armisen offers this frozen food product with medicine designed to counter constipation ("you eat it, and ay ay ay!"). Also available in Indian and fish varieties.
- The Fruiting – What starts as a fruit ad starring Phil Hartman and Nora Dunn reveals itself to be a trailer for a horror flick where citrus fruits attack a family living in a haunted mansion. While it's mostly supposed to lampoon ads that change course midway (think the Energizer Bunny), the credits listed on the bottom of the screen at the end have some pretty so-lame-they're-funny puns ("special guest appearance by Jack Lemmon... music by Tangerine Dream... written by Max Apple").
- Fugliana – An average-looking sex doll for below-average-looking men.

== G ==
- G.O.B. Tampons – Vanessa Bayer promotes "the one brand of tampon created by the people who know women's bodies best: the gentlemen of the Republican Party."
- The Game of Life: DACA Edition – From April 2018, this topical variation on the classic board game forces players who pull a "dreamer" card to take an alternative path where they must "work three jobs," dodge ICE agents, and face bureaucratic hoops. The simulation of, and references to, real life clearly drains one player's (Melissa Villaseñor) enjoyment in the game.
- Gandhi and the Bandit – A movie trailer spoofing Smokey and the Bandit, with law enforcement chasing a speeding 18-wheeler driven by Mahatma Gandhi (Tim Kazurinsky).
- Gangsta Bitch Barbie – A parody of the use of Hip-hop culture in advertisements promotes a new Barbie doll "from Mottel" that perpetuates stereotypes of black people living in the ghetto. The doll comes with Jolly Ranchers, a pack of Newports, and a restraining order against her boyfriend, Tupac Ken.
- Galactic Prophylactic – Excited pitchman Eddie Murphy promotes Ron Popeil-produced male prophylactics constructed with a steel core for extra durability. Also promoted is the Dura-Fram Diaphragm for women.
- Gap – The clothing retailer, its celebrity-driven "This is Easy" campaign, and the Clinton–Lewinsky scandal are parodied in a trio of ads from the 24th season premiere that feature three notable figures in the scandal rocking out while casually dressed:
  - President Bill Clinton (Darrell Hammond) on sax ("This is so easy! It's just… it's easy!")
  - First Lady Hillary Clinton (Ana Gasteyer) angrily thrashing on electric guitar ("This is not easy!")
  - Independent counsel Ken Starr (Chris Parnell) on reams of papers and a boombox ("The American people have a right to know!")
- Gary Busey Motorcycle Helmet – Following his near-fatal motorcycle crash (in which he wasn't wearing a helmet), this clip features Gary Busey (Phil Hartman) endorsing a new line of protective headgear. The helmet is topped with an enormous foam rubber "helmet protector" (with a "helmet protector protector" also mentioned but too large to be shown).
- Gary Hart for President Committee – This sensually-shot ad finds a scorned woman (Jan Hooks) fighting in vain to put Gary Hart behind her, but Hart is there to remind her (and voters) that "you can't get him out of your mind," no matter what he may have done (an allusion to the allegations of extramarital affairs that plagued the charismatic Hart's campaign for U.S. president in the late 1980s).
- Gas Right – Inventor Bruce Johnson (Fred Armisen) modifies his Breathe-Right nasal strips to a larger size that expands the buttocks and prevents nighttime flatulence noises.
- Gaystrogen – A parody of the Estroven hormone drug; for men over 45 suffering from "queer loss". The effectiveness of the pill is demonstrated by a gray CGI model of a male body suddenly dancing as it turns rainbow-colored.
- GE Big Boy Appliances – In contrast to the 1950s, women are now considered the prize-winners of the house who go out and work while the men are more likely to stay home and care for the family. But stay-at-home husbands (like episode host Jason Momoa) can still keep the house clean with such appliances as a dishwasher with a 70-pound steel door, a washing machine 6 feet in height, and a 240-horsepower riding lawnmower-like vacuum cleaner with a stain remover that looks and acts like a jackhammer.
- GEICO – "Eric Butler (Andy Samberg) is a real GEICO customer, not a celebrity," so Whitney Houston (Maya Rudolph) is called on to help tell his accident claim story in this parody of the insurance company's celebrities-and-customers campaign from the mid-2000s.
- General Dynamics – The technology company's leadership in "laser-guided technology" is featured only at the end of this ad that features a guy and a girl wondering if they should go out on a date.
- Geritech – "If you think I'm embarrassed endorsing the Geritech line of products, you just don't know me." So says straight-faced episode host Leslie Nielsen at the end of this ad where endorses:
  - Blotch-Off, the liver spot remover that "works while you sleep."
  - Dripmaster, an undergarment for those with bladder control problems ("In fact, I'm relieving myself [brief pause] right now!").
  - Bung-King, "the only hemmorhoidal cream and suppository with my face on it."
  - Solidex, the diarrhea relief formula that's "always in my medicine cabinet, and in my make-up kit."
- Gidget Goes to Shock Therapy – This PSA features three grown women acting like little girls, the result of "Gidget's Disease," a condition psychiatrist Jane Curtin says makes them "terminally cute… too cute for their own good." The only cure is a form of "pointless root canal" in "The Dental Theater of Cruelty."
- Gillette – Various celebrities use Gillette's Fusion ProGlide Styler, including Adrien Brody (Taran Killam), Gael García Bernal (Fred Armisen), and André 3000 (Jay Pharaoh), to trim their beards and make them look like a million bucks. So does Jerry Sandusky (Jason Sudeikis), who, since every news network wants a piece of him after the Penn State child sex abuse scandal, wants to look camera-ready during footage of him confessing to the crime.
- Girls – From Season 39, this promo for the HBO comedy finds Hannah, Marnie, Jessa, and Shoshanna welcoming someone new to their circle of friendship – Blerta (episode host Tina Fey), an impoverished Albanian immigrant who doesn't entirely sympathize with the girls' issues.
- Girls Gone Wild: Katrina – Doug Stanhope (Jason Sudeikis) travels to a flooded post-Hurricane Katrina New Orleans and offers women fresh water and clothing in exchange for their flashing their breasts and "going wild" for the camera.
- Giuliani & Associates – Timely yet cut for time from an October 2019 episode, this ad finds Donald Trump's personal attorney, Rudolph Giuliani (Kate McKinnon), promoting his services for those in serious legal trouble — for serious crimes they committed — and promising to make things worse. Appearing in testimonials are two clients with suspicious accents yet claiming to be American citizens; "Yankees legend" Bernie Williams (Kenan Thompson), who bails from his endorsement after sensing something's up; and Giuliani associates Lev Parnas and Igor Fruman (Beck Bennett and episode host David Harbour, respectively), who, after their arrests that week, surfaced as notable figures in the Trump–Ukraine scandal.
- Give Us All Our Daughters Back – In this Season 38 film trailer, a kidnapping incident at a CIA daycare center forces several action film stars to assemble… and do nothing more than spend half the film making threatening phone calls and the other half shooting the breeze.
- Gladiator Twosical – Gladiator II made over $300 million worldwide by the time of this December 2024 trailer… but after seeing the tune-filled Moana 2 and Wicked best that box office figure, an extra 50 minutes of musical numbers is added to the still-violent film, including Macrinus (Kenan Thompson) leading a rendition of "There's No Place Like Rome" and a Lin-Manuel Miranda-penned battle rap between an emperor (Mikey Day) and Lucius (episode host Paul Mescal reprising his film role).
- Glamgina – Makeup for the vaginal area, as cheerfully promoted by Sarah Sherman and other SNL female cast members, much to the chagrin of Sherman's gynecologist (episode host Pete Davidson).
- Glitter Litter Automatic Litter Factory – Host Matt Damon appears in this ad cut-for-time from his 2018 stint for a cat litter box that turns his cat Fluffy's droppings into stunning gold and silver jewelry.
- Golden Needles – There's no need to make visits to the doctor or undergo surgery, not when there's this "amazing new scientific breakthrough" pairing Chinese acupuncture with Haitian Vodou."
- Gone Without a Trace – A promo for a Netflix documentary chronicling the plights of three men (Ben Marshall, Kenan Thompson, and episode host Miles Teller) dealing with the sudden disappearances of their wives… who, in actuality, just took a business trip, spent the weekend visiting their sister, or simply went to the bathroom (and told their husbands as such).
- Googie Rene's – In two ads, Googie (Kenan Thompson) promotes his seasonal discount clothing shops where you can save big on clothes with obvious imperfections including:
  - Googie Rene's Partially Damaged Halloween Costume Discount Basement, whose costumes are so stained and torn you need props to hide the imperfections (and everything carries suspicious odors).
  - Googie Rene's Slightly Damaged Prom Wear Barn, featuring dresses with grass stains on the backside and tuxedos with meatball stains on the front (the previous wearer fell asleep in a plate of spaghetti).
- The Goombahs – Cashing in on the success of HBO's The Sopranos, Showtime creates its own show about a commonplace Italian-American family. The promo's tagline: "Television at its finest… and its most Italian."
- GoProbe – A trio of extreme athletes (Taran Killam, Kyle Mooney, and Beck Bennett) promote this special version of the GoPro camera designed for use by doctors in colonoscopy exams.
- Gossip Girl: Staten Island – "For those who like the intrigue of Gossip Girl but hate the sophistication of Manhattan," The CW promotes this offshoot centered around the salacious exploits of Chandelier Martini (episode host, and Gossip Girl castmember, Blake Lively) and other heavily accented denizens of Staten Island.
- Go-Techs Flex with ThumbPulse – An (intentionally) amateurish infomercial spoof promoting a home exercise machine with fingertip pulse monitors that make it hard to operate the device in the first place. Episode host Channing Tatum is the feather-haired pitchman pushing bubbly Winona (Kristin Wiig) to the max, despite her getting tangled in the monitor wires.
- GP Yass – Liven up your long trip by adding this mode to your GPS navigation device that uses a drag performer's voice and attitude (notably those of Jiggly Caliente and Peppermint) to tell you which route you need to take.
- Grable and Lombard – A movie trailer spoof about the lesbian wedding of Betty Grable and Carole Lombard.
- Grady Wilson DVDs – Sanford and Son character Grady Wilson (Kenan Thompson) promotes two DVDs that teach married couples his best sexual moves, all bizarre yet humorously demonstrated by Grady and his assistants in what appears to be his garage. The DVDs include:
  - Grady Wilson's Burning Up the Sheets, in which Grady and Amber (episode host Megan Fox) perform moves such as "The Striking 12" and "The Skydiver."
  - Grady Wilson's Fifty & Freaky, with Grady and "Marta from Amsterdam" (episode host Sigourney Weaver) demonstrating "The Sun Is In My Eyes," "The Old TV" ("Any picture yet?"), and other techniques for couples over 50.
- Graffiti: Say No – New York City mayor Rudolph Giuliani cracks down on graffiti artists defacing the city by adding "sucks" next to their handiwork. For two-timers, a special section of the police will make it look like the "sucks" insult was written by the person targeted; three-timers will have it read "sucks big time".
- Grandkids in the Movies – Old people work around boredom from seeing then-newer movies like Juno and No Country for Old Men by watching this special DVD that inserts their grandkids (Andy Samberg and Bill Hader) into the flicks.
- Grayson Moorhead Securities – Four ads, ten years apart, lampoon the tradition of competence and trustworthiness that brokerage companies commonly display.
  - The first two, from 1995, feature vintage film of founder Arthur Grayson (Jim Downey) dictating his company's "basic principles," including keeping a list of clients in a safe, secure place; projecting an air of listening to clients (even if they're not paying attention to them); and investing only in white-owned business ("Not all of Arthur Grayson's principles are followed today," a voiceover advises).
  - The second pair, from 2005, feature a present-day Grayson talking about his company's knack for investing in companies that either go bankrupt or are revealed to be unscrupulous (the tagline: "Losing our clients' money with dignity and pride since 1926").
- Green & Fazio – Attorney Barry Green (Phil Hartman) and his firm specialize in personal injury cases including phantom whiplash, near-collision stress, trauma suffered by accident bystanders, and pain suffered while committing burglary, not to mention harassing defendants to settle.
- Grey Adult Pigtails – "The number one hairstyle for adults of a certain age" (i.e. those of the older, hippie generation). "Find them at any natural health food store."
- Grimaldi's Classic Creations – Nativity scene figurines including a Baby Jesus that, thanks to a sound microchip, screams 24 hours a day from Christmas Day to Three Kings Day (December 25 – January 6), much to the consternation of mom Nancy Walls, dad David Koechner, and the family.
- Grouch – From DC Films and "the twisted minds at Sesame Workshop" comes this Joker-like origin story, directed by Todd Phillips and "brought to you by the letter 'R'," about how grouchy sanitation worker Oscar (episode host David Harbour) came to reside in a trash can on Sesame Street. But the October 2019 trailer shows that it's not the sunny place from TV, as the street's memorable characters (Big Bird, The Count, Cookie Monster, Mr. Snuffleupagus, Prairie Dawn, and Elmo) are depicted as sex workers, drug addicts, homeless beggars, or criminals. Oscar doesn't appear to mind, however, reasoning to a social worker that "If everyone calls you trash, and everyone treats you like trash, why don't you just become trash?"
- Gublin & Green – Attorney Frank Gublin (Fred Armisen) specializes in physical and psychological injuries suffered by those performing in or attending Spider-Man: Turn Off the Dark, though the emoluments clients receive isn't monetary (show merchandise, tickets to future performances). A February 2011 parody of personal injury lawyer ads and the notoriously troubled Broadway musical.
- Gun City – A Crazy Eddie-type pitchman (Joe Piscopo) offers firearms as Christmas presents.
- Guns – A public service announcement showing how much firearms are a part of American life, whether you're proposing to your fiancée, needing protection while jogging alone in the woods, welcoming a baby into the world, or bonding with an older relative. The tagline: "Guns. We're here to stay."
- Guns for Women — As a group of women lament their husbands' fascination with firearms ("Men and their guns…"), one in the group (episode host Dakota Johnson) reveals she's bought a pistol (available at "The Opposite of Dick's Sporting Goods") that's pink, is in the shape of a (blurred-out) vagina, and goes "Hey!" when fired.
- Guy Fieri's Full Throttle Christmas Special – Food Network host Fieri (Bobby Moynihan) presents a holiday special with his unique dishes and featuring appearances from "the human equivalent of the food he makes," like Kid Rock (Brooks Wheelan), Criss Angel (Kyle Mooney), Bret Michaels (Taran Killam), Kimbo Slice (Kenan Thompson), Mimi from The Drew Carey Show (Aidy Bryant), Verne Troyer (John Milhiser), Big Ang (Kate McKinnon), Dog the Bounty Hunter (John Goodman), the Duck Dynasty guys (musical guest Kings of Leon), and the cast of Pawn Stars (all played by Moynihan).

== H ==
- H&M − Episode host John Goodman complains to an H&M clerk (Taran Killam) that he only has $60 to buy six shirts and four pairs of pants. The clerk explains that he's in luck, because "that's what you do at H&M". The ad then launches into a rap performed by Jay Pharaoh and Wale about the low prices you can purchase clothes for at H&M ("You an H&M shoppin'-ass ninja!")
- Half Jewish Half Italian Completely Neurotic − Tommy Palmese (Fred Armisen) cancels Hugh Jackman: Back on Broadway early so he can take center stage in this one-man show of his in which he fails to tell his life story (one newspaper quote says, "The whole thing just stressed me out from beginning to end."). "Most shows are $5. And then there's beer and wine."
- Hallmark Channel Countdown to Christmas – the network's nearly round-the-clock block of "heartwarming holiday films for the whole family" has been parodied on two occasions:
  - The first ad, airing in December 2013, spotlights big-time stars in such films as:
    - Skyping with Santa, starring Rosie O'Donnell ("If Santa isn't real, then who's been poking Mrs. Mills on Facebook?")
    - My Neighbor's a Magi, in which a "young, single mom" finds frankincense in her yard (thanks to a neighbor played by Dean Cain)
    - "The kid from Modern Family" starring in Scrooge Jr. ("Your whole family will be saying 'Bah, humbug, Dude!'")
    - Phylicia Rashad's Christmas Nap (it's what happens after a big holiday feast)
    - Yes, Virginia, There Is a Santana, in which Carlos Santana charms "a little girl who's lost her faith in guitar solos"
    - Dolly Parton in Elf with a Shelf ("Santa goes 'hubba, hubba'")
    - On Dasher, On Danza, in which Tony Danza must step in as Santa's "Plan B" after Rudolph gets sick
  - The second ad, cut for time from a December 2017 episode, details three noteworthy tropes found in Hallmark's holiday films: Frequently-used actors in Canadian locations performing similar storylines ("It's quantity over quality, people"). Three films are promoted here:
    - Yes, Santa! starring Jessica Normal (Kate McKinnon) as a big-city businesswoman who, after moving back home to run her grandmother's Christmas tree farm, is wooed by an old classmate, who is really a young Santa Claus played by "Canadian handsome" actor Chris Bearstick (episode host James Franco)
    - Christmas Kitchen Wish, in which a baker and single mom (Heidi Gardner) finds herself magically trapped inside a snowglobe and requesting extraction assistance from her "black co-worker with no backstory" (Kenan Thompson)
    - Prince Santa, with "once-famous, now very Christian actress" Meredith Devoe-Ellis (Melissa Villaseñor) portraying a figure skater who, after getting amnesia, falls for her kingdom's handsome prince – played by Chris Bearstick, because Hallmark Channel got him to do "two of these for no pay"
- Hallmark Mother Collection – Mother's Day cards that "crazy weirdo" sons who enjoy dressing up and acting like their mothers can give themselves ("because you're not just a good son, you're also a wonderful mother").
- Hamburger Helper Antibacterial – Chris Parnell pitches this food item that includes the "powerful antibacterial agent" Tristanex to a grocery-shopping couple (Will Ferrell and Ana Gasteyer) unsure if the days-old hamburger meat in their refrigerator is safe to eat. Parnell's cooking demonstration reveals, despite the product's acrid smell, that the meat's "germ volume is almost cut in half" (by 37.99% to be precise). Also promoted is Chicken Helper with Chlorine Bleach.
- Hamm & Bublé – Episode host Jon Hamm and musical guest Michael Bublé (or "bubbly" as Hamm intentionally misprounces it) invite you to their high-class restaurant that specializes in pork dishes, sparkling champagne, and live entertainment by a visibly nervous Bublé… who, as it turns out, was kidnapped by Hamm.
- Handi-Off – Businesswoman Sheila (Victoria Jackson) trusts this topical medication that removes excess fingers. "Also try new Toe-Riffic!"
- Handmaids in the City – Margaret Atwood teams with Sex and the City's executive producer for this Handmaid's Tale spinoff that turns the dystopian life of a Handmaids quartet into breezy, bawdy romantic comedy. As the ad's voiceover notes, "You'll laugh; you'll cry; you'll say, 'Oh, this so could be me and my friends… you know, with the way things are going.'"
- Hands-Free Selfie Stick – A traditional selfie stick needs to be held with one hand. Not this version, whose long, a bendable arm reaches out over the user and is inserted (inconveniently) up their buttocks. Episode host Amy Schumer ("It takes pictures?") makes an endorsement cameo.
- Happy Fun Ball – A seemingly simple children's toy with dozens of disclaimers for absurdly dangerous health hazards and life-threatening properties, notably among them "Do not taunt Happy Fun Ball."
- Happy's – Proprietor Happy (Eddie Murphy) pitches his fast-food restaurant that only serves mayonnaise.
- Harlan Kane – The Abacus Conundrum is the latest book in Kane's (episode host Robert De Niro) very Langdonesque series, with titles that start out straightforward ("The Medici Codex", "The Perseus Enigma", "The Genghis Rubicon") before turning downright off-the-wall as the sketch progresses ("The Pokémon Directive", "The Vespucci Containment", "The Fuddruckers Ultimatum").
- Harley's Bristol Cream – A parody of Harvey's Bristol Cream, in which Gilda Radner uses the phone to find dates and then calls out to people on the street by opening the window.
- Harry for Him – Episode host Harry Styles partners with Target "and the men's section of Claire's" to recreate his extraordinary red carpet & in-concert fashions for ordinary men.
- Harvey Epstein for City Council – Episode host John Mulaney portrays the New York State Assemblyman in this November 2024 campaign ad, insisting he's "a different guy" from the two notorious sex offenders he shares names with ("'Harvey' I could almost handle, but 'Epstein'—that thing is an albatross").
- Have a Nice Day – A trailer for a horror film where smiley faces haunt potential murder victims.
- HBO – With the mega-popular Game of Thrones about to enter its final season, this GoT pun-laden ad for the network promotes "prequels, sequels, and spinoffs," among them the Daria-inspired animated show Arya; Samwell Tarly and Gilly in the sitcom The King of Queens Landing; and the crossover Game of Thrones: Special Victims Unit ("created by Dire Wolf"), with Benson and Tutuola (Mariska Hargitay and Ice-T, in costumed cameos) investigating a gruesome murder in Westeros.
- Headz Up – An app that clues people into their surroundings and keeps them out of danger (e.g. "A truck is coming," "Your wife is speaking") while their eyes are glued to their mobile device.
- Heated Wizardry – HBO turns Harry Potter into Heated Rivalry by pairing quidditch teammates Harry (episode host Finn Wolfhard) and Ron Weasley (Ben Marshall) as romantic partners. The promo features a cameo by Jason Momoa as Hagrid and pull quotes from "HornyMuggles.net" ("Finally, finally, yes!") and Potter author J. K. Rowling ("I am not a part of this").
- Hedley and Wyche – An ad for "the British toothpaste" that's infused with "two teaspoons of pure cane sugar… for a smile that says, 'Yum, that was good.'" A spoof of the stereotype that the Brits, by and large, maintain poor dental hygiene.
- Heinz Relax – Near-empty bottles of ketchup, mayonnaise, and mustard tend to make flatulent noises, leaving the user (in this ad, episode host Will Ferrell) embarrassed and the butt of familial jokes at the Thanksgiving dinner table. But these redesigned bottles, when used, make a relaxing sigh… and other noises associated with sexual intercourse ("Must be 18 or over to buy").
- Helmsley Spook House – Leona Helmsley (played by Nora Dunn) creates a haunted house with the same style, class, and obedient workers as her hotels.
- HelpFund – In this Season 40 parody of tender, pathological international aid advertisements (think Save the Children), Charles Daniels (episode host Bill Hader) visits a poverty-stricken African village and gently tells viewers that for the daily cost of just 39 cents (this ad's title, and a price equivalent to a small cup of coffee), villagers can receive the food, water, and medicine they sorely lack. However, the villagers (portrayed by Jay Pharoah, Kenan Thompson, Sasheer Zamata, and then-SNL writer Leslie Jones) take offense over the insultingly low amount. Daniels gives them increasingly weak defenses for a figure that "has been decided by very educated and caring people who can save your lives," until he finally admits he does not even know what country he's actually in ("Africa?"). The ad ends with Jones' character demanding viewers send $200 "if you wanna see this cheap-ass white man again."
- Herbal Essences for Men – Attorney Amy Poehler has already "got the urge," but opposing counsel Will Ferrell and other men in the courtroom get it too in this parody of Clairol's shampoo line and its playfully sensual ad campaign.
- Herman & Sons Sperm Bank – George Herman (episode host Seth Rogen) and Eugene Sons (Kenan Thompson) announce a going-out-of-the-business sale at "the oldest sperm bank in greater Lansing;" they're turning the space into a TCBY franchise, so they need to get rid of their sperm stock to assure "minimal sperm-to-yogurt crossover."
- Heroin AM – An over-the-counter form of heroin for those who want to take the drug yet remain productive parents, workers, etc. Though panned for painting the Opioid epidemic in the United States in a humorous tone, the 2016 ad was also lauded for highlighting the issue in the first place, including the drug's dangerous risks ("Side effects include… it's heroin, so all that stuff") and its impact on people from all walks of life.
- Herpastopper – Less a promotion for this herpes medication and more a parody of prescription ads in general, this Season 50 spoof advises that if you find yourself doing any enjoyable activities in slow motion (e.g. rock climbing, kayaking, dancing to an indie rock band in a small setting), it's a sign that you should get tested for herpes.
- Hey, You! – Gilda Radner appears in this ad for a perfume for women in search of a one-night stand.
- HiberNol – "From the makers of ComaDose" comes this NyQuil-like cold medicine that knocks a person out for the entire cold and flu season. A Season 18 ad featuring Chris Farley, Julia Sweeney, and pitchman Phil Hartman ("You can't buy stronger medication… in this country").
- Hillary Clinton – Wanting to lure some of the younger voters attracted to Bernie Sanders during the 2016 Democratic primaries, Clinton (Kate McKinnon) starts taking some of the same campaign stands, so much to the point that she slowly begins to mimic the Brooklyn-accented Vermont Senator ("I'm whoever you want me to be, and I approve this message. I'm trying, you guys.").
- Hire The Incompetent – "Why should someone who is already good at their job win out over someone who is poor at theirs?" So says episode host Charles Grodin in this Season 3 PSA that offers testimonials from unskilled workers, among them Roseanne Roseannadanna (Gilda Radner's first performance of the recurring character).
- The Hobbit sequels – Director Peter Jackson stretches the film trilogy into a 19-part series, all filmed in "S#!T-Vision" and featuring such filler material as delaying a march to Smaug's lair (because something was left behind at The Shire); Gandalf trying to remember a name; splitting a dinner bill; and "The Elf Queen" (episode host Jennifer Lawrence) deciding on what outfit to wear.
- Holding Your Own B--bs Magazine – Episode host Sarah Michelle Gellar is topless in this ad promoting a magazine exclusively dedicated to photos of male and female celebrities cupping their breasts. The ad spoofs the numerous copycat magazine covers that re-created Janet Jackson's famous 1993 Rolling Stone cover.
- Home Security Decoy – Mannequins posing as criminals already breaking into a house to trick real thieves into thinking it's already being robbed.
- Homocil – a special drug that helps reduce the stress of parents whose male children express homosexual tendencies. The tag line: "Because it's your problem, not theirs."
- Hoops – Gino's girlfriend (episode host Jennifer Lopez) and her cousin (Melissa Villaseñor) promote a store where they sell customized, 100%-metal hoop earrings ("So luxurious, they'll turn your ears the color of money").
- Horizon System 12 – After Zenith introduces its System 3 line of television sets, Horizon Corporation tops it with "a masterpiece" of a set that produces high-performance sound and pictures… but is revealed at the end to be a gigantic console with massive speakers and a relatively minuscule picture tube.
- Hormuz Jeff – Unable to send shipments through the Strait of Hormuz due to its war-related closure? Just contact, through the "Text-O" messenger app, "Hormuz Jeff" (episode host Will Ferrell), who with his 22-foot pontoon ("The Hormuz Hornet") will ship anything (except animals) through the dangerous strait. An ad cut-for-time from the Season 51 finale.
- Horny Little Dork – A cut-for-time movie trailer from Season 49 depicts the horror women encounter when their husbands become aroused upon seeing them step out of the shower, working out, or showing just a little bit of skin – sexually dorky behavior that, Bowen Yang's genealogist character determines, has affected married men for millennia.
- Horse Play Soundtrack – From Season 36, the soundtrack to an upcoming animated film about horses who play baseball features "totally original" songs from Randy Newman (Fred Armisen) ("Horse people got no reason to live"), Alanis Morissette (episode host Anne Hathaway) ("And I'm here to remind you that your head got struck by a knuckleball"), and The Cranberries (Kristen Wiig plays Dolores O'Riordan) ("I-eeaeat's a home ruu-uun, horse home ruu-uu-uu-auuuun")).
- Hotel-Motel Art Fair – Tom Clay (Harry Shearer) pitches art events that sell paintings that once hung in various hotel and motel rooms.
- Hot Girl Hospital – A promo for a new medical drama "from Shonda Rimes and the top commenters on The Shade Room's Instagram" that features three hospital staffers (Punkie Johnson, Ego Nwodim, and episode host Megan Thee Stallion) who, when lives are on the line, "will answer the call, say something rude, and hang up." Critiques one reviewer from Variety, "I didn't feel comfortable reviewing this as a white guy. Five stars."
- Hot Sauce Carry Purse by Tabasco – In case the party you're attending doesn't have any hot sauce at the buffet table, bring your own sauce in this purse ("available at Wilsons Leather") that's "insulated and calibrated to keep your [various] sauces organized and fresh."
- House of Carters – E!'s newest reality show makes a big deal out of the brotherly antics that Nick & Aaron Carter (Jason Sudeikis) and Andy Samberg respectively) frequently partake in (constantly bickering about unimportant matters, fighting over the TV remote, playing rock paper scissors).
- Hoverboards – This December 2015 ad parodies the popularity of self-balancing scooters and their propensity to catch fire (it's the gift that says "I hate walking, but I love fires").
- How to Order Sushi Like a CEO – A pompous executive (episode host Matt Dillon) promotes his book (that he hired someone else to write) on how to order at sushi restaurants, all the while patronizing sushi restaurant waitress Maya Rudolph ("Anything else, Mr. Douche?").
- HuckaPM – How does White House Press Secretary Sarah Huckabee Sanders (Aidy Bryant), sleep at night after a long day of making outlandish statements in defense of the Trump administration? With this sleep aid that combines Melatonin, extra strength quaaludes, and the "One and Dones" prescribed to Michael Jackson by his doctor. One tablet puts Sanders instantly to sleep.
- Hudsacillin – Booked to appear on The Jennifer Hudson Show but anxious about dancing through its "spirit tunnel"? This medication, endorsed by episode host and "uncoordinated white woman" Nikki Glaser, doesn't cure your apprehension, but rather makes you so violently ill that you have to cancel your guest spot.
- Huggies Thong – useless diapers shaped like thongs; parodies the increasing phenomenon of the sexualization of young children, and parents who allow their children to dress in risqué, revealing clothing more suited for adults.
- The Hunting Wives – Netflix teases Season 2 of "the straight-but-lesbian, horny-Republican murder drama" with this promo featuring episode host Amy Poehler in the role of Margo Banks and her Parks & Recreation co-star Aubrey Plaza as "a new new girl" in the titular clique.

== I ==
- I Did It in My Style: The Story of Frank Sinatra – From the Danish Repertory Theatre comes this musical depicting Sinatra's life story featuring Aki Hanenrud (Fred Armisen) as Sinatra, lazy rewrites of Sinatra's songs (since rights to Ol' Blue Eyes' song catalog couldn't be obtained), and an inaccurate tale of the famed singer's story ("Don't they have Google in Denmark?" rants Newsday).
- I Gotta Eat, Too – Tito Jackson (Tracy Morgan), the bassist for The Jackson 5, opens this ad by calmly stating "I know what you're thinking: 'He's just another jealous, disgruntled older brother who wants some of his younger brother's money.'" After a beat, he confirms "You damn right!" and shills a series of basslines he recorded for famous songs. Also promoted is I Told Ya I Need to Eat, Fool, a video of him demonstrating dance moves he stole from Michael (a video is shown of him dancing to "Thriller", until an EMT played by Jim Breuer sits him down). "What y'all waitin' for? I gotta eat too!"
- I Know Why The Caged Bird Laughs – A promo for a new Punk'd-esque TV show featuring Maya Angelou (played by Maya Rudolph) pulling pranks on her circle of celebrity friends; the pranks include putting a pie on Morgan Freeman's (Jay Pharoah) chair, taking the bottom out of Dr. Cornel West's (Kenan Thompson) suitcase, and interrupting Stephen King's (Bill Hader) book signing to tell him that his car has been towed.
- I Was a Bridesmaid – A trailer for a Netflix true-crime documentary about the cult-like horrors of being a wedding bridesmaid.
- I Was Not a Sucker for Saturday Night – Laraine Newman (as her recurring character Sherry) pitches a book about her risqué encounters with the male writers of Saturday Night Live.
- Infiniti Toilets – Jonathan Pryce (Mike Myers) hawks Infiniti's new toilet line in the same way he does for their J30 ("Everything you ever wanted in a toilet.").
- In His Own Words: The Original Songs of Michael Bolton – Bolton (Kevin Nealon) promotes his new album of "totally original" songs that are little more than just pre-existing songs with a few minor tweaks (for instance, "I Heard It Through The Bushes").
- Interbank – A husband and wife (Will Ferrell and Molly Shannon) extol the aforementioned bank that sends black ops to find your stolen traveler's checks.
- iPhone – Fred Armisen plays a man who uses his iPhone to keep his relationship with his pregnant wife separate from his affair with a French-Canadian woman whom he loves more. (In the NBC rebroadcasts, this was replaced with another iPhone ad, this time with Jason Sudeikis as a man who uses his iPhone to elude the police.)
- ISIS – A controversial Season 40 parody of a Toyota Camry ad that featured a proud father driving his daughter to the airport, where she departs for U.S. Army training. Here, however, the daughter (episode host Dakota Johnson) is being picked up not by an Army representative but by Islamic State militants, as her father (Taran Killam) looks on with apprehension. The ad was both blasted for mining comedy out of ISIS' atrocious actions and applauded for daring to ridicule the terrorist group.
- i-sleepPRO – This ambient sleep aid that has settings for "white noise" and "black noise"; the latter includes thumping bass music, dialogue from Tyler Perry sitcoms and the movie Friday, domestic arguments, and an old woman complaining about her foot pain. Jay Pharoah provides voice work for the device.
- It Gets Better Project – A decade after its founding, the nonprofit organization providing positive advice to LGBT youth calls on four previous recipients (played by Punkie Johnson, Kate Mckinnon, Bowen Yang, and episode host Dan Levy, all openly LGBT-identifying in real life) to advise the youth of today that it will indeed get better for them… but that they'll encounter the same types of problems (e.g. income taxes, annoying family members, criticism over musical tastes, kids' pet iguanas) that Levy's character notes were "previously only available to straight people… and that is progress."

== J ==
- J.J. Casuals – Jack Johnson (Andy Samberg) promotes shoes shaped like bare feet for those who are as casual as he is.
- Jack Flatts – The fast casual restaurant chain talks of its adjustment to providing curbside delivery due to COVID-related restrictions against indoor serving ("We know how much you miss coming in"). But 27 seconds into the ad, the transmission is interrupted by thrash metal music and what appears to be a group of militia members demanding that the state reopen Jack Flatts and lift mask-wearing mandates; if their demands aren't met… [low voice] "We're gonna kidnap the governor."
- Jake's Non-Stick Underwear for Men – Made from the same durable ceramic coating found in cookware, this prescription-only underwear is built for men who want their undergarments as rough and tough as they are, and who'd rather not go through the embarrassment of double bagging and disposing of their old, soiled-beyond-salvation underwear.
- The JaMarcus Brothers: Now Is the Time for a Tickle Fight, He He! – An ad for a CD featuring slow jam songs from the JaMarcus Brothers: Marcus (Kenan Thompson), Darnell (Jay Pharoah) and "adopted white virgin" Englebert (episode host Christoph Waltz).
- Jamitol – A parody of Geritol in which a husband (Chevy Chase) extols the virtues of the multivitamin that has kept his wife (Michael O'Donoghue) working to the point of exhaustion. "My wife. I think I'll stuff her!"
- Jam Hawkers – Carrying the Smucker's slogan ("With a name like Smucker's, it has to be good!") to absurd extremes, this Season 1 skit finds SNL cast members outdoing each other in endorsing, in the following order, fruit preserves so good that the manufacturers dare to give them names that are more horrible and disturbing then the last:
  - Jane Curtin – Fluckers: "It's got to be good!"
  - Chevy Chase – Nose Hair: "You can imagine how good it must be… mm–mm!"
  - Dan Aykroyd – Death Camp: "Just look for the barbed wire on the label!"
  - John Belushi – Dog Vomit & Monkey Pus: "This stuff has got to be terrific!"
  - Chevy Chase – Painful Rectal Itch: "The taste? [mimicking chef's kiss] MMM WAH!"
  - Dan Aykroyd – Mangled Baby Ducks: "Great jam! Beautiful jam!"
  - John Belushi – 10,000 Nuns and Orphans: (responding to Jane's "What's so bad about that?" inquiry) "They were all eaten by rats! Oh so good!"
  - Garrett Morris, who mumbles the name of the jam he's brought in, one Jane assures the audience is "so disgusting you can't say it on television."
- Jar Glove – A parody of commercials that use black-and-white dramatizations to show someone struggling to perform an everyday task without the use of the product being sold. Here, a housewife (Kristen Wiig) accidentally kills her husband (Jason Sudeikis), resists arrest, is sentenced, goes to prison, plots and executes an escape, and hides out from prison guards—all because she struggled with opening the lid on a jar without benefit of the Jar Glove.
- Javis Home Security Systems – This Season 25 ad starts off as a pitch for baby wipes, featuring a man (Will Ferrell) reminiscing about the first time he changed his baby's diaper while changing a newborn. But it's not his child, as evidenced the baby's mother (Ana Gasteyer) becoming frantic upon entering the room ("Who the hell are you?!") and rushing to her infant while he makes a quick escape out of the window. The closing tag line: "Javis Home Security Systems. Because there are a lot of dirty creatures."
- Jensen Syringe Company — Spoofing anti-drug PSAs, this trio of ultra-brief ads from February 1990 spotlight the company's syringes dripping with solution, washing up on a beach ("fresh as a mountain stream"), or being thrown at a dart board.
- Jenson Mint – Phony currency rich people can give to homeless panhandlers, so that they can leave them alone once and for all (Chris Parnell gives Horatio Sanz a quarter reading "Not today, friend"; Darrell Hammond hands Tim Meadows a paper bill with an image of Pat Buchanan and the words "Suck it").
- Jeannie Darcy: Selective Startage – Episode host and SNL alum Molly Shannon reprises her standup comedienne character in this Season 48 promo for Netflix's "second ever live global event"… though just as before, Jeannie's jokes, uninspiring delivery, and her "don't get me started, don't even get me started" catchphrase fall flat with a dumbfounded audience.
- Jewess Jeans – Gilda Radner's recurring character Rhonda Weiss is the model in this parody of Jordache jeans and, to a lesser extent, Levy's rye bread. The Levy's-like tag line advises that "no one has to be Jewish" to wear Jewess ("but it wouldn't hurt," Weiss adds). "Jewess Jeans: Guaranteed to ride up!"
- Jiffy Express – When you forgot your package had to be at its destination yesterday, Jiffy employee Rob Schneider says "We'll take the package… AND the blame" by back-dating packages and simulating shipping delays.
- Jiffy Pop Air Bag – Eat popcorn while you're waiting for the ambulance to arrive, as Melanie Hutsell does here.
- Joe Caucasian, Joe Dude, Joe Hetero, and Joe Not-a-Rapist – Promos for Fox reality shows based on Joe Millionaire, where a bachelor tricks female contestants into thinking he (or in the case of Joe Dude, she) is white, a male, a heterosexual, or not a convicted serial rapist.
- Jogger Motel – A parody of the commercials for Black Flag Roach Motel roach traps. The tagline? "Joggers jog in, but they don't jog out".
- John-John Mackey's Storm Tracker Accu-Cast – "Are you tired of little boys trying to talk like weathermen, telling you what the weather may or may not be?" Then tune in on macho Mackey (Tim Meadows), who predicts the weather while consecutively showing it who's the boss ("Count on John-John Mackey to lasso the storm, take it apart, and show you how sad it really is"). "When I see a storm front coming, I'm all, "What's up, bitch?!" And the storm is all, "Not much, sir." And I'm all, "That's right, bitch! Now, go make me a sandwich!" And you want that kind of confidence in your weatherman!"
- Jon Hamm's John Ham – Writer Seth Meyers' trip to a restaurant restroom inspired him to write this October 2008 ad where the episode host and Mad Men star promotes ham on toilet paper-like rolls, installed in restroom stall dispensers opposite those for actual toilet paper, that allows one to spend their lunch break eating lunch and going to the bathroom. Also promoted is "Jon Hamm's Mustard Soap," sink dispensers that contain "a delicious mustard with no soap properties at all."
- The Jose Cuervo Institute – Does attending frat parties leave you seriously injured? This 1985 ad starring Randy Quaid (and airing as part of a game show entitled "Jose Cuervo's Party School Bowl") states that the college will rehabilitate anyone who has faced severe injury after partying hard. The tagline: "Working to repair damage we're ultimately responsible for."
- Jurassic Park 25th Anniversary DVD – One of the deluxe DVD's bonus features is a series of screen tests for the movie, including:
  - A verbose Hugh Grant (Alex Moffat) ("Excuse me, uh... there's -- there's a bolt of T-rex, and we should, uh -- run, uh, faster, to escape its rather large teeth.")
  - A perfectionist Alan Alda (episode host Bill Hader) ("How we gonna shoot that dinosaur? Is it gonna be forced perspective? That's how we shot Jamie Marr on M.A.S.H.. He's only about two feet tall.")
  - A comedic Ellen DeGeneres (Kate McKinnon) ("Is that a giant pile of dino poop? I've had stools on stage before, but this is ridiculous.")
  - A very Black Wesley Snipes (Chris Redd) ("Trust me, spend yo' money, a'ight? IRS can't take it if it's already spent... Now, if you want my accountant's number, I gotcha. It's 1-900-- (gets cut off)")
  - Roseanne Barr (Aidy Bryant), who still thinks she's doing Roseanne ("Welcome to Jurassic Park, Dan!")
  - A New York-y Adam Sandler (Pete Davidson) ("A-turkey-lurkey-doo and a-turkey-lurkey-dee. I like the T-rex, does the T-rex love me? Ah, shut up!")
  - An over-explaining Whoopi Goldberg (Leslie Jones) ("See, the last thing I need right now is dinosaurs.")
  - A kiddie Pee-Wee Herman (Mikey Day) ("Ah, ah, ah! You didn't say the magic word! (plays with the clapperboard like it's one of the dinosaurs)")
  - A flowery Drew Barrymore (Heidi Gardner) ("But I have to wonder... are we playing God?")
  - A "woah!"-ing Joey Lawrence (Kyle Mooney) ("Alright, react to seeing dinosaurs for the first time." "Woooooah!" "Want to try anything else?" "Noooooo!")
  - A musical Gwen Stefani (Melissa Villaseñor) ("I'm just a girl! Don't eat me, big dinosaur!")
  - A stand-uppy Sinbad (Kenan Thompson) ("My wife is a Triceratops. I wait downstairs while she tries on several tops.")
  - A vulgar Al Pacino (Hader) ("Welcome to Jurassic Park, ya dumb [expletive]." "Mr. Pacino, this movie is supposed to be PG." "PG? This is gonna be an [expletive] nightmare. Which dinosaur do I buy the cocaine from?")
  - A simpleminded Lisa Kudrow (McKinnon) ("Must move faster!")
  - An Urkel-y Jaleel White (Redd) ("Okay, so you just let all the dinosaurs out of their cages." "Did I do that? ...I got bitches in my trailer.")
  - A yarling Eddie Vedder (Luke Null) ("Raptors are opening the doooooooooor! DADDY--")
  - A dour Jodie Foster (McKinnon) ("This is the happiest I've ever been. Today is my birthday.")
  - An openly guilty O.J. Simpson (Thompson) ("So if I did let the dinosaurs out... lemme tell ya how I woulda done it... hypothetically.")
  - A dramatic Clint Eastwood (Hader) ("Willcome... tuh Jureysiuck Paourk!")

== K ==
- K-Put Price-Is-Rite Stamp Gun – A price-stamp gun that allows shoppers to freely alter the prices of various goods (particularly groceries) in their own favor.
- Kannon AE-1 – A camera that's "so simple, so advanced, even Stevie Wonder [as himself] can use it," though, because he's blind, the photos he takes of tennis pro John Newcombe (Joe Piscopo) are off-center or out of focus. A spoof of ads for Canon's AE-1 SLR.
- Kate & Ali – a series of promos for a spoof of Kate & Allie—only instead of two divorced women, it's screen legend Katharine Hepburn (Martin Short) sharing a domicile with boxing great Muhammad Ali (Billy Crystal).
- KCF Shredders – Jimmy Fallon headlines this ad that lampoons the fast food industry's marketing to kids, in this case with lettuce. "Now with How Stella Got Her Groove Back action figures!"
- Kemper Pedic Bed – Stacey & Pete Kemper (Vanessa Bayer and episode host Jason Segel) promote their "me-time mattress" that allows one spouse to get a very restful night's sleep while the other does whatever they desire.
- The Khaddaffi Look – In a satirical take on a popular Jordache ad campaign ("The Jordache Look"), the Libyan leader's clothing line has become the go-to fashion choice for revolutionaries and terrorists.
- Kiddie Metal – "Old MacDonald," "Bingo," and other kid-friendly tunes get the rock treatment from Guns N' Roses' Axl Rose (Adam Sandler) and Slash (episode host Kiefer Sutherland) in this November 1991 ad that also promotes the albums "Slash Performs Mother Goose" and "Dueling ABC's" (the latter featuring Axl and Slash teaming with Skid Row's Sebastian Bach and Rachel Bolan, appearing as themselves).
- Kim's Fairytale Divorce – "Whoopsies, I got divorced!" So admits Kim Kardashian (Nasim Pedrad) in this promo for the latest E! special centered on the Kardashian family, this time making a glamorous event out of Kim's divorce from Chris Humphries (Andy Samberg).
- King Brothers Toyota – In promoting their "Overstocked Sale-A-Thon," Randy King and Shorty King, Jr. (Andrew Dismukes and James Austin Johnson) advise viewers to "get hard in that left lane" of Exit 260 off Highway 8 to their Brenham, Texas dealership. Take the right lane and you'll get into the source of the brothers' animosity, "these trendy [fast food] chains" with massively popular drive-thru lanes (Raising Cane's in particular) that block access to their showroom.
- Kohler Co. toilet fixtures – Two ads that feature a stylishly suited protagonist (episode host Benedict Cumberbatch), an angry adversary (Mikey Day), and dark settings to promote new, stylish toilet designs from the plumbing company that's been "#1 in #2 since 1873"
  - Koohl Toilet – This toilet, promoted in a Season 42 spoof of the classic "1984" ad that introduced Apple's Macintosh computer (complete with Cumberbatch carrying a sledgehammer), allows one to sit "the cool way"—backwards, with their arms casually draped over the tank—as opposed to the forward-facing old toilets Big Brother (Day) has dictated the proletariat use.
  - ReKhline – In this Season 47 ad, the setting is now a schoolroom, and Cumberbatch now drops trow on a recliner-like toilet, complete with extendable footrests and tank as backrest; it upsets Day's stern teacher, who has just taught his pupils that "there's only one acceptable way to sit on the toilet" (sitting upright, feet firmly on floor).
- Kool-Aid – The same week Gillette launched an ad campaign that encouraged men to become better role models, this January 2019 PSA calls out the Kool-Aid Man and his longtime propensity to crash through walls as a bad influence of masculine behavior on both boys (Colin Jost's son plunges through another kid's play set) and grown men (Alex Moffat bursts through a conference room door, interrupting Heidi Gardner's business presentation).
- Kotex Classic – a very large sanitary napkin, attached to a belt and clearly visible under a woman's clothing, very much like the sanitary napkins worn by women and girls of the 1950s.

== L ==
- Lady Business – "From the creators of Lipstick Jungle and Cashmere Mafia" comes this series that follows three beautiful, powerful New York businesswomen (Amy Poehler, Kristen Wiig, and Casey Wilson), and a fourth woman (Tina Fey) who removes dead animals from under houses.
- The Laid-Back Neutral MCs – As the then-eminent trend of gangsta rap leads to constant acts of violence, two rappers (Tim Meadows and Tracy Morgan) prefer to play it safe, as evidenced by song titles like "I'm a Coward", "John Lennon Had Some Really Good Ideas", "You Don't Like John Lennon? Me Neither", and "That's Okay, You Can Have My Parking Space; As a Matter of Fact, You Can Have My Car".
- Lansford Brothers & Associates: Hangmen-At-Law – Professionally-done lynchings from a pair of businessman brothers (Will Forte and Bill Hader) who "know a thing or two about the art of a Texas necktie party."
- Lanzetti's Lawn Care – Steve and Sandy Lanzetti (Mikey Day and episode host Maya Rudolph) promise their company will handle all your landscaping needs... and only hire sexually awkward, socially repellent workers who won't get it on with your wife ("The only temptation is our low prices").
- The Laughing Buddha – Episode host Howard Hesseman promotes a health food store that sells novelty items people can use to play pranks on vegetarians, vegans, and those into the organic lifestyle.
- Law & Order: Parking Violations Unit – A promo for the latest addition to the Law & Order franchise, this one centered on the police who investigate parking crimes and the district attorneys who prosecute the ticket-challenging offenders.
- Leave Me Alurn – If women want to avoid small talk with men, they can use this "conversation prophylactic" in the shape of a funerary urn to make men think they want to be left alone while they spread their loved one's ashes. It's from the makers of Lower Back Spikes, a belt used for women who are sick of men touching them on the smalls of their backs when they walk past them.
- Leevi's Three-Legged Jeans – Various SNL cast members cavort about in these jeans that feature a redundant third leg in the middle. The Season 17 ad features a reggae-tinged jingle, various slogans (e.g. "Three at Last," "A leg and a leg and a leg"), and this ad-ending remark from Tim Meadows: "Hey, not any dumber than acid-washed."
- Lemon Glow – Ex-biker chick Molly Shannon wistfully recalls her drugs-and-sex days while cleaning the suburban home (and related family life) she's conned herself into, using this household cleaner "for the home you weren't sure you wanted."
- Leland-Meyers Home Headache Test (HHT) – Run a "moderate amount" of your blood in a centrifuge, place one drop on a test strip, and in two hours you'll learn whether or not you actually have a headache. A Season 20 lampoon of home pregnancy tests featuring Janeane Garofalo and Kevin Nealon.
- Lesbian Period Drama – "From the makers of Portrait of a Lady on Fire and The Favourite" comes this hauntingly lensed film featuring a cold, seaside setting, c. 1840; two straight actresses (Heidi Gardner and episode host Carey Mulligan) in the lead roles; 12 lines of dialog in a 2 1/2-hour run time; and "a sex scene so graphic, you'll think, 'Oh, right, a man directed this.'"
- The Less Provocative Songs of Katy Perry – Airing shortly after Perry topped the charts with her first hit "I Kissed a Girl" (which led people to falsely believe the provocative subject matter would make her a one-hit wonder), this ad finds Perry (Casey Wilson) singing songs similar to "I Kissed a Girl" that work around the "lez scandal" by making them about mundane subjects (i.e., "I Ate a Snack", "I Saw a Boat"). As one review by Rolling Stone very bluntly puts it, "No."
- Lettuce – Holding a distinction in SNL history as the first-ever SNL Digital Short, this ad features Andy Samberg and Will Forte talking about the loss of a friend of theirs while munching on raw heads of lettuce. The short is revealed to be an ad at the end, which shows a logo for the United Lettuce Growers Association and an announcer proclaiming "Lettuce: through good times and bad."
- Levi's Wokes – Sizeless (baggy), style-neutral (grayish brown), gender non-conforming denim jeans for a generation that defies labels.
- Lexon Paradox – Two automotive design teams produced two completely opposite cars (e.g., one was the most expensive car ever, the other the cheapest; one was the safest, the other designed to throw flaming victims hundreds of feet in a crash). In the end, the two were combined to create The Paradox.
- Lexus – The luxury car maker's "December to Remember" sales event is parodied in this 2020 ad that finds Beck Bennett surprising his wife and son (Heidi Gardner and episode host Timothée Chalamet) with a new Lexus sedan on Christmas morning, complete with a red bow on the roof. But Gardner is more horrified than surprised, considering Bennett has been out of a steady job for well over a year, thought the car cost only $3999 (that's just the down payment "due at signing"), and got neighbor Mikey Day to loan him the money. The closing tag line: "Give the gift of Lexus, and definitely talk it over first."
- Liberty Medical – Wilford Brimley (episode host John Goodman) begins his pitch for this medical supply delivery service by explaining how, with "dye-a-beetuss", he has to take extra care of his health, but continually qualifies, and admits to exaggerations, until by the end, he's described hiding a "food boner" over delivery of $200 worth of pork ribs to his house, never having moved fast enough to sweat, and the fact that he may not even have diabetes—his doctor "just thinks I look like the kinda guy who would have it".
- Liberty Mutual – A cut-for-time parody of the insurance company's "LiMu Emu and Doug" campaign from Season 49 finds Doug (played by episode host Shane Gillis) and his emu partner breaking down the door of a man (Marcello Hernández) who's been "paying for coverage they don't need." It ends horribly, though, when the emu shoots the man in cold blood and, before pulling a brick of cocaine from under the couch, plants an unmarked gun next to his body. LiMu's response upon Doug discovering his partner is a dirty cop: "We're in a bad part of town."
- Lil' General Fireworks – A fireworks manufacturer promotes their product as a family-friendly way to turn any boring weekend into the 4th of July.
- Lil' Poundcake – This Season 37 ad promotes a doll that's not only sweet enough for girls to play with, it gives them an FDA-approved HPV vaccination shot when they least expect it. The closing tag line: "The only thing you're gonna get infected with… is fun!"
- Lincoln Financial – Three spoofs of the investment company's "Get to know the future you" campaign, specifically an ad in which an airline passenger meets the future version of himself.
  - In Ad #1, a man (Jason Sudeikis) has oral sex with his future self;
  - Ad #2 finds another man (Bill Hader) learning from his future self that he's going to gain weight, go bankrupt, fly to Hawaii, and kill himself (but not before making out with him)
  - Ad #3 finds another man (episode host Ben Stiller) mistaking a female passenger (Abby Elliott) for his transgender future self.
- Lincoln MKC – Episode host Jim Carrey lampoons Matthew McConaughey's existential pitchwork for Lincoln's crossover utility vehicle in this trio of ads. McConaughey gets so lost in his deep thoughts that in the third ad, he drives right through an Allstate commercial parody, hitting Allstate pitchman Dennis Haysbert (Kenan Thompson) in the process. Carrey would later reprise this spoof in the Celebrity Jeopardy sketch in SNL's 40th Anniversary Special.
- Lite Beer – Bill Cosby (Eddie Murphy), much as he does with Jell-O, promotes the virtues of Lite to a table of children in this Season 6 ad, including telling them Fat Albert drinks it ("soon he won't be fat anymore, he'll just be Albert") and pouring it into their cupped hands (to demonstrate how "light" it is).
- Litter Critters – Cheri Oteri advertises a kit that allows children to take their cat's fecal waste and mold it into fun figurines. "♪♫ When you hear a scratch, here comes a batch — It's time for Litter Critters! ♪♫"
- Little Brothers – An ad similar in vein to Peyton Manning's "United Way" commercial; here, Manning's younger brother Eli is ambassador of a mentoring program for young boys who need a strong, male role model in their lives – and someone to beat up their mean older brothers (one of which, played by Andy Samberg, is locked in the trunk of a car and mistakenly referred to as "Peyton"). The commercial ends with the tag line "Little Brothers: Because the time of reckoning is now at hand", followed by Eli and his young charges laughing maniacally.
- Little Chocolate Donuts – "Decathlon champion John Belushi" promotes "The Donuts of Champions" in this parody of Bruce Jenner's (Note: Bruce Jenner is now known as Caitlyn Jenner due to gender transition in 2015.) pitch work for Wheaties. Even though they're literally just tiny chocolate donuts, Belushi trusts them. Why? "They taste good, and they've got the sugar I need to get me going in the morning."
- Little Red Glasses – For women who are into books (if not run a bookstore), have "bad therapist" as their profession, or are "the mom from Bob's Burgers," red-framed eyeglasses are, according to Ego Nwodim's character, "fashionable, fun, and sexy! Just kidding, but they do magnify text!" The Season 50 ad also features episode host Lady Gaga and Sarah Sherman; the latter's half-framed specs were purchased by NBC from a Minneapolis eyewear company that got an "As Seen on SNL" sales bump post-airing.
- Lobotol – Fashion designer Nancy Walls talks about how it's hard to keep up with overachieving colleague Katie (Cheri Oteri). But once she sees Katie feeling stressed out, Nancy recommends to Katie this non-prescription "stress relief" medication ("No need to consult a physician before use" according to an on-screen graphic). Three weeks later, Nancy is the one with a pay raise, while Katie appears vacant and confused.
- Lonely Choice – Single women like Sheila Caldwell (Siobhan Fallon) prefer to eat 'em and weep with these frozen dinners made specifically for people like them (varieties include "Stood-Up Meatloaf" and "No Regrets Beans and Franks"); special features include two sleeping pills on top of a turkey breast. The tagline: "We've taken the difficult out of difficult and sad."
- Long Island Girls – If you like your phone sex operators to have a bit more of an edge, you can just dial 1-600-LONG-ISLAND and be met by a female New Yorker (two unnamed operators played by Ana Gasteyer and Cheri Oteri and one named Stacey Levitt played by Molly Shannon) with a thick accent... one who not only uses confusing New York slang, but also seems more likely to be aroused by the caller rather than arouse him (unless that caller is Colin Quinn, who seems to understand every word they're saying).
- Long White Beard – "Let 'em know you've been waiting" by donning this obviously fake beard whenever someone who's taking too long to arrive, return, etc. is quite tardy.
- The Looker – TNT's newest procedural drama stars Penny Marshall (Fred Armisen) as a police interrogator who gets suspects to sign confessions simply by staring at them for long periods of time.
- Loose Bear – a hallucinogenic laxative that makes you dream you're being chased in the woods by a hungry bear, thus "scaring the crap out of you". "Side effects may include uncontrollable pissing and heart failure."
- L'Oréal Easy Run Mascara – A combination of "really, really low-quality mascara… and also a little printer ink" for when you want to show the world you're "a complete and total mess."
- Lori Davis Hair Spray Exciting Hold – Listed in the SNL sketch records as "Focus on Beauty II", this infomercial spoof promotes an environmentally conscious hair spray with no alcohol in it, featuring episode host Christina Applegate as Cher, Chris Farley as Lori Davis, and Phil Hartman as "Brad in the Lab".
- Love Island – The British reality TV series (and inspiration for the summer guilty pleasure on CBS) comes to Hulu, complete with contestants sporting an exhibitionist streak, an aim to hook up with someone... and hard-to-comprehend regional dialects.
- The Love Toilet – Victoria Jackson & Kevin Nealon share the most intimate moment of them all... on a single-based toilet with two seats, placed so that the seated users can face each other. "Because when you're in love, even five minutes apart can seem like an eternity."
- The Lung Brush – used every night by heavy smoker Chris Farley to remove quarts of tar from his lungs before going to bed with wife Victoria Jackson ("Did you forget to brush?"). Former NFL quarterback Ken Stabler makes a celebrity endorsement cameo.
- Lux 420 SL – Cliff Robertson, in a deadpan cameo, promotes the car that caters to insane people; designed by such notables as Nostradamus, its features include an in-console sink for compulsive hand washing and enough trunk space to hold copious vials of one's own urine. The jingle at the end: "There's a radio in my fingernail… CAR!!"

== M ==
- Mack North – Even though he handily defeated opponent Fred Peete (Chris Parnell) in the 6th district election, North (Will Ferrell) continues his campaign against him with a trio of attack ads, all in an effort to rub his victory in Peete's face.
- Macy's – For its 2019 holiday sale, the department store promotes discounts on men's blazers; cashmere tops; and for kids, clothes they'll immediately loathe because they're itchy, too tight, will soil easily (due to not making it to the bathroom in time), and cause their parents to lose their temper while trying to keep them neat. The closing tag line: "The clothes they'll hate create the memories you'll love."
- Magic Mouth – a device which is inserted into the rectum and converts flatulence into "polished expressions" (e.g. "Did you see Charlie Rose last night?").
- MAHAspital – "For people who love The Pitt but can't stand its phony liberal science," Health Secretary Robert F. Kennedy, Jr. and "the people who want to make America healthy again" offer an alternative medical drama in which hospital staff forbid prescribing Tylenol for pain, take a comatose vegan off life support, and offer or perform other guidance & procedures right out of the MAHA movement. A shirtless Kennedy, Jr. (played by James Austin Johnson) makes a cameo appearance by wheeling a dead bear into the emergency room ("He's been dead for days, but the meat's still good!").
- Majestic Caribbean Cruise Line – This 1994 ad states that the cruise line has everything... including basketball player Manute Bol (as himself), who happens to be everywhere on the ship, much to the gradually growing discomfort of passengers Rob Schneider and Melanie Hutsell.
- Man Park – It's like a dog park, but for men in relationships who stay at home alone and have nobody other than their wives and girlfriends to chat or play with.
- Man Stain – A line of men's cosmetics (or "revolutionary skin ammo") marketed with manly names and dispensers (e.g. base foundation in a beer can, blush in a calking gun). A cut-for-time ad from Season 46.
- Mario Kart – After successfully making a TV series out of The Last of Us video game, HBO doubles down and turns the Nintendo classic into a dystopian drama. This trailer features episode host (and The Last of Us star) Pedro Pascal as Mario shepherding Princess Peach (Chloe Fineman) through the ruins of Rainbow Road.
- MartinSheen – A hair spray which consists of episode host Martin Sheen sipping water from a paper cup and spitting it on Jane Curtin's hair as she pitches the product, pausing occasionally to nod in agreement with her statements (e.g. "MartinSheen is eco-friendly. You wouldn't dream of hurting the environment, would you?").
- Mary-Kate & Ashley Perfume – The perfume that fits your mood, whether you're an Ashley or a Mary-Kate. A female voice-over whispers "Ashley" to one activity and "Mary-Kate" to another in contrast.
- Marzipan – Spokesman Kenan Thompson and a chorus of well-behaved British children (Chloe Fineman, Bowen Yang, Sarah Sherman, Marcello Hernández, and episode host Austin Butler) praise the virtues of "the mostly almond, almost candy from Germany" that comes in various kid-friendly shapes and has "the flavor of nuts, but the texture of nuts." The tagline: "You'll believe your mouth."
- Mastercard – The credit card's "Priceless" campaign and the Clinton–Lewinsky scandal are parodied in this September 1998 ad ("Making Yasser Arafat wait while you and a friend masturbate: Priceless").
- MasterClass Quarantine Edition – The online education platform, in two Spring 2020 ads, offers celebrity-hosted courses for those seeking new pursuits while in quarantine during the COVID-19 pandemic:
  - The first ad, featuring Chloe Fineman in all roles, highlights hat-and-hoodie-heavy fashion tips from Timothée Chalamet, TikTok tutorials from JoJo Siwa, and bicycling tips from Tiger King's Carole Baskin ("I didn't kill my husband").
  - The second ad includes tips on writing personal journals from Phoebe Waller-Bridge (Fineman), looking good in a suit from John Mulaney (Melissa Villaseñor), and "something" from Britney Spears (Fineman), who coos that "the thing that helps me most during quarantine is being rich."
- Match.com – This ad for the dating website features various female site members talking about the man they hope to find... and Martha Stewart (Kate McKinnon), who just wants "a successful man… for intercourse."
- Maya Angelou – David Alan Grier, in his 1997 turn as episode host, mimics the acclaimed poet and her flowery, emotional, hyperbolic prose in a trio of ads, including:
  - Butterfinger candy ("Glad mantle of golden chocolaty hope upon my breast.")
  - Froot Loops ("Fruity loops, fruit loopies, swimming in the churning, frothy mother sea of milk.")
  - Pennzoil ("O! Magic shining ewer of liquid ball bearings.")
- Maybelline For Men – Finally, cosmetics for guys, which Fred Armisen, Andy Samberg, Bill Hader, Will Forte, and Jason Sudeikis happily apply.
- Maybelline New York – Jennifer Coolidge (Chloe Fineman) and her mirror reflection (episode host Ariana Grande) converse in this ad for Maybelline's new "Super Stay Longwear liquid lip liner." Returning SNL alum Dana Carvey also appears as Coolidge's "side mirror reflection."
- Maydenform – Episode host Tony Danza repeatedly voices his opinion on lingerie: "Boombadah boombadah boombadah boom!"
- McDonald's Soviet Happy Meal – On the week that Mickey D's opened its first location in the Soviet Union (at Moscow's Pushkin Square), this February 1990 ad promotes Happy Meals that don't include movie-promotion toys but rather human necessities such as toilet paper, a thread & needle for sewing, or, as Jan Hooks' enthusiastic store employee notes in the ending tag line, bars of soap ("At McDonald's, it's good times, great taste… SOAP!!").
- McIntosh Jr. – A parody of early ads for Apple's Macintosh computer that promises elementary-school users "the power to crush the other kids!"
- McIntosh Post-It Notes – Apple follows up on its Macintosh PowerBook and Newton PDA with this palm-sized device that has "the practicality of a Post-it Note [versatility, convenience, sticky back] with the power of a McIntosh [handwriting-to-text, editing]."
- McSooshi – "America's eating it raw!", "it" being this new "raw fishy" meal at McDonald's.
- Mean, Scary Girlfriend — For those whose regular girlfriends are too kind and supportive to give straight answers, this alternative (episode host Dakota Johnson) comes loaded with biting catchphrases (e.g. "No, go change"), withholds compliments ("you look like a pedophile on vacation"), only wants to have sex when you're at your lowest point, and comes with a fiercely protective friend (Grace Reiter) and a dog who hates you.
- Medcast by One Medical – Recognizing that men ages 20–45 get their health advice through influencers, the healthcare company offers this innovative way to get them to see the doctor: Turn the checkup into a podcast (complete with microphones and witty co-hosts).
- Mega-Mart – In this 2010 ad, an amped-up Bobby Moynihan promotes the big-box retailer's "12-Minute Madness" sale at 4AM on Black Friday. A "savings stampede" will be assured thanks to freshly-waxed floors ("Slide into savings!"), no security guards (to make room for more merchandise), box cutters for every customer (to remove overstocked items from the back of the store), and such exclusive offers as a previously unreleased Harry Potter book. Also featured is customer Janice Wrust (episode host Anne Hathaway), in line 20 hours before the store opens yet all-psyched to get her hands on a Disney scrapbooking kit.
- M3GAN 2.0 – The robotic title character of the motion picture M3GAN has become an icon to gay men, prompting this sequel centered on a newer model (episode host Aubrey Plaza) programmed to party alongside the original doll (Chloe Fineman) and the "little homos" at the clubs. M3GAN star Allison Williams has a cameo in this January 2023 trailer.
- Me-Harmony.com – A 2005 lampoon of eHarmony promotes a matchmaking website for narcissists. Various SNL castmembers have dual roles as both the happy Me-Harmony client and, in drag, their perfect mate. The ad also promotes its sister service, the gay matchmaking site He-Harmony.com.
- Mellen – Men are staying at home more, but there's no daytime talk show that caters to them. So, "ABC thought about it for 10 seconds" and came up with "the male Ellen," hosted by a guy who posted a lot on 4chan (episode host Jason Sudeikis in an Ellen DeGeneres wig) and who, in this promo from Season 47, adds a "hard masculine edge" to interviews, viral segments, and Ellen-style sneak-up pranks including Kyrie Irving (Chris Redd) getting a surprise COVID-19 vaccination.
- Mel's Char Palace – Mel (Dan Aykroyd), with help from a saw-wielding "Mrs. Mel" (Gilda Radner), promotes his steakhouse on "Route 17, Paramus" where diners select their own steer, cuts and portions ("You stun it, you cut it, you charbroil it").
- Mercury Mistress – This spoof of luxury automobile ads promotes "a car so sexy, you'll just want to have sex with it" (because a rubber vagina is hidden behind its license plate).
- Metrocard – A customer-and-employee credit card testimonial starring Phil Hartman as a business traveler who needed to call Metrocard's customer service line, and episode host Roseanne Barr as the sassy representative that came to his assistance ("Yeah, like I've got nothing better to do than to sit around and listen to him bitch").
- Michael Braslow's Santa Traps – If you're sick and tired of Santa Claus creeping around your house every December, writer/inventor Michael Braslow (episode host Martin Freeman) recommends his bear trap-style product designed to capture Santa... though it clearly traps more bears than elves. Braslow's sorrowful wife (Cecily Strong) explains why Santa is at risk: Michael hasn't been the same since being hit in the head by a hockey puck. A cut-for-time ad from 2014.
- Michael Bublé Christmas Duets – The singer, appearing as himself, follows up his solo holiday album with this collection of seasonal duets with celebrities who are the opposite of Bublé's elegant charm, among them a starstruck Taylor Swift (Kristen Wiig), a vamping Justin Bieber (episode host Jimmy Fallon), a wisecracking Russell Brand (also Fallon), and a gun-wielding M.I.A. (Nasim Pedrad).
- Michael Phelps Diet – The Olympic champion swimmer shows his "eat whatever you want, and as much as you want" diet, one that, by virtue of its high-calorie count (12,000, the actual number of calories Phelps was required to consume while training), is almost certainly fatal to anyone who's not an Olympic-caliber athlete. Subway pitchman Jared Fogle appears, stating "this diet sucks a foot long".
- Middle American Van Lines – A moving company that moves families instead of their belongings.
- The Midnight Coterie of Sinister Intruders – Wes Anderson applies his eccentric filmmaking style to a home invasion/slasher movie in this trailer starring Owen Wilson (Edward Norton), Gwyneth Paltrow (Noël Wells), Danny Glover (Jay Pharoah), Tilda Swinton (Kate McKinnon), Anjelica Huston (Note: The original airing of The Midnight Coterie of Sinister Intruders misspelled Anjelica Huston's first name as "Angelica," while the online version and all TV reruns have the correct spelling) (Cecily Strong), Jason Schwartzman (Kyle Mooney), Adrien Brody (Mike O'Brien), a stop-motion mouse, and Alec Baldwin (appearing as himself) as the narrator.
- Mike's stores – Thick-accented Mike (Fred Armisen) promotes his outlets in Lynbrook, Long Island whose inventories can add millionaire-style class to your surroundings, while "beautiful daughter" Lexie (episode host Scarlett Johansson) assists ([pointing to rotating images on the screen] "Imagine walking in your house and seein' dis one. Or dat one. Or dis one.").
  - Mike & Toni's Chandelier Galaxy (Season 31), in which Mike, with wife Toni (Rachel Dratch) nodding in agreement, tells viewers that chandeliers add elegance to any room in the house, even the garage.
  - Mike's Marbleopolis (Season 32), where a fine assortment of "mawble cawlums" will make any home or room look like a castle.
  - Mike's Fountainry (Season 34) finds Mike and Lexie telling how "pawww-celain fountains" will turn your home into a mansion, while Mike's visibly nervous son-in-law Nick (episode host Ryan Reynolds) reassures viewers that "I come to you" to handle installation and repairs.
  - Mike's Busteria (Season 36), where ceramic busts will make people "think you own a Mercedes and have a tennis court behind the bushes."
- Mikko's Got Your Nose Safety Guard – Spokesperson Brad Hall promotes this facial guard that protects kids' noses from inadvertent (and all-too-bloody) accidents during supposedly-safe games of I've Got Your Nose.
- Milsford Spring Water – Tom Bodett narrates as a bottled water's unusually "rich history" is re-enacted: Rather than share a pure spring creek with neighboring Dunbee, the Massachusetts town of Milsford brutally destroys Dunbee and most of its residents — "over 107… days ago. You probably heard about it on the TV".
- Mmmph? – The rules are simple: Six friends (in this case, Chris Farley, Kevin Nealon, Ellen Cleghorne, Julia Sweeney, Tim Meadows, and Melanie Hutsell) gather around and try to guess an object one player has. Unlike most guess-the-object board games (like Pictionary or Hedbanz), however, Mmmph? not only requires you to keep your object secret until it's guessed correctly, you're also not supposed to specify if the other players' guesses are closer to the correct answer or not. Instead, you're supposed to vaguely mutter "Mmmph" in differing tones to imply "warmer" or "colder" (as Cleghorne does here), causing confusion out of everyone.
- The Mob — This Season 15 ad promotes the mafia as the people to turn to when you can't get a bank loan, with a flower shop owner (Nora Dunn) willingly offering a postivive testimonial and a "spokesman" (Kevin Nealon) advising prospective customers, "to them [banks], you're just another customer; to us, you're family."
- Mom Celebrity Translator – "Available wherever mom products are sold… so, Ann Taylor," this handheld electronic device allows young'uns to decipher what well-known celebrity their not-very-hip mothers are trying to describe to them (e.g. "Kite Carbinaw" to Kim Kardashian) or who they're trying to describe to their moms (Kid: "I like Jake Gyllenhaal… sorry, 'Joe Geronimo.'" Mom: "He was so awesome in Breakdance Fountain.")
- Mom Jeans – Inspired by writer Tina Fey purchasing high-waisted jeans by accident, these jeans feature 9-inch zippers, casual front pleats, and a generous, extra-rounded cut "to fit a mom's body." On sale exclusively at JCPenney (who'll throw in a "free Applique Mom Jeans Vest" with each purchase), these jeans say, "I'm not a woman anymore; I'm a mom."
- Mom: The Movie – "Streaming now on HomeGoods+" and featuring Ashley Padilla as the title character, this film's feel-good/low-stakes plot (the house is always clean, the adult children are back home and well-adjusted, and the husband is played by episode host Matt Damon) is perfect for moms to watch on Mother's Day weekend.
- Morgan Stanley – This 2005 ad finds a man (Will Forte) scolding young Ashley (Amy Poehler) with threats to empty out her college fund after she's caught smoking pot at school (he also accuses Ashley's boyfriend, portrayed by Andy Samberg, of being her drug dealer). The man, however, is not Ashley's father but her family's "Morgan Stanley guy" (dad Fred Armisen meekly greets Ashley in the car). A parody of the investment bank's "One Client at a Time" campaign that dramatized the family-like bond between its agents and their clients.
- Mostly Garbage Dog Food – Dog lover Jason Sudeikis gets his priorities straight by serving bagged garbage to his canine pal as a money-saving measure because of current economic issues.
- Murdur Durdur – A promo for a spoof of Mare of Easttown, set in a Pennsylvania village where everyone knows each other and shares a very specific (and at times indecipherable) Pennsylvania accent, and whose police department includes a "grizzled lady detective" played by "an actress (Kate McKinnon, channeling Mare's Kate Winslet) with a messy ponytail that says 'forget I'm actually British.'"
- MyCornerGuy — Why rely on phone apps that give your health data to big tech companies when there's this service that's just a guy on the street corner (personified by episode host Druski) providing "just raw, sometimes offensive data" on your health, fitness, and habits as you walk past him.
- My Drunk Boyfriend – For the woman who longs to care for their inebriated boyfriend, there's this life-sized animatronic doll that comes pre-programmed with slurring speech and inappropriate actions (e.g. urinating in the clothes hamper, bringing a burnt pizza to bed, crying over a dead, unknown relative, and passing up a glass of water to have one more beer). Also available is My Drunk Girlfriend, for men who want to care for their inebriated paramours.
- My Little Step Children – Dolls for children who like playing with dolls but would rather pretend-play being the uncaring stepparent than the loving mommy. A cut-for-time ad from 2018.

== N ==
- National Nurses Week – People in the nursing profession tell about their love of their work in this May 2024 ad, including two nursing home attendants (Ego Nwodim and episode host Maya Rudolph) caring for a dementia-addled patient (Mikey Day) and his atrocious behavior.
- National Uvula Association – In this "public service dramatization," sibling Laraine Newman and house-call doctor Chevy Chase advise Gilda Radner and the audience to take proper care of the uvula, without ever saying what the uvula actually is (a small piece of flesh hanging from the rear of the human mouth's soft palate that requires little, if any, maintenance).
- National Workforce of Rethinking Disabilities (N.W.O.R.D.) – One week after activist John Davidson, who lives with Tourette syndrome, uttered a racial epithet during the 79th British Academy Film Awards (while Black actors Michael B. Jordan and Delroy Lindo were presenting onstage), various disgraced celebrities claim their suffering from the condition is the reason for their own past offensive statements and behaviors, among them Mel Gibson (Andrew Dismukes), Jill Zarin (Sarah Sherman), Armie Hammer (episode host Connor Storrie), Bill Cosby (Kenan Thompson), J. K. Rowling (Ashley Padilla), Louis C.K. (James Austin Johnson), Kanye West (Kam Patterson), and Michael Che (as himself). After the cut-for-time sketch was posted online, it raised the ire of advocacy group Tourettes Action, whose CEO stated, "Mocking a disability [such as Tourette] is not acceptable."
- Navy Adventure (Port of Call: Bayonne, New Jersey) – A Season 4 spoof of the United States Navy's recruiting commercials. Instead of training and missions, here sailors perform such mundane things as mopping decks, cleaning toilets, doing laundry, and performing kitchen duty. The closing tag line: "It's not just a job [or an adventure], it's $96.78 a week!"
- NBC: Our Age Is Showing – A self-parody of NBC's "Our Pride Is Showing" campaign from the 1981–82 season, complete with a deteriorating "Proud N" logo.
- NBC – Following the success of their hit superhero series The Cape, NBC doubles down and premieres several other TV shows about superheroes based on articles of clothing, among them The Scarf, The Leg Warmer, and The Bolo Tie. The tagline: "Take it or leave it."
- NCI – Spokesperson David Spade makes outlandish promises for this long-distance phone company's service, among them a guarantee that who you want to call will be at home to answer.
- Nebulzitol – An FDA-approved drug wives can give to their husbands when they've got March madness (its name literally means "no balls at all").
- Ned's Roach-Away – Ned (episode host Charles Barkley) promotes his alternative to roach control products that contain harmful chemicals: Specially trained roaches with miniature firearms, because "the only thing that can stop a bad roach is a good roach with a gun."
- Nelson's Baby Toupees – Bill Hader pitches these baby-sized versions of adult-styled toupees that helps alleviate the stigma of "male infantile baldness" and foster babies' social interaction skills.
- Nerf Crotch Bat – Chris Farley and Rob Schneider headline this ad for the latest addition to the Nerf line of toys, a bat cushioned in Nerf foam that kids and adults use to hit each other in the genital area. Also advertised are "Nerf Crotch Missile" and "Nerf Nerf", the latter a formless plasmatic blob of Nerf foam material.
- Nespresso – This 2015 spoof of George Clooney's pitchwork for the coffee company depicts Danny DeVito (Bobby Moynihan) stalking Clooney (Taran Killam) in search of Nespresso, getting sidetracked along the way. The tagline: "What?" (a riff on Nespresso's "What else?" slogan).
- Nest-spresso – Urban farming is made easy with this Nespresso-like machine that incubates a fertilized chicken egg in minutes.
- Netflix – The streaming service announces their heavy spending on film and series development that will create an "endless scroll" of content in 2019, will take twelve human lifetimes to get through, and will cause the end of the world via The Singularity. Among the new offerings:
  - Saved by the Crown, a Saved by the Bell knock-off which puts young Queen Elizabeth II (episode host Claire Foy, who played the young queen in The Crown) into a high school setting
  - Officer Winslow, a gritty reboot of Family Matters where Carl Winslow (Kenan Thompson) is a gun-toting alcoholic who threatens to shoot Steve Urkel (Chris Redd) for once again hitting on his daughter, Laura (Ego Nwodim)
  - Leslie Jones in a Van Buying Batteries, an unscripted comedy in which Jones' trip to "go get some Duracells" goes pear-shaped when she runs over a cyclist with her van and flees an incoming police car's sirens
- Network Battle of the T's & A's – This Season 4 promo for an NBC celebrity competition special features gratuitous shots of female competitors "with the biggest T's, and the nicest A's!" A spoof of ABC's Battle of the Network Stars in particular, and in general the late-1970s trend of TV casts featuring well-endowed, suggestively-clad women.
- Neuburg's Blue Cheese Cooler – After a stellar game, baseball coach Kevin Nealon and his team party the night away with this cheesy beverage that, even though it's perfect for celebration, also smells really bad.
- Neutrogena Coin Slot Moisturizer – Since new fashions increasingly leave your coin slot exposed to sun and wind, use this special moisturizer to keep it soft and supple. A 2006 parody of Neutrogena's specialized moisturizing products starring Kristen Wiig and episode host Lindsay Lohan.
- New Balance – Shoes made for athletes to run in... and for "chubby white guys in their late 30s to early 40s" to stand around in ("Because your feet literally won't fit into any other shoe").
- New Dad Insurance – SNL's very first commercial parody, promoting "a radically new concept in family insurance coverage": If the father of the house departs for any reason, a replacement dad will be there within seconds to care for your family's emotional and physical needs.
- New York City Police Department – Police Commissioner Craig W. Doyle (Phil Hartman) warns New Yorkers about the punishment in a new anti-crime bill: If you kill someone in the city and get caught, you're headed to jail for 10 weeks ("no ifs, ands, or buts").
- New York City PSA – Various New Yorkers show gratitude for the essential workers, healthcare providers, volunteers, and other fellow residents who've stayed resilient during the COVID-19 pandemic... but getting the most screen time is an older woman (Kate McKinnon) in Central Park seen dancing, lounging topless, and presenting a one-woman version of The Lion King while Broadway is shuttered.
- Nextdoor – A filmed ad for the hyperlocal social networking service finds an apartment-dwelling teen (episode host Billie Eilish) viewing a lonely elderly woman (Kate McKinnon) in the next building over, and with her mother's permission invites her via handwritten messages for her family's Christmas dinner. Soon, however, the girl learns that the woman is a bigot ("Are there any black people over there? Jews?"), thinks dogs are a culinary delicacy, and is imposing her will on her ailing son, Gunther (Mikey Day). Nextdoor's closing tag line: "This holiday season, know thy neighbor before you love them."
- Next for Men – A new antiperspirant for famous men – such as a stand-up comedian (Kyle Mooney), a big-time Hollywood actor (Alex Moffat), or a Fortune 500 CEO (Will Ferrell) – whose careers are on the line due to sexual misconduct allegations.
- NFL Gives Back – In this cut-for-time ad from Season 48, the National Football League, in cooperation with United Way, shows players spending the off-season "using their strength for an important charitable cause" – lifting women whose weak or uncoordinated boyfriends can't pick them up. Episode host, and Kansas City Chiefs player, Travis Kelce is featured along with fellow NFL players Creed Humphrey of the Chiefs and Jason Kelce (Travis' brother) of the Philadelphia Eagles.
- Nice Jail – After his own time in stir (where his vampire-style hair was the source of fellow inmates' jokes), Abby Westminster (episode host Willem Dafoe) converts a former Marriott hotel into a more-pleasant alternative for inmates who are (or in some cases, eventually will) do time... even though the criminal justice system doesn't recognize it as a jail (the ad's "it doesn't count" tagline admits this). A cut-for-time ad from Season 47.
- Nicotrel – A parody of smoking-cessation products featuring Dwayne "The Rock" Johnson as ex-Army soldier Nick Cotrell, who beats up a wimpy husband (played by Chris Parnell) to get him to quit smoking. At the end of the sketch, other wrestlers (including Mick Foley, Paul "Big Show" Wight, and Paul "Triple H" Levesque) join in the action.
- Night Murmurs – An ad for a phone sex hotline where three scantily-clad operators (Cecily Strong, Kate McKinnon, and episode host Cameron Diaz) can't wait to talk to you... but they need some assistance in return (Strong in scaring her grandmother, McKinnon in not taking silly bets, Diaz in picking up a dangerous package).
- Nike Air Force Ones – Fred Armisen, Bill Hader, Will Forte, Kenan Thompson, Andy Samberg, and Jason Sudeikis play basketball together and repeatedly show that they have no skills in the sport, ending with Samberg getting seriously injured. The tagline: "With the way you play, you don't need these shoes."
- Nike Pro-Chiller Leggings – women's athletic endurance pants that are perfect for whether you're actually exercising or, in the cases of two women played by Kate McKinnon and Aidy Bryant, lounging around your couch on a lazy afternoon.
- Nikey Turkey – Chris Rock raps about the perfect solution to a small meal for a large Thanksgiving gathering: A turkey that can be inflated by pressing a built-in pump button ("Pump it up!").
- No, Bruce! Let Me Finish! The Best of Celebrity Tirades – Following the real-life incident in which he mercilessly berated a movie-production crew member for simply moving a lighting rack, Christian Bale (episode host Bradley Cooper), in an attempt to take some heat off of himself, hawks a DVD of footage featuring other celebrities, such as George Foreman (Kenan Thompson), Joan Cusack (Abby Elliott), Nathan Lane (Bobby Moynihan), and Mad Money's Jim Cramer (Darrell Hammond) screaming at crew members for their perceived incompetence. All proceeds from the DVD go to Bale's legal defense fund.
- Non-Non-Alcoholic Beer – Andrew Dismukes says he switched to non-alcoholic beer but discovered he wasn't getting drunk, so now he drinks "the first non-alcoholic beverage that's over 96% alcohol" ("Double the negative, double the party" is the closing tagline).
- Norman Bates School of Motel Management – Norman (episode host Anthony Perkins, reprising his role from Psycho) promotes home-study courses on the responsibilities of managing your own motel.
- North American Savings – How does this savings bank keep its customers' money safe? By ensuring that with extremely stringent requirements, "we make virtually no loans at all, rejecting 97% of loan applications."
- "Not a Record Ad" – Joe Piscopo narrates this ad for something that promises several things, such as saving on dental bills and keeping Tony Orlando away from your home. It's never actually stated what the product is, but one thing is repeatedly made clear: "This is NOT A RECORD AD!"
- Now That's What I Call Music! – The series of compilation albums featuring music by various artists has been spoofed in three SNL ad parodies:
  - Now That's What Actors Call Singing – Actors perform awful versions of well-known pop tunes, including Kevin Bacon and his brother Michael (Will Ferrell and episode host Jack Black), Keanu Reeves (Jimmy Fallon), Kevin Spacey (Jeff Richards), James Gandolfini (Darrell Hammond), and Russell Crowe (Seth Meyers).
  - Now That's What I Call Christmas! – A holiday music album with Lorde (Kate McKinnon), DMX (Jay Pharoah), Harry Styles (episode host Jimmy Fallon) and others giving their own unique takes on famed carols.
  - Now That's What I Call Theme Songs Sung by Stars of the Show! – Inspired by TV shows whose theme songs are sung by the show's actors (Frasier, The Fresh Prince of Bel-Air, My Life as a Teenage Robot, etc.) in general, and in particular Nicole Kidman (Chloe Fineman) performing The Undoing's theme, other actors add vocals (and blunt plot summaries) to their own shows' previously instrumental-only themes. The stars include Anya Taylor-Joy (Melissa Villaseñor) for The Queen's Gambit ("Chess and drugs, and drugs and chess"); narrator Julie Andrews (Cecily Strong) for Bridgerton ("Sex, lots of color-blind sex"); and episode host John Krasinski for The Office ("Scranton… that's where we all live and work").
- Nugenix – A spoof of ads for the testosterone-boosting male enhancement supplement endorsed by athletes Frank Thomas (Kenan Thompson) and Doug Flutie (Kyle Mooney); here, they're assisted by episode host "Sir Willem Dafoe" (because he's frequently mistaken for being British) in talking up Nugenix to a fellow golfer (Mikey Day) who denies having trouble "getting hard."
- Nutri-Quick – Carlson (Jeff Richards) can't get a nutritious, balanced lunch in one on-the-go sitting. Thankfully, this anal suppository features all the essential nutrients "at levels more than twice the FDA daily allowances" ("Why slam it when you can cram it?").
- NuvaBling – This version of the NuvaRing birth control device doubles as a customizable jewelry accessory (placed around the vaginal area) for women not trying to get pregnant while enjoying the night out ("100% effective at getting dat swag on")... but as testimonials from users Vanessa Bayer, Kate McKinnon, and Cecily Strong attest, it hurts as much as it works.

== O ==
- Octane – A trailer for an action movie starring Seth Meyers and Finesse Mitchell that uses cheap toy models as "special effects".
- Oedipal Arrangements – Fruit and chocolate bouquets that allow men to show their moms love in a way their dads never will.
- Olay Eye Black – Episode host J. J. Watt promotes an under-eye cosmetic that smells like Jack Daniels, gasoline, and matcha extract (green tea) for football players like Watt (and men in general) who want to look tough and get rid of dark under-eye circles and bags that come with aging.
- Old Glory Insurance – A parody of ads that center around older celebrities (such as Wilford Brimley and Alex Trebek) promoting insurance for senior citizens. Sam Waterston, in a deadpan performance as "Paid Spokesperson", touts the advantages of the only life insurance company to provide full coverage against the leading killer of the elderly: attacks from robots that feed on the medications the elderly often use.
- Old Negro Beer – A stereotypically Black man (Eddie Murphy) explains that, after a long day of playing basketball, watching Shaft, etc., he likes to guzzle down this beer made specifically for him... and his whitebred friend (Joe Piscopo), whose Caucasian identification puts Murphy in utter shock ("Hey... you a white [slur]!").
- Once-A-Day Extra-Strength Nasaflu – Kristen Wiig has a hard time pitching this cold remedy due to constant interruptions from husband Gary's (Will Ferrell) over-the-top shout-like sneezes ("Just sneeze like a normal person!").
- One Battle After Another Action Figures – Mattel introduces a line of dolls, toys, and play sets inspired by the critically lauded action-thriller in this ad featuring episode host and One Battle co-star Teyana Taylor ("Welcome to the revolution, kids"), whose Perfidia Beverly Hills figure comes complete "with snap-on [pregnancy] belly and machine gun."
- Only Bangkok – The playful "What Happens Here, Stays Here" campaign that trumpets Las Vegas as an adult tourist destination is parodied in this three-part ad promoting Thailand's capital:
  - In part one, Ben Affleck (playing himself) sells his wife (played by Amy Poehler) to two burly mob members after losing a bet during a Russian Roulette match.
  - In part two, a businessman (Seth Meyers) calls his friend for the number of a Dutch man who can help him remove a Thai hooker who ended up dead after he had sex with her.
  - In the concluding part, Seth's businessman is on the phone with the Dutchman about the removal of a dead prostitute – but this time the prostitute is a male. Also joining the businessman is Affleck, wearing a pink robe, earrings, and makeup and asking the Dutchman (played by Darrell Hammond) if he's interested in buying panda meat, and a paranoid Kelly Ripa (in a cameo appearance) wielding a meat cleaver and exhorting the businessman to cut the prostitute up and put the remains in a bag.
- OnlySeniors – An elderly couple (Kenan Thompson and episode host Quinta Brunson) tell their kids they found life insurance that's reasonably priced and doesn't consider preexisting conditions. All they have to do is set up a web cam, get naked, and "do stuff to each other."
- Oops! I Crapped My Pants – A parody of ads for adult diapers (e.g. Depends) that also plays on the use of statements as product names (e.g. "I Can't Believe It's Not Butter!"). As the old man puts it: "How do I know so much about Oops! I Crapped My Pants? I'm wearing them right now, and I just did."
- Organization Overcompensating for Political Snubs (O.O.P.S!) — Days after the Republican Party suffered bad losses in the 2026 elections, this cut-for-time ad finds some of those losing GOP candidates (played by Jeremy Culhane, Andrew Dismukes, Ashley Padilla, and episode host Druski) asking for forgiveness but also not exactly apologizing for their nasty campaigns (says Dismukes' character, "A lot of stuff was said on both sides: He [his opponent] said I was out of touch with everyday Americans; I said his children weren't biologically his").
- The Original Kings of Catchphrase Comedy Tour – Ads for a live standup comedy tour that's "coming soon to bootleg DVD" and features comics who liberally rely on familiar catchphrases or antics to stand out.
  - The first ad includes "Beef Jelly" Winfield (Kenan Thompson), Goran "Funky Boy" Bogdan (Paul Brittain), and "Airhorn" Schultz (episode host Zach Galifianakis).
  - A second ad from Season 37 has the same comedians, but replaces "Airhorn" Schultz with Dirk "Jack Knife" Cane (episode host Charlie Day), a Dane Cook-esque comic known for a rude finger gesture known as "The Jack-Knife".
  - A third ad from later in Season 37 (though cut-for-time after dress rehearsal) features episode host Mick Jagger as Denny Cumberbatch, a flamboyant, Cockney British comedian (think Russell Brand) whose punchline is "A bit weird, innit?"
- Otezla – It's not a pill (though it looks like one), it's not a cream or injectable drug, and it appears to move through space and time. In fact, as spokeswoman Ashley Padilla overshares, it might be a specimen in its own right (as evidenced by security footage of Amgen's laboratory, where it appears to deform into a big, misshapen blob when left alone). But it is proven, just like its "mortal enemy" Skyrizi, to effectively treat plaque psoriasis, according to this ad from Ryan Gosling's 2026 hosting stint (the tagline: "Oh-oh-oh-Otezla--what do you mean, 'it's taken'?").
- Oxxon – The oil company blames the high production costs of their elaborately produced commercials as an excuse for high energy prices. A parody of Exxon's "Energy for a Strong America" campaign ("Energy for a gullible America" is the closing tagline here).
- Ozempic for Ramadan – The injectable drug for weight and hunger management is marketed to Muslims observing the farḍ of dawn-to-sunset fasting during the month of Ramadan. The tagline: "Yeah, it's just Ozempic."

== P ==
- Pan Am – Thanks to good security and low fares, it's a good time to fly because of their best offer: Fly to Brussels, Rome or London, you get to keep the plane you flew on. The closing tagline: "We're Pan Am... Help us."
- Pandora charms – For the woman "who makes the holidays merry and bright," the man in her life can give her assorted bracelet charms that acknowledge her various traits and interests (e.g. if she drinks coffee, a coffee cup; if she works as a nurse, a nurse's hat).
- Paperless Post – This e-invitation service isn't above nudging those who don't respond, thanks to features including Paperless Brick (thrown through a window), Paperless Horse's Head, Paperles Severed Finger, Paperless Their Car Explodes, and for those who complain on social media about receiving the invite, Paperless Wild Dogs. The end of this cut-for-time ad from Season 49 mentions it's sponsored by the United States Postal Service ("Send a physical invite they can't pretend they didn't see").
- Paul Ryan for President – Speaker of the House Ryan (Taran Killam) makes this presidential campaign ad to insist he's not running for the presidency ("I did not approve this message")... although if he were to do so, he'd run on a platform of cutting taxes, creating jobs, etc. A parody cut for time from an April 2016 episode.
- Paw Patrol – This ad starts out as a run-of-the-mill (and live-action) scene from the animated Nickelodeon series, with Mayor Goodway (Ego Nwodim) honoring the titular all-canine patrol for protecting Adventure Bay. But it's only an intro to an attack ad ("Paid for by cats") that endorses a recall election against Goodway. City Councilman Herb Tangier (episode host Oscar Isaac) and "concerned citizens" in the ad imply that putting trust in a force consisting solely of 6 dogs "can't protect a city the size of San Diego" from murders, carjackings, and other more serious crimes.
- Paxil—Second-Term Strength – An anti-depressant made especially for Barack Obama (Jay Pharoah) as he tries to deal with his second term as president and all of the scandals and failures (such as the Benghazi scandal, the IRS scandal, General Petraeus's sex scandal, and Obamacare). Also available in Republican Strength for John Boehner (Taran Killam) dealing with the stress of Tea Party members protesting against Obama's administration.
- Pelotaunt – Peloton's fitness equipment features streaming video classes with positive encouragement. But for exercise buffs desiring results through negative reinforcement, this fitness bike provides such "patented passive aggressive technology" as video instructors offering withering judgement instead of corny speeches; video screens with gaslighting statistics and camera views of your flabby butt; and comical music (specifically the theme from Curb Your Enthusiasm) rather than motivating melodies. As one user (Beck Bennett) puts it, "I feel mentally broken down, but, hey, I can see my abs."
- Penne alla Vodka – For every kind of celebration (graduations, weddings, funeral banquets, etc.), it's the pasta dish that's "loved by none, but tolerated by all."
- Pep Boys Genderflect campaign – Mirroring Starbucks' "#RaceTogether" campaign, which encouraged conversations about race between its employees and customers, the auto parts chain promotes its own initiative to discuss LGBTQ and gender identity issues. The mechanics and parts people, however, voice opinions on the subject that can be considered politically incorrect, much to their customers' discomfort.
- Pepto-Bismol Ice – The famous pink antacid is now available in malt liquor form so clubbers like Nasim Pedrad can "keep the party out of [their] pants" ("Pepto-Bismol Ice got me off the toilet and onto the dance floor!", remarks Pedrad).
- Petchow Rat Poison – In this takeoff on misleading labels, the formulation of Hank Petchow's (Will Ferrell) brand of rat poison makes it look like dog food, which almost fools his pet husky ("Down, boy! That's not for you!"); not helping matters is the fact that it's packaged in a 25 lb. bag with his last name in large print (stylized like "PetChow" instead of "Petchow"), a large photo of Petchow's husky (since he loves him that much), and the words "rat poison" printed in extremely tiny letters. The tagline: "The one they can't resist! (But they probably should.)"
- Philadelphia Action Figures – The acclaimed 1993 legal drama inspires this set of figures kids can use to create Masters of the Universe-style playtime adventures. Also featured is a Philadelphia video game from Sega Genesis (footage from Sega's port of Galaxy Force II is used as a stand-in).
- Phil Hartman Creations – You, too, can slip into any different character when donning a wig, as Hartman enjoys doing so at SNL ("You can change wigs as often as you change your mood!").
- The Phone Company – Episode host Lily Tomlin appears as her grouchy, apathetic operator character Ernestine, who relates the goings-on and imperfections of her equally indifferent employer, succinctly stating "We don't care. We don't have to. We're the Phone Company."
- Pier 1 Imports – In this November 2002 parody, Kirstie Alley (episode host Nia Vardalos) tells stressed businesswoman Rachel Dratch "you need shopping therapy" and forcefully drags her to Pier 1... excitable actions by the home decor chain's spokesperson that viewers are advised they should steer clear of ("Only you can protect yourself from Kirstie Alley").
- Pilates – Chloe Fineman and Molly Kearney walk into the dark, foreboding, and neon-hued world that is a pilates class in this horror movie trailer "from the creator of Saw X and marketing director for Alo" that features episode host Kristen Wiig as a menacing yet cheerful instructor and her Palm Royale co-star Kaia Gerber in a cameo.
- Pink Box – Gilda Radner has felt so confident since buying this nameless, mysterious product in plain pink packaging (and a black triangle its only marking), and is vague when tennis partner Laraine Newman questions what it is ("Is it welcomed protection against odor all year round?" Radner: "Possibly.")
- Pinx Period Underwear – Able to "hold up to 12 hours of you know what," this super-absorbent, eco-friendly underwear can help women keep their menstrual cycle discreet... even if animals can detect it (as happens to episode host Amy Schumer in this Season 48 ad).
- Plans – A Season 51 horror movie trailer centered on a couple (Ben Marshall and episode host Sabrina Carpenter) expecting to enjoy a quiet evening at home, only to forget about obligations for that same night that they made months ago with two unsettling relatives (Mikey Day and Sarah Sherman) who have a tendency to share online videos or talk endlessly.
- The Player-With-Yourself Club – Telly Savalas (Phil Hartman) promotes a discount card for chronic masturbators.
- Pocket Pal – Businessman Dan Aykroyd promotes "the last word in personal electronic systems," a device with "THOUSANDS of micro-processors, which electronically duplicate the sensing mechanisms of the silver-haired bat" and warns users of possible mid-air plane collisions... such as the one that puts Ackroyd and his fellow passengers into a panic ("We're gonna collide with a 747!!").
- Pongo! – A 4-legged, anamorphic pet that's "no mess, no bark, no bite," does very few tricks, is neither alive nor dead, and is no problem for parents who think their kids aren't ready to care for a real pet... until its unblinking eyes unnerve the mother of the family (Sarah Sherman) in this holiday toy ad from Season 49.
- Pornhub – A parody of the "we're here for you" outreach ads businesses produced early in the COVID-19 pandemic, with various adults indulging on the pornography website's content while sheltering at home.
- PottyPM – Promoting a device that allows the user to use the bathroom in the middle of the night without getting out of bed, this ad takes a turn halfway through when episode host Jennifer Lopez asks whether it's also made for women, a question pitchman Kyle Mooney responds to with clear unfamiliarity of the female anatomy.
- Powers Realty – The husband-and-wife real estate team of Burt and Blair Powers (Tim Robinson and Nasim Pedrad) promise that "WE! COME! THROUGH!" when helping you buy a home. But they have a simple request: Stop drawing "butts and wieners" on their billboards (where they're shown with their mouths open unnaturally wide).
- Pre-Chew Charlie's – A steakhouse for people with dentures, where the waiters (Gilda Radner, Laraine Newman, and episode host Chevy Chase) come to your table and chew your food for you. Bill Murray also appears as the PJ McWhiskers-like mascot Pre-Chew Charlie, who turns out to have dentures of his own.
- Pregnant in Heels – A promo for a Bravo reality series that follows Rosie Pope (Abby Elliott), a maternity concierge who provides expectant mothers with anything they want, no matter how extreme. For example, client Shoshanna Bunt (episode host Tina Fey) asks Rosie for a delivery room that's "total VIP" and a water birth that has Diet Coke instead of water.
- Preparation H – The hemorrhoidal ointment has been spoofed in a trio of ads:
  - The first, from the Season 27 premiere, features Jimmy Fallon and other skateboarding dudes talking of using the creme in urban slang ("MY RECTUM! MY RECTUM! MY RECTUM'S ON FIYAH!" "I'm about ta drop an H-BOMB on dis rizzoid!" "In whacked out cream or jiggity jiggity jelly!").
  - A second ad, from Season 41, finds Beck Bennett discreetly offering Preparation H Advanced Gel to fellow hemorrhoid sufferer Taran Killam, but later expecteds some sort of friendship from Killam in return, even if it means humiliating him in front of his fellow dinner guests ("Hey man, did that stuff I gave you help your butt?").
  - In a third ad, from Season 50, Flamin' Hot Cheetos mascot Chester Cheetah (voiced by Andrew Dismukes) advises that traditional Prep H's cooling relief is best when the "in-your-face flavor" of hot wings "really mess[es] up your butt." But fellow pitchman and "Flamin' Hot Freak" Stuart (episode host Jack Black) prefers Flamin' Hot Preparation H (20,000 Scoville units of heat in a dark red cream) to "fight fire with fire"... until instantly regretting doing so.
- President Barbie – The latest addition to the Barbie doll line, complete with sunglasses, smart phone, and a presidential seal-adorned podium. Much to Mattel's chagrin, however, girls feel ambivalent about it ("Feels like she's trying too hard," says one). A May 2016 commentary on, as HuffPost puts it, "a generation so progressive that the president's gender is irrelevant."
- Press Conference Play Set – For kids who find watching TV press conferences boring but want to get in on the act (or need to if they must discuss broken windows or unfinished dinners), there's this play set that features a podium, microphone, background curtain, and other things that make a press conference a press conference.
- Prince Charles Tells You How to Pick Up Girls! – The Prince of Wales (episode host Eric Idle) plugs his book that offers men Royal-related conversation openers and techniques designed to attract the opposite sex.
- Privolin – Angela (episode host Jennifer Aniston) constantly breaks the fourth wall at a business meeting (much to her colleagues' disgust) to tell viewers about this prescription medication that treats her genital herpes (as coworker Ana Gasteyer puts it, "She's talking to the wall about herpes medicine!"). Later on in the episode, when the show is going to commercial, Angela pops up in front of the SNL band and (silently) pitches Privolin again.
- Pug Wigs – Sonja and Damien Regulanté (Cecily Strong and episode host Jonah Hill) promote their specialty wig store where, with just the right kind of new hair style, any pug can look more refined and handsome. Also promoted is Dana Simpson's (Kenan Thompson) Boy Pug Beard & Goatee Salon.
- Punk'd: Barely Legal – Ashton Kutcher (episode host Justin Timberlake) releases a DVD of his Punk'd pranks that were never shown on TV due to legal issues, such as Fred Durst (Jeff Richards) getting mugged, Christina Aguilera (Maya Rudolph) suffering from morning sickness after Kutcher steals her birth control pills, and 50 Cent (Finesse Mitchell) shooting Dax Shepard (Will Forte) dressed as a vampire (which, to Kutcher, is a "double punk" because Dax didn't know he was going to get shot and Fiddy didn't know the vampire was Dax).
- Puppy Uppers and Doggie Downers – Gilda Radner complains to Laraine Newman that her dog Sparky has no energy, so Newman recommends Puppy Uppers. Later, when the dog is hyperactive (and quite a bit smaller), Radner complains that "Sparky's perked up a little too much", so Newman recommends dosing him with Doggie Downers.
- Purino Rat Chow – Garrett Morris and Gilda Radner are concerned about the rats in their slum apartment, but The Pied Piper (Chevy Chase) is there to promote this food that gives rats the nutrients they need.

== Q ==
- Quarry – Jane Curtin tastes "the only [breakfast] cereal that's pure 100% rocks and pebbles", parodying the glut of "natural", earthy, and crunchy (deafeningly, in this case) granola-based cereals popular in the mid-1970s. The tag line: "Better tasting, 'cause it's mined".
- The Quotable Caddyshack – Episode host Bill Murray, with a cameo assist from fellow Caddyshack star Chevy Chase, promotes a leather-bound version of the frequently quoted film's script, suitable for reference in everyday life (e.g. job interviews, wedding vows).

== R ==
- Racists for Trump – Airing in March 2016 during the heat of the Republican Party presidential primaries, this campaign ad features a cross section of "real Americans" expressing why they support candidate Donald Trump, from his being "a winner" and "authentic" to being "the only [candidate] who's actually created jobs." Only later are these voters revealed, without subtlety, to be Islamophobes, white supremacists, book burners, and outright Klansmen and Nazi sympathizers.
- RAD 3000 – Pitchman Spencer Mason (Chris Parnell) and NYFD officer Peter Venelli (Fred Armisen) promote this fire detector that can potentially save your life and get you moving to hit music of the 1980s. Also featured are Doctor Dré and Ed Lover (Kenan Thompson and Finesse Mitchell) promoting Yo! Fire Alarm Raps ("If you hear this [opening beats of "Bust a Move" play], be sure to bust a move outta yo house!").
- Random Duet Christmas Spectacular – Inspired by new generations discovering David Bowie's 1977 Christmas duet with Bing Crosby, Peacock creates a whole special of holiday tunes performed by such equally-peculiar pairings as Bob Dylan (James Austin Johnson) with Katy Perry (episode host Ariana Grande), Bruce Springsteen (Andrew Dismukes) with Bad Bunny (Marcello Hernández), and Lil Jon (Kam Patterson) with "SNL's Jane Wickline" (as herself).
- The Raunchiest Miss Rita – A promo for a spinoff of The Marvelous Mrs. Maisel finds Midge Maisel (episode host and Marvelous star Rachel Brosnahan) inspiring club housekeeper Rita Mae Johnson (Leslie Jones) to try standup comedy; Rita and her very-blue material become a spotlight-stealing hit.
- ReaganCo. – Charles Rocket demonstrates how you can show your patriotism by way of Ronald Reagan wallpaper, cosmetics, and bathroom tiles.
- The Real Housewives of Disney – Bravo promises "a whole new world… of drama!" in this promo for the latest addition to its reality TV franchise, this time focusing on the Disney Princesses and their lavish lifestyle.
- Rectrix – A "unique all-natural, fast-acting erectile dysfunction remedy" men can insert up their rectum.
- Red Flag Perfume – an ad promoting a Chanel fragrance for women whose behavior and life choices belie their elegant appearance. Jon Hamm is the narrator; Kristen Wiig portrays the woman who has, among other things, lived in Las Vegas for 11 years and previously dated a club promoter.
- The Regal Promenade Pavilion – A venue that "makes your wedding look like a wedding," featuring everything from exquisite decorations and elegant flatware to running-and-screaming 8-year-olds and stray balloons stuck in the air vent.
- Rick's Model Ts – A "promotional film" for the very first used car lot. Rick (Mike O'Brien) claims to be crazy for selling cars at such low prices, but wife Daisy (episode host Tina Fey) is clearly certifiably so ("I smashed a mirror 'cause I saw a woman in there who's crazy").
- Roach Brothel – Rid your home of pests via the irresistible lure of sex ("Roaches make out, but they don't check out").
- Roach-Ex Plus – Cockroaches don't stand a chance against this bug killer, especially in the hands of a jealous husband who uses it on a roach (episode host Don Cheadle) who had sex with his wife.
- Rock Bottom Kings – "However your (problem gambler) friend bottoms out, make sure you cash out" with this sports betting app that offers prop bets on how they'll lose it all (e.g. betting his child's college fund on the coin toss, caught faking his own death when he uses his phone to gamble).
- Romano Tours – Joe Romano (episode host Adam Sandler) promises beautiful tours of Italy but can't promise the vacationer will improve personally ("If you're sad now, you might still feel sad there, okay?").
- Ron and Donna Lacatza's Formal Emporium – Ron and Donna (Pete Davidson and Sarah Sherman) offer everything your daughter needs for her big winter formal, from elegant dresses to corsets "straight from the garden"... and, if parents are worried about their daughter engaging in after-party sexual intercourse, their dweeb son Donovan (Andrew Dismukes) as a date ("because Donovan wouldn't know when to start").
- Rosetta Stone – Users praise the CALL service in this 2013 ad, among them men who've picked up such Thai language phrases as "How much?" "Is that for the whole night?" and "Oh my God, what have I done?" The obvious allusions to Thailand's prostitution trade prompted an attempt by the country's culture minister to have the spoof removed from YouTube.
- Rosé Zone – Analogous to NFL RedZone, this channel features only the trashiest moments from all of reality television, so you don't have to sit through the not-so-raunchy parts ("It's blood lust for women").
- Royal Deluxe II – This 1977 car commercial parody demonstrates the smoothness of the car's ride by having a mohel perform a circumcision in the back seat while the car is driven at 40 MPH down a bumpy road.
- Rubik's Grenade – An easily-explosive parody of Rubik's Cube promotes what may be "the last puzzle you'll never solve".
- Rubik's Teeth – SNL acknowledges the then-eminent Rubik's Cube craze in this ad, centered around dental implants that also work as a Rubik's-like puzzle (as demonstrated by Joe Piscopo).
- Russell & Tate Law Firm – This spoof of ads for "ambulance-chasing" attorneys promotes a law firm whose partners are two intimidating black men (played by Tim Meadows and then-recent SNL hire Tracy Morgan) with extensive "resumés" who repeatedly pledge to "git yo' money".
- Russell Stover Black History Heart-Shaped Box – Valentine's Day coincides with Black History Month, making February the perfect time for white men to show their Black girlfriends that they both love them and honor their culture through this set of candies molded in the visages of noted black figures (and Bill Clinton).

== S ==
- SAC – "Designed by a team of eminent NORAD gynecologists," this "strategic airborne contraceptive" utilizes "a new heat-seeking process to destroy invaders" before they enter a woman's "space." A Season 10 ad featuring Julia Louis-Dreyfus and Gary Kroeger.
- SafeGuard Home Security System – This video security service helps apprehend burglars and intruders by sending influencers to interview them while they're breaking into homes, video that's uploaded to YouTube and social media where the perps can be easily identified.
- Safelite – In this Season 43 parody of testimonials for the auto glass repair company, Safelite glass repair technician Ken (played by Beck Bennett) makes repeated visits to a mother and daughter (Aidy Bryant and Melissa Villaseñor, respectively) to repair their minivan windshield. But it's discovered that Ken's been smashing the windshield each time, an obsession that leaves Mom infuriated. It also raised the real-life ire of Safelite, who called out the ad for bad taste on Twitter the next day ("Our techs are our heroes. #notcool"). The ad aired on SNL only once, the episode of October 7, 2017. By the time the episode was rerun on NBC the next month, the ad was pulled completely, replaced in the full-length on-air and online episode replays by another filmed segment (a rap video featuring Bennett, Kyle Mooney, and episode host Gal Gadot called "The Last Fry") that had been "cut for time" from the original broadcast.
- Salon – "Flamboyant" beauty salon operator David Spade pitches this hairspray that's activated by saying "salon" repeatedly (in the exaggerated French manner, with a sibilant 'S' and the accent on the first syllable). He teaches Victoria Jackson how to say it "properly".
- Samuel Adams Jack-O Pumpkin Ale – "Real Bostonians" sample this autumnal version of the popular Boston-brewed beer in this Season 46 ad, with most of them enjoying it... except for "Sean S." (episode host Bill Burr), who thinks it tastes disgusting but isn't above having more generous samples ("It's kinda sweet n' [expletive], but, you know, if there's nothin' else to drink…").
- Santi-Wrap – Rather than placing toilet tissue on Santa Claus' lap (as Laraine Newman initially does here), Dan Aykroyd recommends this "colorful, decorative and hygienic way to protect yourself" from germs part-time mall Santas carry, especially the jolly ol' elf in this setting (depicted by John Belushi as a liquor-swilling vagrant).
- Saturday Night Live compilation videos – Broadway Video's SNL compilations get the self-parody treatment in two ads from the 24th season's first two episodes:
  - The Best of the First 20 Minutes of Saturday Night Live, which posits that the best moments of any 90-minute SNL episode come from its first 20, specifically those from the Cameron Diaz-hosted season premiere on which this ad aired.
  - The Best of Horatio Sanz, which, since Sanz had joined the cast only a week earlier, is limited in content (e.g. walk-ons, goodnights) and has old skits from a Dan Aykroyd compilation as filler.
- Schmitt's Gay – in this spoof of beer companies' targeting of specific demographics, two housesitters (Chris Farley & Adam Sandler) are discouraged at the filthy condition of the backyard pool. When the water is turned on, however, it magically transforms into a sparkling clean pool filled with attractive, and presumably gay, men wearing bikini swim trunks, whom the housesitters merrily cavort with.
- Scrotox – A Botox-like male enhancement medication that is shot directly into the scrotum. As pitchman (and episode host) Alec Baldwin puts it, "Aren't you ready for your prunes to turn into plums?"
- Settl – As its name implies, this mobile dating app is aimed at women willing to settle for dates and relationships with, as user Sasheer Zamata puts it, "normal guys with characteristics I am now willing to overlook."
- Shake Weight Infomercial DVD – A DVD of what Salon called "TV's dirtiest ad" running "three times on a loop," and is disguised "in a variety of fake covers to keep your wife away."
- Shark Channel – While at first it promises to be "cable's only network to feature all-shark programming", the content turns into things like "The Shark Report" (images of sharks alongside a 5-day weather forecast graphic), a cooking show ("Tonight, Chef Ramona explores some creative ways to cook with chum"), general entertainment programs, and even a broadcast of the Country Music Association Awards. An October 1997 spoof of Discovery Channel's long-running, and oft-criticized, Shark Week programming block (the closing tagline: "We took the idea of a Shark Network… and ran with it").
- She's Got a D!%k – A trailer for a romantic comedy film starring episode host Justin Timberlake, who falls for a woman (played by Nasim Pedrad) who just happens to have a little extra plumbing downstairs.
- Shimmer – Married couple Gilda Radner and Dan Aykroyd argue over what this product is – she thinks it's a floor wax, he insists "It's a dessert topping, YOU COW!" Peacemaking Chevy Chase steps in and demonstrates that "new Shimmer is both a floor wax and a dessert topping!"
- Shirt in a Can – Tim Meadows gets upset after spilling blueberry cobbler on his dress shirt before a job interview ("DAMMIT!"). Fortunately there's this product he sprays on his person... even though it burns his skin and on-screen disclaimers include "not for prolonged contact" and "not for use on genital areas."
- Short & Curly – The shampoo men like Greg (Seth Meyers) use to keep their pubic hairs clean and shiny. Also promoted is Short, Dark, Curly, and Lovely, "but that, my friends, is strictly for the brothers".
- Sister Elder Care System — Highlighting the real-life gender discrepancies and personal costs seen in elderly care, this Season 52 ad promotes a round-the-clock, in-home — and free — service men can rely on for their aged or ailing parents: Simply text your sister (e.g. "Dad fell") and she'll drop everything to tend to them while, as a brother played by episode host John Mulaney states it, "I can get back to my life, and the stuff I like to do."
- Skechers – On the week Kanye West was denied entry into its headquarters, Skechers employees state the footwear company's "zero tolerance against antisemitism," remarks of which the rapper and business mogul has expressed (which caused Adidas to sever its collaboration with West). At the same time, though, they find it pretty cool that West even considered working with Skechers. But when one employee (played by Bowen Yang) opines "I'm sure Kanye will find a morally dubious company to work with instead," the ad cuts to My Pillow CEO Mike Lindell (James Austin Johnson), a promoter of debunked COVID-19 treatments and election fraud claims, announcing his own company's new tie-in with West.
- Sleepy Boy 2000 – Tim Kazurinsky purchases this do-it-yourself kit that, when assembled, creates a weapon that detects and destroys cars whose alarms go off in the middle of the night, enabling him to get a good night's sleep.
- The Smurfs – NBC follows up its slew of critically acclaimed epic miniseries with one based on Peyo's famed comic strip ("It's a story as timeless as the Bible and as old as The A-Team"), complete with a bombastic re-arrangement of the Smurfs theme sung by self-proclaimed "greatest singer in the world" Celine Dion (Ana Gasteyer). The cast features episode host Garth Brooks as Hefty, Sean Connery (Darrell Hammond) as Papa Smurf, Al Pacino (Chris Kattan) as Grouchy ("Now I'm gonna smurf ya somethin', I'm just gettin' smurfed up!"), and Helena Bonham Carter (Rachel Dratch) as Smurfette ("I want you to smurf all over my smurfs!").
- Sofa King – This furniture store ad features a family of apparent Middle Eastern origins and thick accents who promote their inventory with the adjective "Sofa King" (as in, "It's Sofa King comfortable!"), but the term audibly comes across as if "so fucking" is said.
- The Sopranos Diaries – After adapting Sex and the City prequel The Carrie Diaries into a TV series, The CW does the same with The Sopranos, projecting Tony (Bobby Moynihan) and his "family" as high school students in the early 1980s, rad outfits and all.
- Southwest Airlines – One month after cancelling over 15,000 flights nationwide (a December 2022 crisis blamed mostly on its antiquated scheduling systems), Southwest seeks to make amends with new technology ("upgrading" to 2008 Dell computers), more employees (they all used to work at Waffle House), and better conveniences (new lounges inside "any active Starbucks"). But the onus is still on passengers, in particular a new baggage system that sorts luggage destinations by color (blue to Charlotte, red to Dallas). As air concierge Heidi Gardner reminds customers, "You bought a Southwest ticket. You obviously don't respect yourself, so why should we?"
- Space Mistakes – Promoted as being on par with other cinematic space epics such as Gravity and The Martian, this film dramatically depicts what happens when astronauts makes rather innocuous mistakes in space (e.g. cracked helmets, unfastened seat belts at launch).
- Sparkle of the Sea – In this March 2026 ad, Lieke and Guus (Chloe Fineman and episode host Harry Styles) promote the cruise line's array of European entertainment acts, including "slow R&B [German] superstar" Jurgen Sex-Muller (James Austin Johnson); magician Felix Flourish (Mikey Day); French Def Jam comedian Jean K. Jean (Kenan Thompson, reprising a character last seen in 2013); and City Vogue Machine, a Polish duo who may not know English but do sing English songs phonetically.
- Speed – Veteran SNL writer Anne Beatts makes a rare on-screen appearance as a housewife able to happily multi-task, thanks to a diet pill you don't have to be overweight to use. Obtainable from your doctor, your neighbor's doctor, your college roommate's doctor, etc.
- Spice Girls — The English pop music group appeared in a trio of PSAs from 1998:
  - In January, Baby (Molly Shannon), Ginger (Ana Gasteyer), Sporty (Cheri Oteri), Scary (Chris Kattan), and Posh (episode host Sarah Michelle Gellar) warn of the dangers of smallpox and rheumatoid arthritis
  - In September, Baby, Sporty, Scary, and Posh (the latter here played by episode host Cameron Diaz) give advice for expectant mothers, e.g. don't pierce the baby when you're getting a belly ring, don't name the baby Ginger (since Ginger had by then left the group)
- Spirit Halloween – When communities face financial and economic hardship, the seasonal costume retailer is there to fill empty store spaces and provide jobs to the unemployed... for 6 weeks anyway.
- Spitzer and Associates – Following his resignation as Governor of New York, after his money laundering and dalliances with high-priced call girls were revealed in a criminal investigation, Eliot Spitzer (Bill Hader) promotes his private legal practice that deals with embarrassing sex-related issues. A cold-open sketch from Season 33.
- Spotlightz Acting Camp for Serious Kids – Two ads from Season 39 promote a camp where still-very-bright-eyed child actors can hone their talents by recreating adult-oriented film and TV work (e.g. Training Day, Breaking Bad, The Wolf of Wall Street).
- Spray-On Laetril – Peggy (Mary Gross) can't go to the prom due to her lung cancer ("I smoke about six packs a day, and frankly, my lungs look like moldy spinach"). Thankfully, she uses this new version of Laetril ("available in 'the pump!'"), and she's good to go... even though it can't do anything for her syphilis ("We here at Tijuana Laboratories may not have the answer to all your medical problems... but we’re working on it").
- Sproingo – This erectile dysfunction treatment works in concert with the male body by making "a sensuous, audible tone" (i.e. a cartoonish spring sound effect) at the onset of erection.
- Spud Beer – "Filled with the full, rich flavor of potatoes", this beer is "brewed for people who can't taste the difference", in this case an electroshock subject (writer Alan Zweibel). The end tagline: "Spud! The beer that made Boise famous!"
- A Stab at Love – Hallmark Channel ("where 'boo!' means 'boyfriend'") presents "a horror film for the whole family" that finds New York writer Kelsey (Chloe Fineman) returning to her home town of Autumn Hollow and meeting cute with an old classmate (episode host Nate Bargatze) who's also, admittedly and openly, a serial killer.
- St. Andrew's Center for Shivering Girls – For just $1 a day, you can provide "giant, broken-in men's sweatshirts for single girls [aged 18–29] who get cold easy" and have no boyfriend they can borrow from. Featuring Heidi Gardner, Ego Nwodim, and episode host Megan Thee Stallion, this Season 48 send-up spoofs charitable organizations that serve the poor, homeless, and others in dire need of basic necessities.
- Stanx – From the makers of Spanx comes this undergarment that, rather than let embarrassing flatulence pass out of the body (as normal underwear would do), traps it inside the lining... even though the gas buildup creates an abnormally big bulge around the buttocks.
- Starbucks Verismo Home Brewing System – This parody of Starbucks' single-serve coffee maker recreates the experience of ordering at Starbucks, including getting the "order" wrong (it brews tea when you wanted latte), misspelling the name on the mug ("Amorfa" instead of "Marcia"), and leaving broken stir sticks and sugar packs on the counter. The January 2013 ad, in its spoofing of Starbucks' baristas, generated calls of racism and classism in its depictions of both Verismo and Verquonica, the latter "a larger non-functioning machine" that only talks smack with Verismo about the user.
- Star Trek: Ego Quest – Paramount+ promotes an upcoming addition to the Star Trek franchise, a series that follows the voyages of the S.S. New Shepard; it's cowboy-hatted captain, Amazon founder Jeff Bezos (episode host Owen Wilson); and a "crew of random weirdos" making contact with the likes of Virgin Galactic's Richard Branson (Alex Moffat) and SpaceX's Elon Musk (Mikey Day).
- Star Wars: The Force Awakens – "There is an alliance of heroes: the new… and the old." So says the start of this advance teaser for the film from Season 40 that emphasizes the "old" part of that equation (e.g. Han Solo losing his hearing, Luke Skywalker using a lightsaber walker, handicapped plates on the Millennium Falcon).
- Star Wars: The Force Awakens Toys & Action Figures – Toys based on the film that are "great for everyone ages 6 and up – way up" (i.e. adult-age sci-fi geeks).
- State Farm Insurance – This Season 48 parody of the "Jake from State Farm" ad campaign finds Jake (played here by episode host Michael B. Jordan) helping a couple (Mikey Day and Heidi Gardner) with their insurance needs. But Jake's playful bond with the wife and kids frightens the husband to the point that he looks online for better rates from GEICO and almost jumps off a bridge in a drunken stupor (only to be rescued by Doug and LiMu Emu from Liberty Mutual).
- Steve Martin's All-Natural Penis Beauty Cream (New Formula) – a parody of the celebrity infomercial boom.
- Stevie Nicks Fajita Roundup – This October 1998 ad finds the singer (episode host Lucy Lawless) reworking Fleetwood Mac tunes (e.g. "Rhiannon," "Dreams") to promote her new Mexican restaurant in Sedona, Arizona.
- Straight Male Friend – For gay men seeking friendships other than those with overly dramatic straight women, "low-effort, low-stakes" friendships with straight men (as Bowen Yang exhibits here with episode host Travis Kelce) require no emotional commitment or financial investment... and apart from occasional video game-related outbursts, results in no drama. A Season 48 spoof of pharmaceutical ads ("available everywhere except therapy").
- Stranger Things – "This is our Star Wars!" So admits Netflix as they promote "sequels, prequels, re-quels, and spinoffs" of the popular, recently concluded supernatural series that put "our Hawkins heroes" in new situations that include:
  - Strangerous Minds, in which Steve Harrington (Andrew Dismukes) teaches at an inner-city Los Angeles high school
  - The Wheeler Report, with Nancy Wheeler (Chloe Fineman) covering "some of the biggest crimes of the 1990s" (e.g. the O. J. Simpson chase)
  - Mike in Manhattan, where Mike Wheeler (episode host Finn Wolfhard) launches a writing career in New York City and breezily chitchats about the dating life with friends Dustin and Lucas (Gaten Matarazzo and Caleb McLaughlin, like Wolfhard reprising their Stranger Things characters)
  - Will Byers (Jeremy Culhane), who does not receive a spinoff because his coming out scene is still ongoing (a parody some Stranger fans thought was in poor taste)
  - Mike's dad (Mikey Day), from whose "insignificant" point-of-view the entire series is retold in Stranger Things: Oops! All Mike's Dad
  - The long-suggested (and confirmed-as-nonexistent) 9th episode to the 8-episode final season that finds Mike, Dustin, and Lucas discovering Eleven (Kenan Thompson) in Iceland
- Stunt Performers Association of America – This PSA from Season 46 finds a pentet of motion picture stunt performers recreating action moves from the safety of home, while encouraging fans to also take precautions during the COVID-19 pandemic. The group includes a trio of action stunt artists (Mikey Day, Ego Nwodim, and Chris Redd), and two stunt performers (Aidy Bryant and Kate McKinnon) whose forte is slapstick comedy in children's movies.
- Sub Shack – A spoof of the Subway ad campaign that featured Jared Fogle (played here by Jimmy Fallon), with customers of the fast-food restaurant gaining weight rather than losing it.
- Sugar Free Zing – Taste tester Laraine Newman, after trying both of them blindfolded, chooses sugar free Zing over a glass of phlegm.
- Sugar Frosted Anabolic Steroids – Episode host Fran Tarkenton says that, as a football player, he needs a lot of strength and stamina. That's why he eats Sugar Frosted Anabolic Steroids every morning, which gives him "more [male hormones] than [his] body would produce in three years"... even though both his wife (Jane Curtin) and kids grew long beards after eating it.
- The Sunday National Enquirer – The supermarket tabloid markets to those who want to spend their Sundays reading celebrity gossip instead of highbrow journalism in this spoof of subscription offers for The New York Times' Sunday editions.
- Super Bass-O-Matic '76 – This parody of Ronco ads features Dan Aykroyd pureeing raw bass fish in a blender, as well as Laraine Newman delivering the happy pitch line, "Wow, that's terrific bass!" Akroyd and Newman would reprise the ad (for the "Super Bass-O-Matic 2150") during SNL's 40th anniversary special in 2015.
- Super Bowl XXXVII – Shown during SNL's 2003 "halftime special" (which spoofed American Idol) and framed as an example of comedy that a Sisqó-like Dean Edwards shows to Simon Cowell (Chris Parnell), this ad finds Don Cheadle (Edwards) talking about how much he loves going to the Super Bowl. But he's not supposed to, as evidenced by the closing tagline ("He's been out there way too long"). Cowell disapproves, and the talent shifts to "the Poehler twins".
- Super Feud – "When two of South America's biggest singing stars have a feud, you're the winner." So says announcer Don Pardo in introducing this "special TV offer" for a compilation album of music from Jorge Montenero (episode host Patrick Swayze) and Raul Valendez (Dana Carvey), who sing about their bitter rivalry (e.g. fan mail volume, plastic surgery claims) to the tune of "Guantanamera."
- Suppressex – an anti-arousal medicine taken to prevent erections from occurring at inopportune moments. As episode host (and former SNL cast member) Tracy Morgan explains, it's perfect for such low-key activities as church, yoga class, and "watching old ladies suck on grapes".
- Swiffer Sleepers – Mom Amy Poehler uses these blanket sleeper-sized cleaning cloths to pick up dust and dirt wherever her kids crawl, roll, or jump around their house ("Who says sweeping floors can't be fun?").
- Swiftamine – A medication designed to fight bouts of vertigo caused by the realization that you enjoy Taylor Swift's music.
- Swill – Bill Murray extols the qualities of this putrid mineral water "dredged from Lake Erie", the packaging of which looks nearly identical to Perrier. A highlight is the slow pouring of Swill from the bottle, set to the refrain of Carly Simon's "Anticipation", a song used to promote another slow-pouring food item at the time, Heinz Ketchup.

== T ==
- Taco Town – A spoof of Taco Bell and their complicated menu items (i.e., the Crunchwrap Supreme), selling a new taco with layer after layer of the outer crust, finished with a Chicago-style pizza and blueberry pancake, and "deep-fried to perfection". "Pizza?" Andy Samberg says of the product. "Now that's what I call a taco!"
- Talarico for Congress/Frankel for Congress – This quartet of attack ads from a November 2002 episode plays upon the "Call (opponent) and tell them to stop" cliche common in attack ads at the time:
  - The first is for Andrew Talarico (Chris Kattan), whose message is straightforward: call Ellen Frankel (Rachel Dratch) and tell her to stop spinning lies about Talarico supposedly having voted to privatize social security.
  - The second is for Frankel, who commands viewers to call Talarico and tell him to stop commanding viewers to call Frankel about her mentioning Talarico's social security privatization vote.
  - The third is for "Fairness in Negative Attack Ads", claiming that Talarico didn't do anything related to the privatization of social security and saying that Frankel should stop telling viewers to call Talarico about her.
  - The final one is for Verizon, telling viewers to call Talarico's home phone ("Tell him that disconnecting his phones is unfair to Ellen Frankel").
- Tampax Secrets – A cut-for-time ad from Season 45 finds Aidy Bryant, Melissa Villaseñor, and episode host Phoebe Waller-Bridge using these tampons that are hidden in containers made to look like less embarrassing items (dog poop, a dead mouse, etc.), all the better to not let bystanders know they have to get up and care for their period.
- Target – Two ads for the department store chain that has everything you need for Thanksgiving:
  - A November 2016 ad highlights an array of food, cookware, and home decor... as well as a nice, spacious parking lot where you can sit in your car and gather your bearings if you're meeting your family for the first time since that month's election.
  - A November 2021 ad acknowledges that hosting your family "can be… a whole damn thing." For that, there are discounts on such items as Nate's Humane Tofurkey Loaf (to satisfy your sister's vegetarian boyfriend), Apple noise-cancelling earbuds ("for when Grandpa weighs in on social issues"), and various wines and beers (to get through conversations about cryptocurrency, recently deceased relatives, etc.).
- Tasty Toaster Tarts – Teenager Jason (episode host Chance the Rapper) unloads a bevy of sugary treats from the kitchen cupboard for him and his friends (Mikey Day, Heidi Gardner, and Melissa Villaseñor) to snack on after school. After Jason's friends inquire how his strict parents allowed him to stock up on so much sweet stuff, they notice suspicious signs (e.g. bloodstains, a fridge wrapped in duct tape) that Jason may have done something rash. All is good, however, when Jason produces this Pop Tarts-like product (its tagline: "Keeps Kids Happy").
- Tayster's Choice Spermicidal Jelly – A trio of ads spoofing the Taster's Choice campaign centered on a couple who have a slow-burning romance over the coffee. Here, a woman (episode host Sharon Stone) asks her neighbor (Dana Carvey) to borrow the spermicide being advertised.
- Teacher PSA – Sponsored by OnlyFans and timed with the end of the school year, this May 2024 PSA finds teachers (various SNL castmembers and episode host Maya Rudolph) surrendering and saying "y'all won" to the pupils who still don't know how to read, pull humiliating pranks, get into fights, and have forced one teacher (played by Ego Nwodim) to create a new word: TSIDDAHN (which means "Sit down!").
- Tech-Pack – At the airport, Jason Sudeikis shows harried fellow traveler Kristen Wiig a new wearable pouch system that can hold and activate one's electronic devices (mp3 players, PDAs, cellphones, etc.) with a joystick... but also tends to scare other passengers because of its uncanny resemblance to a suicide belt. The closing tag line: "You'll be blown away."
- Teddy Bear Holding a Heart – Will Forte gives sweetheart Amy Poehler this "perfect way to say 'our love is eternal.'" Even though it's literally a teddy bear holding a heart (it's still attached to the box it came in), and is available anywhere (book stores, Hallmark's, drug stores, Wal–Mart, 7-Eleven, "I'm guessing wherever you buy milk."), Poehler accepts it and shows it off as if it were expensive jewelry. An exquisitely lensed spoof of ads for jewelers (e.g. De Beers) and retailers who heavily promote their wears as the perfect way to show true love on Valentine's Day.
- Teens Raising Awareness About Awful Parent Drivers (T.R.A.A.A.P.D.) – Teenager Samantha Samuels (episode host Taylor Swift) states in this PSA that while texting and driving by teens is dangerous, parents' own behaviors behind the wheel can be worse, i.e. when Mom and Dad (Kristin Wiig and Jason Sudeikis) drive while lecturing, balancing hot coffee, giving the birds-and-bees talk, etc.
- Teeny Tiny Statement Pin – Microscopic badges and buttons that express messages on political and social issues (or just vague imagery), so VIPs can make a statement while still letting their red carpet looks speak louder.
- Teeny Weenies – Ana Gasteyer, Cheri Oteri and Molly Shannon shill a home fertility kit that lets the user produce babies by, according to the jingle, "doing the shakey shakey dance" in this 1998 ad.
- Tel-e-link – This 2003 ad features people explaining the many features of a Tel-e-link phone as if the technobabble they're spouting is simple.
- Testicules – Andy Samberg and his scent turn lots of heads in this cut-for-time fragrance ad parody from Season 39, thanks to this "cologne for 'down there.'"
- Texxon – The petroleum conglomerate was featured twice in Season 8:
  - A full-length ad touts Texxon's philanthropic efforts, i.e. funding community centers, medical clinics, and job training programs. But the ad degenerates into thinly veiled threats that those benefits will vanish if legislative and regulatory attempts don't go their way. "Do what we say," they warn, "and nobody gets hurt."
  - Texxon was also sponsor of Ted Koppel's (Joe Piscopo) coverage of the Buckwheat assassination ("Life goes on, and Texxon is there"). When Buckwheat's death is announced, the Texxon tagline receives an add-on: "Life goes on, and Texxon is there. Because Buckwheat would have wanted it that way."
- That's Not Yogurt! – A spoof of "I Can't Believe It's Not Butter!" ads and the TCBY frozen-yogurt chain. (Note: TCBY's acronymic name was originally supposed to stand for "This Can't Be Yogurt!" but was later revised to stand for "The Country's Best Yogurt".) After eating the product, a couple (Victoria Jackson and Kevin Nealon) becomes very concerned about what the mysterious product actually is, but the coy announcer refuses to tell them. "From the makers of Those Aren't Olives!"
- Them Trumps – A promo for a show "from the producers of Empire" that ponders what would happen if Donald Trump and his family were black. Centering on President "Darius Trump" (Kenan Thompson), the tease finds Darius supremely confident in the face of criminal investigation and sexual scandal ("They can't lock me up!"), but quickly capitulating to the consequences when the feds storm in ("And even though I may be black—" "Freeze, Trump! You're under arrest!" "Yeah, that sounds about right.").
- thirtysomething Cereal – "From the makers of Teenage Mutant Ninja Turtles Cereal" comes this breakfast food made for the baby boomer/yuppie generation. It has "no fat, no sugar, no salt," and is made in images of characters from the angst-laden ABC drama ("I got an oat bran Elliot").
- This is U.S. – a promo for an NBC series that depicts life in the Trump administration as an emotional family drama, a la This Is Us, with characters including White House Press Secretary Sarah Huckabee Sanders (Aidy Bryant), presidential advisor Kellyanne Conway (Kate McKinnon) and HUD secretary Ben Carson (episode host, and This Is Us cast member, Sterling K. Brown).
- Thomas Peepers Insurance – An insurance company that keeps an eye on their clients' safety and well-being – literally, as evidenced by agent Bill Hader peeping through the windows of one client's home (only to be caught by spotlights and police sirens).
- Tidy Care Kitty Litter – As James Austin Johnson notes in his voiceover, this cat litter's crystals turn green when a cat is healthy and orange when there may be a health concern. But when it turns blue, it leads to arguments between a cat-loving couple (Ashley Padilla and episode host Matt Damon) and their son (Andrew Dismukes) over who else may be doing their business in the litter box.
- Tim and Meat's One-Stop Rocky Horror Shop – Tim Curry and Meat Loaf (both appearing as themselves) are proprietors of a store with props and costumes based on and to wear and use for midnight screenings of the 1975 cult film The Rocky Horror Picture Show.
- Timecrowave – In this infomercial spoof, inventor Gram Lampton (episode host Alec Baldwin) promotes a microwave oven that sends fully cooked food back in time to when you knew you were hungry – despite a self-evident risk of temporal paradoxes arising.
- Tiny Ass Bag – Designer purses, luggage, backpacks, and carry-on handbags that are just the right size if all you want to put in them are one AirPod, one Altoid, or secrets "and that's it!"
- Tinyballs – A trailer for a film "from the makers of Moneyball" about a Billy Beane-like GM (Taran Killam) who, instead of using sabermetrics to build a better baseball team, relies on a suspicious-looking man (episode host Ben Stiller) to inject strength – literally, through steroids – into his inept club, unhealthy side effects notwithstanding.
- Todd Foxworthy: You Might Be a Gay Redneck If... – This promo from Season 30 introduces Jeff Foxworthy's stereotypically gay half-brother (Johnny Knoxville), whose homosexually-themed stand-up comedy is collected on this DVD. As one review from "Hotlanta Pride Guide" sums his act up, "It's like if someone rolled Sean Hayes in cornmeal and fried him in an iron skillet."
- Toilet Death Ejector – This ad posits that the greatest embarrassment of senior citizens is being found dead on the toilet. As pitched by episode host John Mulaney, this mechanized device helps alleviate those fears. If the user feels they're about to die, they can press a button on the toilet, which projects them through the air and onto their bed. The device not only flushes the toilet automatically, but also drops a book next to the user (to let those discovering their corpse believe they died wise).
- Tom Brady's Falafel City – "Sim, Sim, Saladin, folks!" greets episode host Tom Brady as he promotes his restaurant in South Plainfield, New Jersey that serves only Middle Eastern cuisine (♪♫ "There's no burgers, fries or weenies/just tabbouleh and tahini" ♪♫).
- Tortumatic – A device Charles Rocket demonstrates as the ultimate way to show others that you can take the pain... by getting punched repeatedly by a number of boxing gloves and slamming his hand with a mallet.
- Totino's Pizza Rolls – A series of commercials (described by Rolling Stone as "the Totino's Pizza Rolls Cinematic Universe") airing over three straight Super Bowl weekends in the mid-2010s focusing on a dutiful housewife (Vanessa Bayer) serving Pizza Rolls to "my hungry guys" watching the big game in the living room.
  - The first ad, from 2015, promotes the "Totino's Super Bowl Activity Pack," featuring games and toys specifically made "for grown women ages 5 and up" (e.g. puzzles, play money, miniature top) that the wife can play to keep herself occupied in the kitchen while the hubby (episode host J. K. Simmons) and the guys (Bobby Moynihan, Beck Bennett, and Jay Pharoah) watch the game.
  - The second ad, from 2016, starts as a straight-up Super Bowl-themed Pizza Rolls ad, complete with the "hungry guys" (Bennett, Pharoah, Kyle Mooney, Pete Davidson, Jon Rudnitsky, and episode host Larry David) reacting to the big game in unison ("Go go go go go go! Touchdown! No no no no no no! Aww, fumble!"). But the wife discovers that the TV isn't even on (it's just a blank screen), and when she fearfully grabs a pair of scissors for self-defense, the guys turn around all at once, revealing icy stares with solid black eyes ("No. No. No. No. No. No. Aww. Fum. Ble."). The end-of-ad twist: It's actually a promotion for the recently revived TV series The X-Files.
  - The third ad, from 2017, gets really steamy: When one of the guys' (Alex Moffat) sister (played by episode host Kristen Stewart) comes into the kitchen to help, the wife finds herself attracted to the woman, and the two engage in torrid intercourse, using the Pizza Rolls on their bodies and speaking in French, thus giving real meaning when husband Stephen (Bennett) asks how they're "making out" in the kitchen. Moynihan, Mooney, and Mikey Day play the other guys.
- Tourism Board of Africa – This Season 46 ad positions the continent as "the #1 [travel] destination for divorcees of a certain age." The live skit features background beach views of strapping, shirtless men; suggestive double entendres ("The mountains, the ranges… the rhythm, the pounding"); and testimonials/invitations from a trio of divorced women played by Kate McKinnon, Heidi Gardner, and episode host Adele (who breaks into giggles several times).
- Trapped in the Closet 2: Still Trapped in the Closet – R. Kelly (Finesse Mitchell)'s famed musical soap opera gets spoofed in this November 2005 ad. Chapters 14 through 28 depict some rather bizarre storylines; for instance, Chapter 26 reveals that Gwendolyn (episode host Eva Longoria) broke up with Kelly and married a space alien (Kenan Thompson), who just so happens to be Kelly's father.
- Transportation Security Administration – Feeling lonely and wanting a little "human interaction" during the holiday season? How about going through a TSA airport security check, where you can receive a physical pat-down if you refuse full-body scanning ("It's our business to touch yours"). A Season 36 parody of suggestive ads for escort services.
- Tremfalta – A medication that treats irritable bowel syndrome by slowing the digestive process, which increases the intensity of bowel movements. This is evidenced by the literal stink left by a mother (episode host Carey Mulligan) in the restroom of her son's school music recital after taking Tremfalta, much to the disgust of janitor Kenan Thompson and principal Aidy Bryant.
- Tres Equis – Two Season 38 parodies of Dos Equis beer and its "Most Interesting Man in the World" campaign find "The Son of the Most Interesting Man in the World" (episode host Joseph Gordon-Levitt) living large ("He has multiple parody Twitter accounts"), impressing the ladies ("He can make a woman cringe, just by entering a room"), and enjoying beer that's "one equis better than my dad's beer, because he was never there for me." It leads to a father-son spat with The Most Interesting Man himself (played by Jason Sudeikis) in the second ad.
- Tressant Suprème – Kelly Ripa spoofs the numerous hair coloring ads in which she has appeared. Here, Ripa prefers Tressant Suprème because it contains "just a little bit of crack cocaine", thus explaining her well-known "peppy" persona.
- Trilocaine – A scalp-itch medication with extremely disturbing side effects (e.g. "90% of users experience an instantaneous and horrifying sleep paralysis containing a bleak vision of mortality").
- Triopenin – Shown during the first Weekend Update, this ad promotes an arthritis medication in a bottle that, due to its child-proof cap, is virtually impossible to open.
- Triple-Trac Razor – When this ad was written for SNL's first episode, men's razors hadn't progressed past two blades. But this three-blade razor (the first two grab the whisker, the third actually makes the cut) promises to leave men's faces "as smooth as a billiard ball." The bet here is that "you'll believe anything" you see in razor ads.
- Truck You, You Truckin' Truck – An ad for a CD of "42 songs all about truckin'" recorded by Johnny Goblin (episode host Jake Gyllenhaal) and "available only at Love's trucks stops along I-40."
- Trump Addicts of America – Supporters of Joe Biden in the 2020 presidential election express clear disdain for incumbent Donald Trump ("He's historically bad for the country," says one). But they're also concerned that if Biden wins, the next four years will feel different (i.e. less angrier) without an endless stream of bad news and worse actions from Trump and his administration. The closing tag line: "You know [Trump's] bad for you, but it's hard to imagine life without him."
- T.T. and Mario – Two ads promoting CD collections of the rauncy yet romantic song stylings of a 1970s-era Peaches and Herb-type singing duo played by Maya Rudolph and Kenan Thompson:
  - The Best of T.T. and Mario (Season 30), featuring "Let Me See Them," "Booty So Tight," and other songs that describe bizarre and gross sexual acts.
  - Married Too Long (Booty in the Rearview) (cut for time from Season 49), which features a reunited T.T. and Mario singing tunes about wanting to make love at the most inopportune of times, among them "An Appointment for Sex," "Let's Take a Bath Together," and "Boom" (noted as being from the soundtrack to Oppenheimer but actually played in theater lobbies after the film ends).
- Turlington's Lower Back Tattoo Remover – Back tattoos can look rather unfitting on one's body when it starts to sag (as an example, one tat reading "Pretty Lady" turns into "Pretty Sad", to which Dr. Edward Turlington (Chris Parnell) says "Pretty sad indeed."). Luckily, Turlington has concocted a product that, "when applied once every hour for 72 straight hours", slowly burns away unwanted lower back tattoos. "That tingling means it's working!" The closing tagline: "Because it won't be cool forever".
- Turtle Shirt – Men's shirts that are made from the same materials as a turtle's shell, allowing the wearer to hide from unwanted or embarrassing situations.
- Twinings Extreme – "An English athlete needs an English sports drink," hence this line of tea designed to help assure peak athletic performance. Flavors include "English Breakfast XL" (to refuel), "Darjeeling Octane" (to replenish), and "Earl Grey RX" (to recover and "be at my best for 3 to 5 days of a cricket match"). Episode host Emma Thompson is featured in this cut-for-time ad from 2019.
- Tylenol B.M. – a laxative product shown to cause you to defecate while you sleep.
- Tylenol Extreme − a variant of Tylenol that helps relieve self-induced testicular pain.

== U ==
- Uber Eats Wrapped – Just as Spotify employs a user's metrics to deliver them a personalized summary of their activity over the past year, Uber Eats gathers data on customers' top restaurants and menu items, money spent, and even pick-up photos to determine their rankings and "Uber Eats age"... much to those users' embarrassment. Less than 48 hours after this Season 51 parody aired, Uber would unveil "Youber," an actual personalized summary of users' year-in-review stats.
- Ultimate Fighting Championship – One weekend after Celine Dion and her song "It's All Coming Back to Me Now" were featured in an NBC Sunday Night Football introduction, the singer (episode host Ariana Grande) reworks the same song to hype up the mixed martial arts series, in particular its upcoming UFC 308 event ("♪♫ When I hit you like this/And you hit me like that ♪♫").
- Uncle Jemima's Pure Mash Liquor – With references to Uncle Remus in Disney's Song of the South, this subtle barb at products that perpetuate racial stereotypes finds Aunt Jemima's husband (Tracy Morgan) promoting liquor that's "more fun than pancakes" thanks to its 95% alcohol content by volume ("That means you get f***ed up for less money!").
- Undercover Office Potty – Beck Bennett needs to use the bathroom but is facing a big work deadline. Luckily, he can use "the only toilet that looks like a lamp, so you can go whenever you want and no one has to know." That is, until his colleagues become suspicious about multiple lamps on his desk... and notice the stench coming from them.
- Under Underground Rock Festival – A series of commercials which poke fun at the crazy promotions at alternative concerts, crazy special guests, as well as the extremes people will go to defy conformity. Done in the style of Gathering of the Juggalos infomercials.
- Uneek Kutz Barbershop – This Season 51 ad promotes Black-owned barbershops as an effective, and less-expensive, mental health therapy service for white men.
- Unforgivable: Natalie Cole Sings with All Her Dad's Dead Old Friends – Shortly after Cole's album Unforgettable... with Love, which featured her adding her vocals to her late father Nat King Cole's songs, blew up the charts, this 1992 ad finds Cole (Ellen Cleghorne) dueting with more deceased singers, including Sammy Davis Jr. (Tim Meadows), Ethel Merman (Julia Sweeney), a not-dead-yet Tammy Wynette (Melanie Hutsell) and Elvis Presley at two stages in his life (a younger Elvis played by Rob Schneider and an older Elvis played by episode host John Goodman).
- United Tings of Aubrey – Are you a woman who has dated, or even interacted with, Drake? Has the musician's mention of you in one of his songs, or at least his including your name in an album interlude, left you exploited? Then join "the thousands of Drake's exes and shawties" seeking legal recompense.
- United Way — Peyton Manning (as himself) appears in this 2007 spoof of self-serving philanthropic public-service ads by popular athletes. Documentary-style, Manning is shown "mentoring" children; what ensues is Manning physically and verbally abusing the kids during a football game (hitting kids in the back of the head with a football and sending one of them to sit in a Port-A-Let for messing up a play), and afterwards teaching his charges how to break into an SUV, exploiting a little girl to get a date with an attractive woman, showing kids a tabloid magazine featuring Angelina Jolie, drinking beer in front of them, and admitting that he would kill anyone who snitches on him.
- University of Westfield – An ad for an online college that teaches students how to avoid discussing going to an online college. As one student (portrayed by Nasim Pedrad) states, Westfield taught her "that going to an Internet college is not a thing that would make people want to hire me."
- Unstoppable – A trailer spoof of the 2010 motion picture starring Denzel Washington (Jay Pharoah) and Chris Pine (Taran Killam) is peppered with humorous put-downs by the train engineer leads and use of the Chrysler Building as a form of measurement by Rosario Dawson's (episode host Scarlett Johansson) yardmaster.
- Upfront Heating & Air Conditioning — This HVAC service advises customers that while the initial estimate process will go pleasantly, the actual installation/repair process from their unskilled & ill-mannered crew won't.
- UPS – In two parodies from December 2009, Bill Hader spoofs the courier's "What can Brown do for you?" ads that featured "a man in a lady wig" (creative director Andy Azula of The Martin Agency, UPS' ad agency) drawing whiteboard caricatures to demonstrate UPS' shipping capabilities.
- Urigro – In this January 2007 parody of male enhancement medications, Jason Sudeikis promotes "a drug approved for the treatment of Weak Male Urination Syndrome, or 'WeMUS'"; using it allows men to produce an absurdly long and strong stream of urine.
- Urkel – Just as it's about to dramatically reboot The Fresh Prince of Bel-Air, Peacock promotes "the next 90s show about the Black experience to be given a serious, high-stakes remake" – Family Matters, with lovelorn genius Steve Urkel (Chris Redd) shown as coming from a broken home (deceased father, alcoholic mother) and, after beating up another teen ("Did I do that?") and threatening them with a gun ("Should I do that?"), receiving reassurance from Chicago cop Carl Winslow (Kenan Thompson) that his own family can provide him a positive environment ("Family [expletive] matters").

== V ==
- Valtrex – An ad for an antiviral drug that treats genital herpes, an infection wife Amy Poehler was surprised to learn she had despite being in a (supposedly) faithful relationship with her husband (episode host Alec Baldwin), who insists he learned form "a recent scientific study" that some undetectable forms of herpes remain dormant in women for years. The closing tagline: "Ask your husband if you need Valtrex. He may know more than your doctor. Doctors don't know everything."
- Variety Characters on Characters – Actors on Actors, Variety's web series where stars have one-on-one discussions about their work, now has a holiday offshoot featuring famous seasonal characters. The pairings in this December 2025 promo include Rudolph (episode host Josh O'Connor) sitting with the Partridge in a Pear Tree (Bowen Yang), Grinch (Mikey Day) with Ebenezer Scrooge (James Austin Johnson), "former child stars" Drum Daddy (Kenan Thompson) and Tim (Marcello Hernández), and "literally the only two women in all of Christmas," Mrs. Claus (Chloe Fineman) and "the grandma from Grandma Got Run Over by a Reindeer" (Ashley Padilla).
- Veritas Ultrasound HD – Instead of a tiny monitor, the ultrasound is displayed on a widescreen HD television. It even has options to display a football helmet on the fetus (for dads-to-be missing a Sunday football because they're accompanying the wife to see the ultrasound).
- Verizon 4G LTE – Customer Fred Armisen is left confused by salesperson Bill Hader's bizarre explanations of how Verizon's high-speed data service will work on a very wide variety of smart devices.
- Virgania Horsen – Two ads from 2008 find Virgania (Kristen Wiig) offering her services to those who want to avoid long lines, rude employees, and even terrorists:
  - Virgania Horsen's Hot Air Balloon Rides – Skip the TSA line and let Virgania and her hot air balloon get you to your destination.
  - Virgania Horsen's Pony Express – You don't need the Post Office when horse-riding Virgania says, "Just give me your mail, and tell me where you want it to go!"
- Virtual Reality Books – Michael McKean talks up these alternatives to books, which have "been left behind" in the digital age. Though they may be improved, they're also impractical (the VR version of Moby-Dick has "Call me Ishmael" divided between two pages), something the ad itself isn't shy of pointing out ("The only limit is your imagination... and ours").
- Voting PSAs – Two public service announcements that have encouraged people to cast ballots in upcoming elections:
  - One "cut for time" PSA, posted online the weekend before the 2020 presidential election and in the same vein as the 2018 Democratic Party ad (see above), finds various Americans communicating trust in the electoral process, contentment in voting early... and preparing for the worst, as evidenced by the likes of Kyle Mooney buying a crossbow; Beck Bennett adding a safe door to his pantry; Heidi Gardner unsuccessfully sneaking across the border into Canada; and Kate McKinnon stealing all the contraceptives from a pharmacy. There is no specific sponsor attached (the official title is "Democracy PSA"), but the ad's closing message is clear: "Vote. Like, soon."
  - A PSA from Season 47's finale ("paid for by Stupid People") features a wide variety of Americans who admit they're not too bright (says Aidy Bryant, "The computer screen said 'prove you're not a robot.' And I cut myself.") but know that low IQs should not hinder anyone from voting ("Because stupid people vote too").

== W ==
- Wade Blasingame – You wouldn't want a human being humping your leg or digging up your lawn, so why would you let a dog do the same? Luckily, Blasingame (Will Ferrell) – "the attorney, not the ballplayer" – specializes in taking dogs to court over their rambunctious behavior. Also featuring Chris Parnell as Wade's brother/associate and the human simulating bad canine behavior in the ad's dramatizations.
- Waterbed Warehouse – Owner Dom (episode host Martin Freeman) lets wife Janine (Aidy Bryant) be the prominent face and musical voice of "Upper South Dakota's premier waterbed distributor."
- The Web – A "high-tech" security system that's really just a giant web that blocks burglars' front doors. The tagline: "The Web... he won't get into YOUR house, if he can't get out of HIS."
- Welcome Back, Potter – J.K. Rowling's book series goes full Welcome Back, Kotter when Harry Potter (Will Forte) returns to Hogwarts to teach "wizardry in the ghetto" to a new class. A 2002 promo for a new series on The WB's fall lineup (though for legal reasons it "may be called Honky in the 'Hood").
- Wells for Boys – For introspective little boys who simply long to be understood, this item from Fisher-Price's "Sensitive Boy" collection provides young lads a place for reflection, contemplation and the sharing of secrets; though Dad (Bobby Moynihan) may be puzzled and other boys may not get it, Mom (episode host Emma Stone) appreciates how her son can benefit from it ("This one thing is for him!").
- We're Just Friends – Short shorts for men (Jason Sudeikis and Andy Samberg) whose close friendship is often mistaken for a gay relationship.
- Westlink – Despite "finding a way to make the extraordinary commonplace" and promising "generations of insight and ingenuity", this April 2000 ad implies that Westlink's goal is so vague, even they don't know what it is.
- Whaaat? The Worst Cover Songs of All Time – Adam Duritz (Taran Killam), whose band Counting Crows covered "Big Yellow Taxi" with Vanessa Carlton in 2003 to mixed results, plugs an album of several bad cover songs, among them Britney Spears (Noël Wells) sassily performing "Hallelujah" a la "...Baby One More Time", "We Didn't Start the Fire" as sung by the sub-optimal pairing of Lil Wayne (Jay Pharoah) and Susan Boyle (Kate McKinnon), a so-called "cover" of the L.A. Law theme done by Adele (Aidy Bryant), which is just her standing there while it plays in the background, and episode host Lady Gaga simply performing her song "Born This Way" (which the ad states "may or may not be a cover of "Express Yourself"").
- Where You're Going – A Season 11 parody of beer and champagne ads (namely Michelob) marketed to the yuppie demographic. Here, Jon Lovitz, Randy Quaid, Damon Wayans, Anthony Michael Hall and others are shown enjoying the good life and their financial successes... until the ad becomes "a message from Almighty God" at the very end, when they're burning in Hell for living avaricious and spiritually bankrupt lives ("You're going to burn, no doubt about it").
- White Christmas – A trailer for "the first Black holiday movie for a white audience" (Essence calls it "the Macklemore of movies"), complete with a Madea-like character (episode host Paul Rudd).
- White Men Can Trump – "From Newsmax Studios and the writer of Like Mike" comes this film centered on Gordon Dwyer (episode host Shane Gillis), a loser in basketball and life, who is gifted a pair of Donald Trump-branded gold sneakers. The real-life shoes (which were released in February 2024, the same month of this parody) physically and psychologically bring out the "inner Trump" in Gordon: He still performs poorly on the court, at the office, and in bed, yet he can still constantly claim he's the best to the point that others start believing his bravado.
- Wilson Countersink Flanges and Dorry Flanges – Spokesman Phil Hartman talks up these technically complex industrial supplies, with Rob Schneider and Chris Farley appearing as workmen.
- Wilson Trap Doors – Unlike other office trap doors that malfunction or not work when you want them to, "patented dual-firing mechanism" allows this trap to work when businessman Jon Lovitz wants to do away with unwanted colleagues, clients, or other guests to his office. The closing tag line: "With Wilson, it's outta sight."
- Wing Pit – For your Super Bowl Sunday party, the restaurant can deliver party-size chicken wing and buffalo wing platters ranging from modestly sized trays (one- or two-dozen count) to orders literally in the hundreds or thousands (and accompanied by equally gargantuan-sized sauce arrangements).
- Winston-McCauley Funeral Home – A mortuary service that assures "care, compassion, dedication"... and that their employees will never have sex with dead bodies.
- Woomba – Tina Fey is one of the many women who own this self-operating electronic feminine hygiene product that knows when women should use it ("It's a little pink robot, and it cleans my business... my lady business"), whether they want to or not; a parody of the Roomba automatic vacuum system.
- The Worst of Soul Train – Smokey Robinson's less-famous relative Coughy Robinson (Bobby Moynihan) hosts this Time Life infomercial promoting a DVD collection of the least memorable acts to have performed on the long-running dance & music program Soul Train.
- Wrangler Open Fly Jeans – Finally, jeans with no-fly so that your parts are always camera-ready, as pitched by Brett Favre (played by Jason Sudeikis) ("Look, I put my pants on one leg at a time, like everybody else. Then... I pull muh penis out.").
- Wrangler Peekaboos – Jeans designed for men to show a little bit of butt cleavage. Will Ferrell appears in this ad cut for time from his November 2019 episode as host.
- Wrong Voice, Right Face – Stemming from the crooner-y voice Billy Idol used on his then-recent single "Eyes Without a Face", this 1984 album promo has Idol (Pamela Stephenson) sing Great American Songbook standards in that same crooner voice while keeping his anarchic punk look.

== X ==
- Xanax for Gay Summer Weddings – A new version of the anxiolytic designed for heterosexuals suffering anxiety over attending elaborate gay weddings.
- Xentrex – An ad for "the strongest male enhancement drug on the market," despite its dangerous ingredients, serious side effects, and the strong urging of doctors not to take it (as episode host Dwayne Johnson recounts in this ad).
- Xerox Assjet 790 – A sophisticated printer is all well and good for making copies of business reports, taxes, etc. But, Will Ferrell notes, "Can it copy your ass?" (Ana Gasteyer crashes through the bucket of a normal printer). So begins this September 1997 ad for a new printer made specifically for copying one's rear end, complete with a butt-shaped bucket.
- XIEMU – "Fast fashion from China" for less. How so cheap? "Don't worry about it," the voiceover insists, because it's not made by forced labor, only by "happy [and paid] workers" who do "quality craftsmanship" (even as the clothes fall apart on the models).

== Y ==
- Yard-a-Pult – This product allows you to launch unwanted trash, deceased pets, etc. over your fence rather than going to the time and expense of disposing of them properly.
- Your Hometown Board of Tourism – Why spend the holidays in someplace exotic like Hawai'i when this 2012 ad reminds you that your hometown is a more affordable destination. There's the "four-star accommodations of your childhood home," activities such as cleaning out your parents' garage, and exotic attractions such as your old high school.
- Your House – Looking to get away but can't go anywhere during the COVID-19 pandemic? This amped-up digital exclusive, filmed in Spring 2020, promotes your home as the perfect vacation destination. Visit exciting attractions such as your living room, enjoy convenient amenities including weak Wi-Fi, and dine on whatever expiried food is left in your refrigerator.
- You're a Rat Bastard, Charlie Brown – Seeking live holiday entertainment that's family-oriented yet also edgy? The New York Actors Studio offers this gritty take on Peanuts that's "Charlie Brown by way of Brooklyn." The cast features Al Pacino (Bill Hader) as the title character, Larry David (episode host Martin Short) as Linus, and Edie Falco (Kate McKinnon) as a prescription-packing Lucy.
- Yum Bubble Genital Herpes Gum – A fruit-flavored bubble gum that controls genital herpes. The joke here is less "a gum that doubles as a medicine" and more "Tim Meadows, Cheri Oteri, Tracy Morgan, and Jim Breuer saying 'genital herpes' over and over" (e.g. Oteri's statement of "So if you want to control your genital herpes, get Yum Bubble Genital Herpes gum for genital herpes!"). It comes in five flavors: banana, cherry, grape, orange, and "genital jungle fruit", the latter of which Breuer ("Surf's up, dude!") claims is his favorite.

== Z ==
- Zillow – Wanna spice up "playtime"? Browsing listings on the real estate website can be your next sexual fantasy... which ends once you click on "Contact Agent" and a nasally voiced RE/MAX rep (Cecily Strong) wants to schedule a tour. A sensually filmed ad from Season 46.
- Z-Shirt – Its name sums up what the product is: A 1990s hip-hop-style neon shirt with a "Z" on the front. As shirt-wearer Cal (Tim Robinson) exclaims, "This ain't no t-shirt, it's a Z-Shirt!" The comedy comes when his buddy Brian (episode host Kevin Hart) goes through the alphabet and asks, "Oh! Wait! I'm confused! Is that an A-Shirt?" "Is it a B-Shirt?" etc. Eventually, he goes on for so long that Cal speculates Brian is "dead behind [his] eyes". He finally gets to the end of the alphabet in a sketch later in the episode called "90's Funeral", interrupting a funeral attended by Cal.
