= French Silk =

Book by Sandra Brown

- Author: Sandra Brown
- Language: English
- Genre: Romance
- Published: 8 May 1992 (Warner Books)
- Media type: Print (Hardcover, Paperback)
- Pages: 416
- ISBN: 0-446-51654-6

French Silk is a romance novel written by Sandra Brown. It was published in 1992, and made the New York Times bestseller list. The novel is set in New Orleans and revolves around the murder of a televangelist; the suspects include the female founder of the "French Silk" mail order catalog whom the preacher had targeted as sinful.

It was also made into a 1994 TV movie starring Susan Lucci, Lee Horsley and R. Lee Ermey.

The book was the first of Brown's novels to be released in hardcover, and the first to be made into a movie. Its first print run was 150,000 copies.
