= List of awards and nominations received by Home Improvement =

Home Improvement received numerous awards and nominations in its eight-season run. Notable awards and nominations include:

== ASCAP Award ==
- 1992
  - WON - Top TV Series - (Dan Foliart)
- 1993
  - WON - Top TV Series - (Dan Foliart)
- 1994
  - WON - Top TV Series - (Dan Foliart)
- 1995
  - WON - Top TV Series - (Dan Foliart)
- 1996
  - WON - Top TV Series - (Dan Foliart)
- 1997
  - WON - Top TV Series - (Dan Foliart)
- 1998
  - WON - Top TV Series - (Dan Foliart)
- 2000
  - WON - Top TV Series - (Dan Foliart)

== Casting Society of America ==
- 1992
  - Nominated - Best Casting for TV, "Pilot" - (Deborah Barylski)

== Golden Globe Awards ==
- 1993
  - Nominated - Best Performance by an Actor in a Television Series - Musical or Comedy (Tim Allen)
- 1994
  - Nominated - Best Television Series - Musical or Comedy
  - Nominated - Best Performance by an Actress in a Television Series - Musical or Comedy (Patricia Richardson)
  - Nominated - Best Performance by an Actor in a Television Series - Musical or Comedy (Tim Allen)
- 1995
  - Nominated - Best Television Series - Musical or Comedy
  - Nominated - Best Performance by an Actress in a Television Series - Musical or Comedy (Patricia Richardson)
  - WON - Best Performance by an Actor in a Television Series - Musical or Comedy (Tim Allen)
- 1996
  - Nominated - Best Performance by an Actor in a Television Series - Musical or Comedy (Tim Allen)
- 1997
  - Nominated - Best Performance by an Actor in a Television Series - Musical or Comedy (Tim Allen)

== Humanitas Prize ==
- 1996
  - Nominated - 30 Minute Category (Elliot Shoenman and Marley Sims)

For the episode "The Longest Day".

== Nickelodeon Kids' Choice Awards ==
- 1994
  - WON - Favorite Television Actor (Tim Allen)
  - WON - Favorite Television Show
- 1995
  - WON - Favorite Television Actor (Tim Allen)
  - WON - Favorite Television Show
- 1996
  - WON - Favorite Television Actor (Tim Allen)
  - WON - Favorite Television Show
- 1997
  - WON - Favorite Television Actor (Tim Allen)
  - WON - Favorite Television Show
  - Nominated - Favorite Television Actor (Jonathan Taylor Thomas)
- 1998
  - WON - Favorite Television Actor (Jonathan Taylor Thomas)
  - Nominated - Favorite Television Actor (Tim Allen)
  - Nominated - Favorite Television Show
- 1999
  - Nominated - Favorite Television Actor (Tim Allen)
  - Nominated - Favorite Television Actor (Jonathan Taylor Thomas)

== People's Choice Awards ==
- 1992
  - WON - Favorite New TV Comedy Series
  - WON - Favorite Male Performer in a New TV Series (Tim Allen)
- 1993
  - WON - Favorite TV Comedy Series
  - WON - Favorite Male TV Performer (Tim Allen)
- 1994
  - WON - Favorite TV Comedy Series
  - WON - Favorite Male TV Performer (Tim Allen)
- 1995
  - WON - Favorite TV Comedy Series
  - WON - Favorite Male TV Performer (Tim Allen)
- 1996
  - WON - Favorite Male TV Performer (Tim Allen)
- 1997
  - WON - Favorite Male Television Performer (Tim Allen)
- 1998
  - WON - Favorite Male Television Performer (Tim Allen)
- 1999
  - WON - Favorite Male Television Performer (Tim Allen)

== Primetime Emmy Awards ==
- 1993
  - Nominated - Outstanding Comedy Series
  - Nominated - Outstanding Lead Actor in a Comedy Series (Tim Allen)
- 1994
  - Nominated - Outstanding Comedy Series
  - Nominated - Outstanding Lead Actress in a Comedy Series (Patricia Richardson)
- 1996
  - Nominated - Outstanding Lead Actress in a Comedy Series (Patricia Richardson)
- 1997
  - Nominated - Outstanding Lead Actress in a Comedy Series (Patricia Richardson)
- 1998
  - Nominated - Outstanding Lead Actress in a Comedy Series (Patricia Richardson)

== TV Guide Awards ==
- 1999
  - WON - Favorite Actor in a Comedy (Tim Allen)

== TV Land Awards ==
- 2009
  - WON - Fan Favorite Award (Tim Allen, Patricia Richardson, Zachary Ty Bryan, Jonathan Taylor Thomas, Taran Noah Smith, Richard Karn, Debbie Dunning, Earl Hindman, and the rest of the cast of Home Improvement.)

== YoungStar Awards ==
- 1997
  - Nominated - Best Performance by a Young Actor in a Comedy TV Series (Jonathan Taylor Thomas)
- 1998
  - Nominated - Best Performance by a Young Actor in a Comedy TV Series (Jonathan Taylor Thomas)
- 1999
  - WON - Best Performance by a Young Actor in a Comedy TV Series (Zachery Ty Bryan)
