= Play Dirty =

Play Dirty may refer to:

- Play Dirty (1969 film), a British war film
- Play Dirty (2025 film), an American crime thriller film
- Play Dirty (album), a 1983 album by Girlschool
- Play Dirty (novel), a 2007 novel by Sandra Brown
- "Play Dirty", a song by Poison, from the album Look What the Cat Dragged In
