= Sandra Brown =

American author

Sandra Lynn Cox Brown
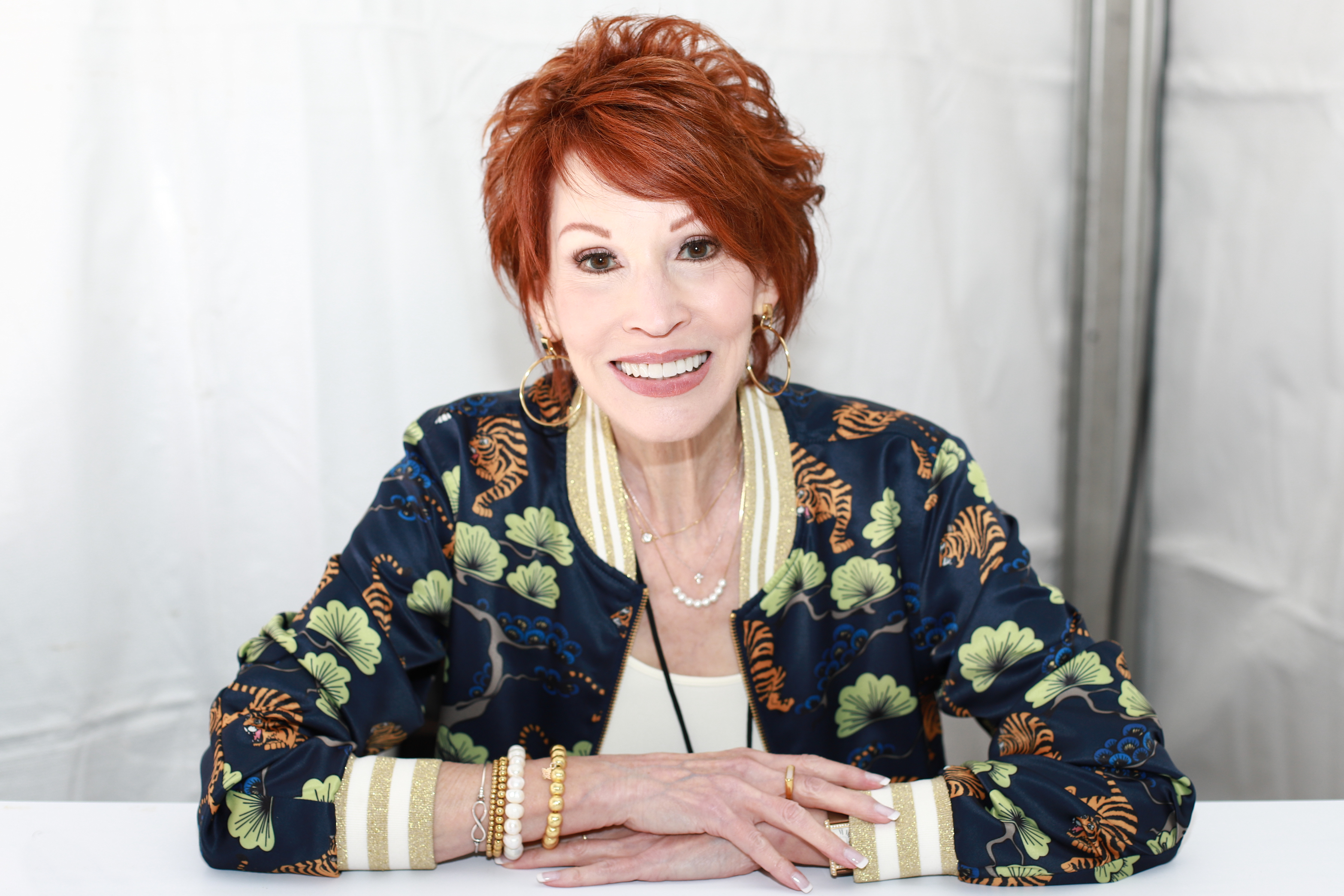
- Brown at the 2022 Texas Book Festival
- Born: March 12, 1948 (age 78); Waco, Texas, U.S.
- Education: Texas Christian University
- Occupation: Novelist
- Children: Ryan Brown, Rachel Brown
- Writing career
- Pen name: Rachel Ryan, Laura Jordan, Erin St. Claire
- Period: 1981–present
- Genres: Romance, suspense, thriller
- Website: http://www.SandraBrown.net/

Sandra Lynn Brown (née Cox; born March 12, 1948) is an American bestselling author of romantic novels and thriller suspense novels. She has also published works under the pen names Rachel Ryan, Laura Jordan, and Erin St. Claire.

== Early life and education ==
Sandra Brown was born in Waco, Texas, and raised in Fort Worth. She majored in English at Texas Christian University (TCU) in Fort Worth, but left college in 1968 to marry.

== Career ==
After her marriage, Brown worked for KLTV in Tyler as a weathercaster, then returned to the Dallas-Fort Worth metroplex area where she became a reporter for WFAA-TV's version of PM Magazine.

Brown started her writing career in 1981 after her husband dared her to. Since then, she has published nearly 70 novels and had more than 50 New York Times bestsellers. In 2008, she was presented with an honorary doctorate of humane letters from her alma mater, TCU.

Her novel French Silk was made into a movie, released in 1994, for television. Susan Lucci, Shari Belafonte, and Lee Horsley starred. In 2016, her novel White Hot was turned into a Hallmark Movies & Mysteries Original movie titled Sandra Brown's White Hot.

In 2007, she contributed to Court TV's series Murder By The Book, about the murder of Betty Gore in Wylie, Texas, on June 13, 1980.

On September 30, 2023, Brown announced on social media the finalizing of her divorce from her husband of fifty-five years, Michael Brown.

== Published works ==
=== As Rachel Ryan ===
Originally Dell Candlelight Ecstasy romances – single novels

- 1981 Love's Encore
- 1981 Love Beyond Reason
- 1982 Eloquent Silence
- 1982 A Treasure Worth Seeking
- 1983 Prime Time

=== As Laura Jordan ===
Single novels

- 1982 Hidden Fires (historical romance)
- 1982 The Silken Web

=== As Erin St. Claire ===
Originally published as Harlequin/Silhouette category romances – single novels

- 1982 Not Even for Love
- 1983 Seduction by Design
- 1983 A Kiss Remembered
- 1983 A Secret Splendor
- 1984 Words of Silk
- 1984 Bittersweet Rain
- 1984 Tiger Prince
- 1985 Sweet Anger
- 1986 Above and Beyond
- 1986 Honor Bound
- 1987 Two Alone
- 1989 The Thrill of Victory

Astray & Devil series

1. 1985 Led Astray
2. 1987 The Devil's Own

=== As Sandra Brown ===
Bantam Doubleday Dell's Loveswept category romance books

- 1983 Tomorrow's Promise
- 1983 Relentless Desire
- 1983 Heaven's Price
- 1983 Temptation's Kiss
- 1983 Tempest in Eden
- 1984 In a Class by Itself
- 1985 Thursday's Child
- 1985 Riley in the Morning
- 1986 The Rana Look
- 1986 22 Indigo Place
- 1987 Sunny Chandler's Return
- 1987 Demon Rumm
- 1988 Tidings of Great Joy
- 1988 Hawk O'Toole's Hostage
- 1989 Long Time Coming
- 1989 Temperatures Rising
- 1989 A Whole New Light

Bed & Breakfast series

1. 1983 Breakfast in Bed (originally Loveswept # 22)
2. 1984 Send No Flowers (originally Loveswept # 51)

Coleman Family Saga series (historical romance)

1. 1985 Sunset Embrace
2. 1985 Another Dawn

Mason Sisters series

1. 1987 Fanta C (originally Loveswept # 217)
2. 1988 Adam's Fall (originally Loveswept # 252)

Texas! Tyler Family Saga series

1. 1990 Texas! Lucky
2. 1991 Texas! Chase
3. 1991 Texas! Sage

Single title romance suspense/thrillers

- 1988 Slow Heat in Heaven
- 1989 Best Kept Secrets
- 1990 Mirror Image
- 1991 Breath of Scandal
- 1992 French Silk
- 1992 Shadows of Yesterday
- 1993 Where There's Smoke
- 1994 Charade
- 1994 Love beyond reason
- 1995 The Witness
- 1996 Exclusive
- 1997 Fat Tuesday
- 1998 Unspeakable
- 1999 The Alibi
- 2000 Standoff
- 2000 The Switch
- 2001 Envy
- 2002 The Crush
- 2003 Hello, Darkness
- 2004 White Hot
- 2005 Chill Factor
- 2006 Ricochet
- 2007 Play Dirty
- 2008 Smoke Screen
- 2009 Smash Cut
- 2009 Rainwater
- 2010 Tough Customer
- 2011 Lethal
- 2012 Love Is Murder
- 2012 Low Pressure
- 2013 Deadline
- 2014 Mean Streak
- 2015 Friction
- 2016 Sting
- 2017 MatchUp
- 2017 Seeing Red
- 2018 Tailspin
- 2019 Outfox
- 2020 Thick As Thieves
- 2021 Blind Tiger
- 2022 Overkill
- 2023 Out of Nowhere
- 2025 Blood Moon

Omnibus

- Three Complete Novels: Mirror Image / Best Kept Secret / Slow Heat In Heaven (1992)
- Three Complete Novels: Texas Lucky! / Texas Chase! / Texas Sage!
- Crush / Hello Darkness (2006)
- Heaven's Price / Breakfast in Bed / Send No Flowers (2007)
- Tomorrow's Promise / Two Alone (2008)
- Led Astray / Devil's Own (2010)
- A Secret Splendor / Above and Beyond (2011)

==== Non-fiction ====
- "The Risk of Seduction and the Seduction of Risk" essay in Dangerous Men and Adventurous Women: Romance Writers on the Appeal of the Romance (1992, ISBN 0-8122-3192-9, 0-8122-1411-0)

== Awards ==
- American Business Women's Association's Distinguished Circle of Success
- A.C. Greene Award
- Romance Writers of America's Lifetime Achievement Award
- International Thriller Writers Award, "Thrillermaster", 2008

== Notes ==
=== References ===
- Sandra Brown's official homepage
- Sandra Brown at eHarlequin
