= French Silk (film) =

1994 American television film

- Genre: Thriller
- Based on: French Silk by Sandra Brown
- Written by: Carol Monpere
- Directed by: Noel Nosseck
- Starring: Susan Lucci; Lee Horsley
- Music by: Patrick Williams
- Country of origin: United States
- Original language: English

Production
- Executive producers: Robert M. Sertner; Frank von Zerneck
- Producer: Gregory Prange
- Cinematography: Frank Byers
- Editor: Robert F. Shugrue
- Running time: 90 minutes
- Production companies: Lee Rich Productions; Von Zerneck Sertner Films

Original release
- Network: ABC
- Release: January 23, 1994

French Silk is a 1994 television film directed by Noel Nosseck and produced for ABC. Based on the 1992 romantic novel of the same name by Sandra Brown, the erotic thriller stars Susan Lucci as an owner of a lingerie store who becomes the prime suspect of a murder, and Lee Horsley as the detective who falls madly in love with her.

The film has been released on both VHS and DVD.

== Plot ==
The film opens with a report announcing the murder in New Orleans of Reverend Jackson Bird, a controversial evangelist preacher who used his powerful position on television to spread the word of God. Detective Cassidy (Horsley) is assigned to the case, and is led to his prime suspect: Claire Laurent (Lucci), the owner of a lingerie company called French Silk. Claire would have a strong motive for killing Reverend Bird, considering that he wanted to close down her company for thinking it was too obscene. Even though Claire denies ever having met the man, the media think of her as the murderer, leading to much negative publicity. Cassidy, who is known for being tough, falls for Claire after the first meeting. Following the announce of his death, Claire's model friend Martine (Belafonte) immediately flies over from New York to support her. Claire is unaware that Martine had multiple reasons for coming over to New Orleans, including to resume an affair with married Congressman Alister Petrie (Metzler).

Quickly, Cassidy finds out that Claire has made several lies to him about her background and about never having met Jackson, as well as finding information on the reverend in her dumpster. Worried, Claire calls her friend Andre (Warfield), who assures her that he has not told anything to the police. She continues to be battered by Cassidy on her background, and admits that she was born out of wedlock when her mother was only 16 years old. Cassidy then displays the audio tape of her phone call with Andre, but Claire connects the phone call yet again with her mother. She insists that she was taking a walk in the city around the time that Jackson was murdered, and reenacts the walk with Cassidy to prove it. Around this time, Cassidy proclaims his attraction towards her, and explains that he has made a serious mistake in his career past before, and cannot afford to be wrong again. They kiss afterwards.

Despite collecting more evidence on the murder proving Claire's guilt, by searching the French Silk's office, Cassidy falls more for her charm. When she notices that he is coming closer to arresting her, she attempts to send him away, though he persists to stay, leading for them to become intimate. As they are about to have sex, Claire grows convinced that he is only seducing her to lure her into a confession, and sends him away. Meanwhile, Martine tries to pressure Alister in leaving his wife for her, and when he announces that he wants to wait until after the election – which is in three months – she becomes enraged, and threatens to ruin his career. The next day, while Martine admits her affair with Alister to Claire, Cassidy is nearly fired by Chief Crowder (Ermey) for his assumption that he has been withholding information to the police due to his personal involvement with the suspect.

The same night, Martine, after also finding out that her career as a model is over, rushes to Alister's place with intentions of shooting him. When his teenage daughter Amy (Teague) opens the door, Martine becomes devastated and instead kills herself. Afterwards, it is revealed that the gun that she used to kill herself was the same that killed Jackson. Alister, however, tries to prove Martine's innocence by claiming that Martine was with him when Jackson was killed. He insists that, while it was in fact Martine's gun, it was taken on the night of Jackson's murder by someone who had direct access to her belongings. Cassidy rushes to the Laurent residence to confront Claire and her mother (Marshall) with the new proceedings, causing Claire to give an immediate confession of the murder. While Cassidy reluctantly takes her in, she is almost shot by a follower of Jackson, but Cassidy saves her life. Due to a riot, Cassidy has to change roads, and they stop at a family house of Claire. There, she admits that Jackson was not as holy as everyone thinks he was, and impregnated her mother when she was just a young convent girl. After explaining her motive, Claire kisses Cassidy, and they spend the night together intimately.

The next morning, as Claire is taken to jail, Andre comes forward to reveal that Claire is covering for her mother, whom she thinks killed Jackson. Claire eventually admits that she was trying to protect her mother, but it is revealed through Andre that Jackson has been blackmailing Alister for his several affairs. Claire mistakenly thought that her mother killed Jackson, and Alister was actually responsible for the murder, because he was fed up with being blackmailed. While Alister is arrested for murder, Claire is cleared from all charges and resumes her passionate relationship with Cassidy.

== Cast ==
- Susan Lucci as Claire Laurent
- Lee Horsley as Detective Roger Cassidy
- Shari Belafonte as Martine
- R. Lee Ermey as Chief Crowder
- Sarah Marshall as Mary Catherine Laurent
- Bobby Hosea as Devaux
- Jim Metzler as Congressman Alister Petrie
- Joe Warfield as Andre Phillippe
- Paul Rosenberg as Leon (Photographer)
- Taylor Simpson as Ariel Bird
- Monique Viator as Belle Petrie
- Victoria Edwards as Katie
- Tanya Teague as Amy Petrie
- Michael Bergeron as Jackson Bird
- Michael Arata as Jackson Bird, Jr.

== Reception ==
Variety magazine wrote: "The moody pic never quite draws one in, largely because the characters from scripter Carol Monpere are off-putting. Horsley lacks conviction, Lucci's idea of acting mysterious seems to be to act simple-minded. Director Noel Nosseck does a good job giving the pic a very definite look and feel: he just should have drawn more out of the two leads."
