= Something to Sing About (2000 film) =

2000 American Christian drama film

- Theatrical release poster
- Directed by: Charlie Jordan
- Written by: Jeff Durham; Granville Emerson; Peter Parros
- Produced by: John Shepherd
- Starring: Irma P. Hall; Darius McCrary; Tamera Mowry; Rashaan Nall; Lobo Sebastian
- Music by: James Covell
- Production company: Dean River Productions
- Distributed by: World Wide Pictures
- Release date: June 10, 2000 (United States)
- Running time: 87 minutes
- Country: United States
- Language: English

Something to Sing About is a 2000 American Christian drama film directed by Charlie Jordan, and starring Irma P. Hall, Darius McCrary, Kirk Franklin, Tamera Mowry, Rashaan Nall, and Helen Martin (in her final film appearance). It was produced by John Shepherd of World Wide Pictures. The storyline revolves around a young man, Tommy, an ex-convict who is trying to make a more fulfilling life for himself.

== Plot ==
The film opens as Tommy (portrayed by Darius McCrary), is reading a newspaper, trying to find a job. He eventually finds God and acceptance with help from people around who care.

== Cast ==
- Irma P. Hall as Memaw
- Darius McCrary as Tommy
- Tamera Mowry as Lily
- Rashaan Nall as "G-Smooth"
- Lobo Sebastian as "Creedo"
- Kirk Franklin as Charles
- Bart Braverman as Ahmeed
- John Amos as Reverend Washington
- Devika Parikh as Brenda Brass
- Brian J. White as Robert
- Jack Axelrod as Mr. Thompson
- Anna Berger as Mrs. Goldberg
- Sydney Lassick as Elderly Man
- Jules Dolcevita as Jules, Thug #1
- Grant Goodeve as Rass
- Helen Martin as Elderly Woman
- Keny Long as Henry
- Lance Nichols as Councilman
- Bob Nellis as Mark
- Stefiana Dela Cruz as Tracy
- Brian Sheridan as Cameraman
- Paul Tarrell Clayton as Police Officer #1
- Kristina Kreyling as Police Officer #2
- Holly Lewis as Stage Manager
- Rita Fiola as Cashier
- Jeffrey Garcia as Cop
- Charles Walker as Elder
- Marcille Block, Cory Briggs, Lashana Dendy, Stacy Houston, Brent Ray Jones, and Sheryl Panton-Dandridge as Choir Members
- Tamera Mowry, E. J. Hunter, Ariyan Johnson, and Charlie Jordan as Praise Dancers
