= Jessica Steen =

Canadian actress (born 1965)

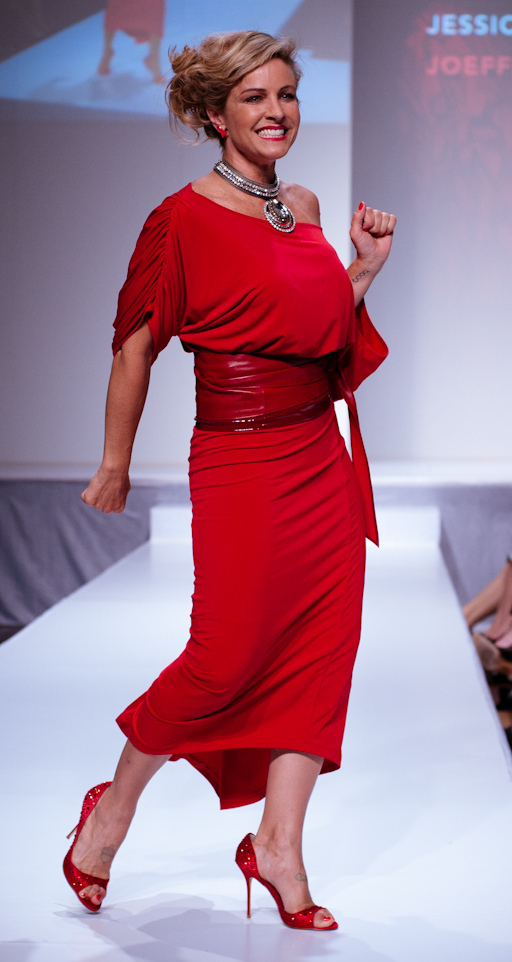
- Steen at The Heart Truth celebrity fashion show in 2012
- Born: December 19, 1965 (age 60); Toronto, Ontario, Canada
- Occupation: Actress
- Years active: 1981–present

Jessica Steen (born December 19, 1965) is a Canadian actress in both film and television, who may be best known for her recurring role as Lisa Stillman, on the CBC primetime drama series Heartland (2007–present).

== Personal life ==
Jessica Steen was born in Toronto, Ontario, the daughter of Joanna Noyes, an actress, and Jan Steen, a director and actor. She is of Dutch and Scottish ancestry.

== Career ==
In 1987, Steen was part of the main cast of the syndicated series Captain Power and the Soldiers of the Future, which ran for one season. For her performance in the episode "Judgment", she was nominated in 1988 for a Gemini Award for Best Performance by a Lead Actress in a Continuing Dramatic Role. That same year, she played Tracy Steelgrave on Wiseguy.

While based in Toronto, Steen appeared on various Canadian television series and in American made-for-TV films. In 1991, shortly after relocating to New York, she joined the cast of the soap opera Loving. She subsequently starred as a regular throughout the two-season run of the series Homefront.

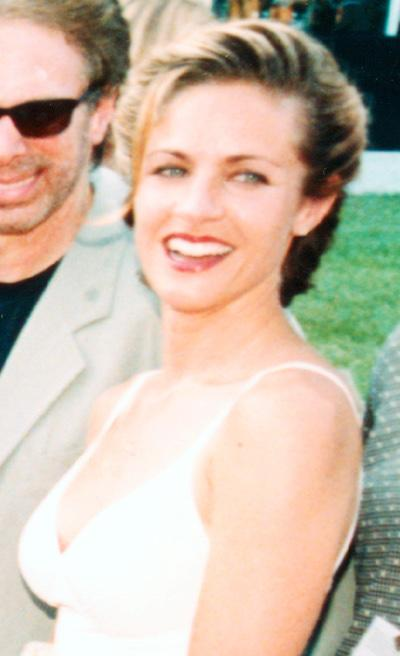
Steen at the Armageddon premiere, 1998

In 1994, she was cast as Dr. Julia Heller, a genetically enhanced physician, in the science fiction series Earth 2. Following the show's cancellation in 1995, Steen guest-starred on single episodes of several series, including The Outer Limits, ER, Murder One, Due South, and Touched by an Angel. In 1994, she also won the Gemini Award for Best Actress for her portrayal of Nora in the television film Small Gifts.

Steen portrayed District Attorney Elizabeth Gardner in the 1997 comedy film Trial & Error, earning praise from film critic Roger Ebert on Siskel & Ebert. Producer Jerry Bruckheimer subsequently recommended her for the role of the shuttle co-pilot in the 1998 blockbuster Armageddon, having remembered her performance as Cpl. Jennifer "Pilot" Chase in Captain Power and the Soldiers of the Future. During this period, she also took leading roles in Slap Shot 2: Breaking the Ice as well as the Disney television films Smart House and Principal Takes a Holiday.

In 2004, Steen was cast as Dr. Elizabeth Weir in "Lost City", the two-part finale of season 7 of Stargate SG-1. She was initially told that Weir would recur and transition into a central role in the spin-off Stargate Atlantis, and was advised to keep her schedule clear of conflicting weekly commitments.

However, Steen's tenure on the franchise was short-lived. She later noted that she may have overwhelmed the production team with hyper-specific technical inquiries, driven by extensive background research, while deliberately avoiding prior episodes or the original film to play Weir as a genuine "fish out of water." At the same time, Steen was deeply committed to the annual Burning Man festival — an event she had been personally and professionally connected to since 1998, organizing community camps and experiences, and which she considered akin to family. Because of the stigma surrounding the event at the time, her agent advised her to cite a mandatory family reunion to attend. Months later, she was released from her contract; her agent informed her that the producers felt her commitment to the festival outweighed her dedication to the series. Steen was subsequently replaced by Torri Higginson, dispelling long-standing fan speculation that her departure was due to an unwillingness to relocate to Vancouver.

Outside of the science fiction genre, Steen played Myra Teal in the 2002 Monk episode "Mr. Monk and the Billionaire Mugger", and had a recurring role as Special Agent Paula Cassidy on the CBS procedural NCIS from 2004 to 2007. In the fall of 2007, she appeared on the Canadian series jPod, and later that year debuted as Lisa Stillman in the third episode of Heartland, continuing in the recurring role into the show's nineteenth season.

From 2009 to 2012, Steen recurred as Strategic Response Unit Constable Donna Sabine on the police drama Flashpoint. Her work on the episodes "Clean Hands" and "The Perfect Family" earned her a 2010 Gemini Award nomination for Best Performance by an Actress in a Featured Supporting Role in a Dramatic Series, followed by a 2013 Canadian Screen Award nomination for Best Performance in a Guest Role, Dramatic Series for the episode "A New Life".

Between 2018 and 2020, Steen appeared in several television films for Hallmark and Lifetime, including A Midnight Kiss, Matching Hearts, Chateau Christmas, The Babysitter (also known as The Baby Monitor Murders), and Stolen by My Mother: The Kamiyah Mobley Story.

== Filmography ==
=== Film ===
| Year | Title | Role | Notes |
|---|---|---|---|
| 1981 | Threshold | Tracy Vrain | |
| 1983 | Gentle Sinners | Donna | |
| 1986 | A Judgment in Stone | Melinda Coverdale | |
| 1986 | Flying | Carly Simmons | |
| 1987 | John and the Missus | Faith | |
| 1989 | Sing | Hannah Gottschalk | |
| 1990 | Still Life: The Fine Art of Murder | Nellie Ambrose | |
| 1996 | Dog Watch | Janet | Video |
| 1997 | Trial and Error | Elizabeth Gardner | |
| 1998 | Armageddon | Co-Pilot Jennifer Watts | |
| 1999 | Question of Privilege | Andrea Roberts | |
| 2000 | The Ride Home | Clara | Short film |
| 2001 | Apocalypse IV: Judgment | Victoria Thorne | |
| 2002 | Slap Shot 2: Breaking the Ice | Jessie Dage | Video |
| 2003 | Flip Phone | Sue | Short film |
| 2005 | Chaos | Karen Cross | |
| 2005 | Left Behind: World at War | Carolyn Miller | |
| 2008 | Transit Lounge | Roberta | Short film |
| 2013 | The Sound of Willie Nelson's Guitar | Karen | Short film |

=== Television ===
| Year | Title | Role | Notes |
|---|---|---|---|
| 1983 | Hangin' In | Darcy | Episode: "I've Got a Secret" |
| 1983 | SCTV Channel | College Student | Episode: "It's a Wonderful Film" |
| 1984 | When We First Met | Gail Pennoyer | TV movie |
| 1984 | The Edison Twins | Elaine | Episode: "Enemy of Weston" |
| 1985 | Workin' for Peanuts | Mellisa Stotts | TV movie |
| 1985 | Home Free | Daughter | TV movie |
| 1985 | The Littlest Hobo | Leslie 'Torque' Davidson | Episode: "Torgue" |
| 1985 | Striker's Mountain | Lowni Striker | TV movie |
| 1985 | Night Heat | Michelle Parker | Episode: "The Source" |
| 1986 | Night Heat | Angela Rivera | Episode: "Fighting Back" |
| 1986 | Kay O'Brien | Lindsay | Episode: "Little White Lies" |
| 1986 | The Truth About Alex | Kay | TV movie |
| 1986 | The Edison Twins | Elaine | Episode: "What Goes Up" |
| 1986 | The Campbells | Amanda Sims | Episode: "Blinded by Love" |
| 1986 | Walt Disney's Wonderful World of Color | Tracy Gordon | Episode: "Young Again" |
| 1986 | Easy Prey | Wendy Robinson | TV movie |
| 1987 | CBS Schoolbreak Special | Kate | Episode: "The Day They Came to Arrest the Book" |
| 1987 | Alfred Hitchcock Presents | Sally Carlyle | Episode: "Man on the Edge" |
| 1987 | Wiseguy | Tracy Steelgrave | Episode: "Pilot" |
| 1987–1988 | Captain Power and the Soldiers of the Future | Corporal Jennifer 'Pilot' Chase | 22 episodes |
| 1989 | C.B.C.'s Magic Hour | Jennifer McPhail | Episode: "High Country" |
| 1989 | The Rocket Boy | The Rocket Boy's Girlfriend | TV movie |
| 1990 | Christmas in America | Eileen Morgan | TV movie |
| 1990 | Knights of the Kitchen Table | Marla McDermott | TV movie |
| 1990 | Street Legal | Karen MacNeil | Episode: "Softsell" |
| 1991 | The Great Pretender | Kate Hightower | TV movie |
| 1991 | Tropical Heat | Patricia Poston Phd. | Episode: "Dead Men Tell" |
| 1991 | Loving | Patricia 'Trisha' Alden Sowolsky Hartman McKenzie | 5 episodes |
| 1991–1993 | Homefront | Linda Metcalf | 42 episodes |
| 1993 | Herman's Head | Heather | Episode: "When Hairy Met Hermy" |
| 1994 | Small Gifts | Nora | TV movie |
| 1994 | To Save the Children | Kathi Davidson | TV movie |
| 1994–1995 | Earth 2 | Dr. Julia Heller | 21 episodes |
| 1996 | ER | Karen Hardy | Episode: "True Lies" |
| 1996 | The Outer Limits | Gina Beaumont | Episode: "The Refuge" |
| 1997 | Murder One | Paige Weikopf | 4 episodes |
| 1997 | Touched by an Angel | Sarah Bingham | Episode: "Full Moon" |
| 1998 | Principal Takes a Holiday | Celia Shine | TV movie |
| 1999 | The Pretender | Rachel | Episode: "The Assassin" |
| 1999 | Due South | Constable Maggie MacKenzie | Episode: "Hunting Season" |
| 1999 | Smart House | Sara Barnes | TV movie |
| 1999 | The Practice | Brianna Hatfield | Episode: "Marooned" |
| 1999 | The Outer Limits | Stephanie Sawyer | Episode: "Essence of Life" |
| 2000 | On Hostile Ground | Allison Beauchamp | TV movie |
| 2000 | The Outer Limits | Kathrine | Episode: "The Grid" |
| 2001 | The Practice | Dr. Sarah Ford | Episode: "Inter Arma Silent Leges" |
| 2002 | Society's Child | Terry Best | TV movie |
| 2002 | Untitled Secret Service Project | Maureen Gage | TV movie |
| 2002 | Monk | Myra Teal | Episode: "Mr. Monk and the Billionaire Mugger" |
| 2002 | The Pact | Det. Anne-Marie Marrone | TV movie |
| 2003 | The Paradise Virus | Susan Holme | TV movie |
| 2003 | L.A. Dragnet | Amy Wenzel | Episode: "The Cutting of the Swath" |
| 2003 | Mutant X | Dr. Sara Stanton | Episode: "The Taking of Crows" |
| 2003–2007, 2015 | NCIS | NCIS Special Agent Paula Cassidy | 6 episodes |
| 2004 | Stargate SG-1 | Dr. Elizabeth Weir | Episode: "Lost City: Part 1"; Episode: "Lost City: Part 2" |
| 2004 | Nip/Tuck | Amy Connors | Episode: "Kimber Henry" |
| 2005 | Charmed | Ruth Brody | Episode: "Ordinary Witches" |
| 2005 | Kojak | Kate | Episode: "Pilot" |
| 2005 | Eyes | Holly Gibson | Episode: "Shots" |
| 2005 | Killer Instinct | Dr. Francine Klepp | 7 episodes |
| 2006 | Supernatural | Deputy Kathleen Hudak | Episode: "The Benders" |
| 2006 | CSI: Crime Scene Investigation | Donna Basset | Episode: "Toe Tags" |
| 2006 | Rapid Fire | Linda | TV movie |
| 2007–present | Heartland | Lisa Stillman | 128 episodes |
| 2008 | Canooks | Katherine 'Kat' Baines | Web Series/Those Damn Canadians |
| 2008 | jPod | Freedom | 3 episodes |
| 2008 | Vipers | Dr. Collins | TV movie |
| 2009 | My Nanny's Secret | Julia | TV movie |
| 2009–2012 | Flashpoint | Donna Sabine | 11 episodes |
| 2012 | Republic of Doyle | Sonja Sterling | 3 episodes |
| 2012 | Bullet in the Face | Eva Braden | 6 episodes |
| 2018 | Grey's Anatomy | Dr. Rebecca Froy | Episode: "Beautiful Dreamer" |
| 2018 | A Midnight Kiss | Barbara Pearson | Hallmark Movie |
| 2019 | Charmed | Elder Devorah Silver | 2 Episodes |
| 2020 | Stolen by My Mother: The Kamiyah Mobley Story | Judge Marianne Aho | Lifetime TV Movie |
| 2020 | The Babysitter aka The Baby Monitor Murders | Jennifer | Lifetime TV Movie |
| 2020 | Matching Hearts | Barbara | Hallmark TV Movie |
| 2020 | Sacred Lies | Arwen Reed | Episode: "Chapter Nine: Bloodlines" |
| 2020 | Chateau Christmas | Renee | Hallmark TV Movie |
| 2021 | Maid | Doreen | 2 episodes |
| 2024 | Mayor of Kingstown | Sarah | Recurring cast |
