= Spoken Word (film) =

- Theatrical release poster
- Directed by: Victor Nuñez
- Written by: William T. Conway; Joe Ray Sandoval
- Produced by: Karen Koch; William T. Conway
- Starring: Kuno Becker; Ruben Blades; Miguel Sandoval; Persia White
- Cinematography: Virgil Mirano
- Edited by: Victor Nunez; Justin Geoffroy
- Music by: Michael Brook
- Production companies: New Mexico Media Partners; Luminaria Productions
- Distributed by: Variance Films
- Release dates: March 1, 2009 (Aguascalientes Festival); July 23, 2010 (United States)
- Running time: 116 minutes
- Country: United States
- Language: English

Spoken Word is a 2009 drama film directed by Victor Nuñez and starring Kuno Becker, Ruben Blades, Miguel Sandoval and Persia White.

The writers include William T. Conway and Joe Ray Sandoval. The film was produced by Karen Koch and William T. Conway. It opened in New York City at Big Cinemas Manhattan 1 on July 23, 2010, and played in Los Angeles at Laemmle's Sunset 5 on July 30, 2010.

== Plot ==
Cruz Montoya, a Latino spoken word artist from San Francisco returns home to Santa Fe, New Mexico to reconnect with his brother and dying father. Cruz soon finds himself spiraling back into his former life of drugs and violence that he left behind.

== Cast ==
- Kuno Becker as Cruz Montoya
- Ruben Blades as Senior
- Miguel Sandoval as Emilio
- Persia White as Shae
- Rashaan Nall as Cloudy
- Chris Ranney as Bartender

== Reception ==
On review aggregator website Rotten Tomatoes the film has a score of 42% based on reviews from 12 critics, with an average rating of 5.4/10. On Metacritic, Spoken Word have a rank of 56 out of a 100 based on 13 critics, indicating "mixed or average reviews".

Nick Schager of Slant Magazine gave the film one star out of 4, while Roger Ebert of the Chicago Sun-Times gave it 3 out of 4 and called Spoken Word "A rich and textured film".
