= Taran Noah Smith =

American businessman

- Education: University of Southern California
- Occupation: Actor
- Years active: 1991–1999
- Known for: Mark Taylor in Home Improvement
- Spouse: Heidi van Pelt (m. 2001; div. 2007)
- Awards: Young Artist Award Exceptional Performance by a Young Actor Under Ten; 1992 Home Improvement; Young Artist Award Outstanding Youth Ensemble in a Television Series; 1994 Home Improvement

Taran Noah Smith is an American businessman and former actor. He played Mark Taylor on the sitcom Home Improvement, for which he won two Young Artist Awards in 1992 and 1994.

== Personal life ==
At 18, he gained control of his $1.5 million trust fund, which he accused his parents of squandering by purchasing a mansion for themselves. His mother, Candy Bennici, stated in 2015, "Of course we didn't touch his money... It was in a trust fund. We couldn't have touched it if we wanted to. They were trying to get it when he was 17, and we were trying to protect it. Luckily the Marin courts were very good about it and didn't give it to them". He later said, "I'd gotten out of the teenage phase and realized my parents weren't doing anything wrong but were trying to protect me."

In 2001, Smith was quoted as saying, "I started Home Improvement when I was seven, and the show ended when I was 16. I never had the chance to decide what I wanted to do with my life. When I was 16, I knew that I didn't want to act anymore." At the age of 17, Smith married Heidi van Pelt on April 27, 2001. The marriage sparked much controversy due to the couple's age difference, as van Pelt was 16 years older. The couple filed for divorce on February 2, 2007.

Smith is a vegan. In 2005, Smith and his then-wife formed a California-based non-dairy cheese manufacturer and restaurant, Playfood, specializing in vegan and organic foods. In 2014, he volunteered doing disaster relief with Communitere in the Philippines.

Smith is also the Technical Manager for the Community Submersibles Project, where he teaches people how to pilot submarines.

== Filmography ==
Actor
Year	Title	Role	Notes
1991–1999	Home Improvement	Mark Taylor	201 episodes Credited as Taran Smith in season 8
1995	Ebbie	Tiny Tim	Television film
1997	Little Bigfoot 2: The Journey Home	Brian Ferris	
1997	7th Heaven	Peter McKinley	Episode: "See You in September"
1999	Batman Beyond	Patrick	Voice, episode: "Rats"

Self
Year	Title	Notes
1992	The 18th Annual People's Choice Awards	
1992	Nickelodeon Kids' Choice Awards '92	
1993	The 19th Annual People's Choice Awards	
1994	The 20th Annual People's Choice Awards	
1995	The 21st Annual People's Choice Awards	
1995	Nickelodeon Kids' Choice Awards '95	
1997–1998	Figure It Out	TV series
1999	Home Improvement: Backstage Pass	
2002	TVography: Home Improvement – A Half Hour of Power	
2005	20/20	Episode: "29 April 2005"
2005	E! True Hollywood Story	Episode: "Home Improvement"
2006	Child Star Confidential	Episode: "The Kid's Table"
2009	The 7th Annual TV Land Awards	

== Awards ==
=== Nominations ===
- 1993, Young Artist Award, Home Improvement, Outstanding Actor Under Ten in a Television Series
- 1999, Young Artist Award, Home Improvement, Best Performance in a TV Drama or Comedy Series – Leading Young Actor

=== Won ===
- 1992, Young Artist Award, Home Improvement, Exceptional Performance by a Young Actor Under Ten
- 1994, Young Artist Award, Home Improvement, Outstanding Youth Ensemble in a Television Series (shared with Zachery Ty Bryan and Jonathan Taylor Thomas)
