= Snipes (film) =

- Directed by: Rich Murray
- Written by: Rich Murray; Rob Wiser
- Produced by: Rich Murray; Chris Schwartz
- Starring: Nelly; Dean Winters
- Cinematography: Alex Buono
- Edited by: Seth Anderson
- Release date: September 12, 2001
- Running time: 113 minutes 107 minutes
- Country: United States
- Language: English

Snipes is a 2001 American drama film directed by Rich Murray and featuring Sam Jones III, Nelly, Zoe Saldaña and Dean Winters. It is Murray's feature directorial debut, and both Jones' and Nelly's feature film debut.

== Plot ==
Snipes starts off with a young man from Philadelphia, Pennsylvania named Erik looking up to a local rapper named Prolifik. Erik works for the Hype Studio as part of its street promo team, putting up posters around the city of Hype's newest artist, Prolifik.

He frequently speaks with Cheryl who also works at Hype Studio. Bobby Starr owns this studio/record label and also works for a mob boss named Johnnie Marandin who already despises him for sleeping with his daughter when he was only supposed to mentor her. There is a problem with Prolifik though: He has already spent his advance money and Bobby expects him to deliver a full project. Bobby threatens to end Prolifik's career if he cannot deliver a project soon.

Clarence came up with a scheme. He decided to get his friends to “kidnap him” and record his "murder". In the recording, his friends hold up master tapes of Prolifik's " album", which Prolifik's friends hold for ransom.

Erik and his rapper friend Malik want to get into the music industry and record music. Erik steals the studio key from Cheryl’s desk and he and Malik sneak into the studio to record one night. While there, they witness a murder and escape. The next day it seems as though the double murder didn’t happen. Erik starts to question it, even telling Cheryl about it. Meanwhile Malik is visited at his home by Bobby Starr and two other gangsters. Bobby reveals that important tapes were stolen from the studio that night and he assumes Malik and Erik stole them. When Malik is about to deny being at the studio, Erik calls leaving a voicemail heard by them all, revealing that he and Malik were at the studio. Using this as a distraction, Malik is able to escape outside being closely chased by Bobby and the gangsters. As he makes his get away he is struck by a car and dies on the scene. Erik comes to the scene a short time later and breaks down over Malik's death

Erik and Cheryl have decided to flee and hold up at a motel. Soon enough, Bobby finds Erik and has his henchman kidnap him and bring him to Hype Studio. He continuously beats Erik, even slicing his nose, asking about the tapes. When Erik is threatened with death if he doesn't reveal who has the music tapes, he gives Bobby the name "Nino Brown" (Malik's stage name). Bobby and his crew leaves Erik for a short time to determine if this is true. Erik uses this time to escape with a tape of Prolifik's "death". Back on the street, Erik tries to get to a pay phone, encounters Bugsy and Trix, two people Erik previously spoken to whose own posters were taken down by him to promote Prolifik, and eventually collapses from blood loss.

Erik wakes up at their clubhouse, and has his nose sewed up by Trix. After Erik and Bugsy watch Prolifik's "death" tape, Erik decides to investigate Prolifik's death and his missing music.

After meeting up with Cheryl, she reveals to Erik that the signing of Prolifik was a scheme: The real Prolifik was a rapper named Damon. One night, Clarence and his entourage (including Damon) were involved in a robbery gone awry and Damon was killed. The day before the incident, Cheryl had brought a tape to Bobby and Bobby wanted to sign Prolifik. Since Clarence knew every word to every song and the mannerisms and Bobby had never seen him, Clarence decided to portray the role of Prolifik. However, Clarence did not have talent, which is the reason he couldn’t produce a second album and therefore orchestrated his own "kidnapping" and "murder"

Bobby is approached by Johnnie and his henchmen. Johnnie tells Bobby he has let him down especially for his relations with his daughter. Bobby is trying to persuade Johnnie that he will get the second album out bringing in more money, Johnnie doesn’t want to hear it. Johnnie tells Bobby they are going to go “for a ride” presumably to kill Bobby.

The plan goes awry once Cheryl and Erik get involved. While Erik is away, Clarence kills Floyd, kidnaps Cheryl and brings her to an abandoned house. The two wrestle over Clarence's gun, which lead to the two falling down the stairs. The two then try to each get to the gun, though Clarence gets the gun and fatally shoots her. Erik arrives and is able to talk to Cheryl before she dies. An injured Clarence recognizes Erik from their previous encounter and tries to convince him to help him out of the basement. However, as Erik pulls his own gun on Clarence. Clarence attempts to shoot Erik, but his gun is empty. As he attempts to reload, Erik demands he stops, at which just as Clarence is about to shoot him Erik kills Clarence.

In the aftermath, Erik, with the master tapes of Clarence's "album" in his possession, encounters and talks to Bugsy, who informs Erik of Bobby Star's demise. After talking to Bugsy, Erik dumps the tapes in a body of water under a bridge. He then begins to walk away, with the sound of radio DJ Sway Calloway announcing Prolifik's death and playing his music in the background.

== Cast ==
- Sam Jones III as Erik (Snipes) Triggs
- Zoe Saldaña as Cheryl
- Nelly as Prolifik/Clarence
- Dean Winters as Bobby Starr
- Rashaan Nall as Floyd
- Schoolly D as Tony
- Joel Garland as Ceaser
- Mpho Koaho as Malik
- Victor Togunde as Midas
- Carlo Alban as Bugsy
- Rich Heidelberg as Donnie
- Frank Vincent as Johnnie Marandino
- Charli Baltimore as Trix
- Johnnie Hobbs Jr. as Mr. Triggs

== Reception ==
The film has a 25% rating on Rotten Tomatoes. Michael Sragow of The Baltimore Sun awarded the film one and a half stars.
