= Between Love and Hate (1993 film) =

1993 American television film

- Genre: Crime; Drama
- Written by: D. Victor Hawkins; Tom Nelson; Rebecca Whittington
- Directed by: Rod Hardy
- Starring: Susan Lucci; Barry Bostwick; Patrick Van Horn
- Music by: Charles Bernstein
- Country of origin: United States
- Original language: English

Production
- Executive producer: John Cosgrove
- Producer: Jay Benson
- Cinematography: David Connell
- Editor: Richard Bracken
- Running time: 89 minutes
- Production companies: Cosgrove/Meurer Productions; World International Network

Original release
- Network: ABC
- Release: February 22, 1993

Between Love and Hate is a 1993 American television movie directed by Rod Hardy.

== Background ==
Between Love and Hate was the ninth TV movie Lucci appeared in. Her role, a seductive married mother, was compared by several reviewers to Erica Kane, her famous role on the soap opera All My Children. Lucci said she took the role because of the "page-turner" script.

== Plot ==
Matt, a 19-year-old swimming coach at a country club, who is a virgin, has an affair with Vivian, a married mother in her forties whose daughter is taking classes with him.

When her husband Justin finds out about the affair after finding the couple's love letters, Vivian is forced to end it, upsetting Matt. This results in a chain of reactions from photocopying of love letters leading up to Matt shooting her dead.

== Cast ==
- Susan Lucci.....Vivian Conrad
- Barry Bostwick.....Justin Conrad
- Patrick Van Horn.....Matt Templeton

== Critical reception ==
The Chicago Tribune was somewhat positive on the film, writing that Lucci was "pretty good in her part." The Calgary Herald panned the film: as "an amateurish knockoff of The Graduate."
