= Lawrence Adisa =

American actor, producer, and writer

Lawrence B. Adisa
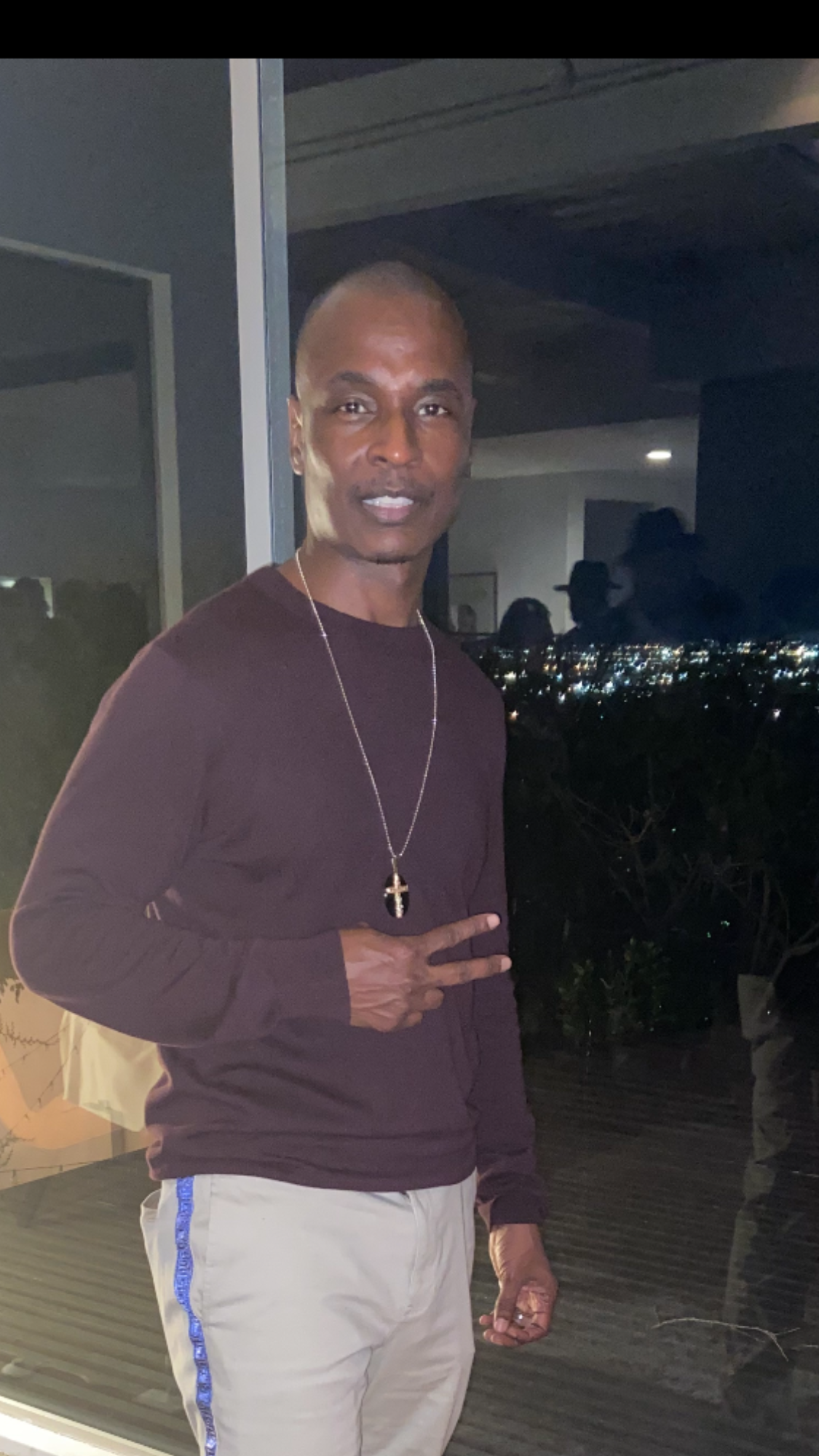
- Born: October 3, 1968 (age 57); Mount Vernon, New York, U.S.
- Occupations: Actor, television producer, writer
- Years active: 1993–present
- Spouse: Camille Adisa
- Children: Mazin Adisa
- Parent: Jean Kirkland

Lawrence B. Adisa (born October 3, 1968) is an American actor, producer, and writer. Adisa is majorly known for Clockers (1995), New York Undercover, and 7th Heaven.

== Biography ==
Adisa has appeared in films and many hit TV shows guest starring with Alan Alda (ER), Dick Van Dyke (Diagnosis Murder), Bill Cosby (Cosby Mysteries), Toni Braxton (Play'd A Hip Hop Story), and Regina King (NY Undercover) just to name a few. After landing a supporting role on the film Clockers directed by Spike Lee, Adisa went on to enjoy a steady career with numerous guest star TV roles. Off camera, he has written and produced feature films. The Warner Brothers released comedy, Grindin (2007) and The Love Section (2013) which appeared on BET and he produced BnB Hell (2017) which he appeared on.

=== Early life ===
Adisa was born on October 3, 1968, in Mount Vernon, New York. Studying with the Black Filmmakers Foundation and HB Studios, he built his skills and confidence. His acting career began in 1992, taking roles in off-Broadway productions.

=== Career ===
Since 1994 Adisa has worked with a who's who in Hollywood both in front of and behind the camera. In 2016 Adisa launched his new production company, Lawrence Adisa Films, LLC. All present and future projects fall under the Lawrence Adisa Films, LLC umbrella.

== Filmography ==
=== Actor ===
- 2013 The Love Section as Ali Reese
- 2012 The Mentalist(TV Series) as Morgue Attendant
- 2011 Convincing Clooney as Lawrence
- 2009 Raising the Bar (TV Series) as Rahim
- 2008 Need for Speed: Undercover (Video Game) as Brad 'Nickel' Rogers
- 2007 Starting from Scratch as Dylan
- 2005 187 Ride or Die (Video Game) Crew
- 2003 A Single Rose (Short) as Younger Owens
- 2002 Play'd: A Hip Hop Story (TV Movie) asBangs
- 1996–2001 NYPD Blue (TV Series) as Robert 'R.J.' Jenkins / Charlton Moody
- 2000 The Hoop Life (TV Series)
- 2000 7th Heaven (TV Series) as Juror
- 1999 Diagnosis Murder (TV Series) as Billy
- 1999 ER (TV Series) as Josh's Cousin
- 1998 Nash Bridges (TV Series) as Obediah Crow
- 1997 Mad About You (TV Series) as Theresa's Boyfriend
- 1997 L.A. Heat (TV Series) as Lemar
- 1997 On the Line (TV Movie) as Carl
- 1997 Pacific Blue (TV Series) as Ardel Means
- 1997 NewsRadio (TV Series) as Three Card Monte Dealer
- 1994–1996 New York Undercover (TV Series) as Leroy Green / Ray
- 1995 Clockers as Stan
- 1994 The Cosby Mysteries (TV Series) as Three-Card-Monte Dealer

=== Producer ===
- 2017 BnB HELL (producer)
- 2013 The Love Section (producer)
- 2007 Grindin' (executive producer) / (producer)

=== Writer ===
- 2013 The Love Section
- 2007 Grindin'
