= Principal Takes a Holiday =

1998 television film directed by Robert King

- VHS cover
- Genre: Comedy
- Teleplay by: Robert King
- Story by: Paul Wolff; Robert King
- Directed by: Robert King
- Starring: Kevin Nealon; Zachery Ty Bryan; Jessica Steen; Rashaan H. Nall; Kurt Fuller; Bill Nye; Carlos Jacott
- Music by: Mark Mothersbaugh
- Country of origin: United States
- Original language: English

Production
- Executive producers: Craig Zadan; Neil Meron
- Producer: Fitch Cady
- Cinematography: Philip Linzey
- Editor: Bonnie Koehler
- Running time: 96 minutes
- Production companies: Storyline Entertainment; Walt Disney Television

Original release
- Network: ABC
- Release: January 4, 1998

Principal Takes a Holiday is a 1998 American comedy television film written and directed by Robert King, based on a story by King and Paul Wolff. It stars Kevin Nealon, Zachery Ty Bryan and Jessica Steen, and aired on ABC on January 4, 1998, as an episode of The Wonderful World of Disney anthology series.

== Plot ==
John Scaduto, a troublesome high school senior, makes a deal with his parents that he will not get into any more trouble until he graduates to receive a $10,000 gift from his grandma. However, when his principal Frank Hockenberry is involved in an accident in a prank that he planned, he finds a homeless man named Franklin Fitz to act as the acting principal to keep his parents and every one else none the wiser. While acting as principal, Franklin falls for Celia Shine, a fellow teacher.

Meanwhile, new student Peter Heath gets involved with John's plan in order for John to help him get a date with his crush Roxanne.

== Cast ==
- Kevin Nealon as Franklin Fitz
- Zachery Ty Bryan as John Scaduto
- Jessica Steen as Celia Shine
- Rashaan H. Nall as Peter Heath
- Kurt Fuller as Frank Hockenberry
- Ellie Harvie as Miss W. Fassle
- Laurie Murdoch as Vice Principal Ralph Calder
- Emmanuelle Chriqui as Roxanne
- Bill Nye as Science Teacher
- Carlos Jacott as Oliver
- Walter Marsh as Dr. Vernon Baxter

== Home media ==
The film was released on VHS on August 15, 2000.
