= Peter Seidman =

American lecturer, educator, and talent scout

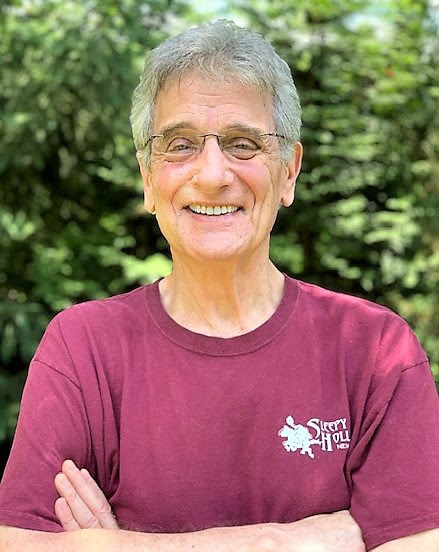
- Peter Seidman in 2020
- Born: April 3, 1949 (age 77); New York City
- Education: Ed.M.
- Alma mater: Harvard University
- Occupations: Specialist, Talent Discovery & Development

Peter Seidman is a New York-based lecturer, educator and talent scout. Seidman is the founder of the Seidman Academy, and has presented lectures for the past forty years on child development, education, and the arts.

== Early life and education ==
Seidman was born on April 3, 1949, in New York City. His father, Harold, was a public elementary school principal and his mother, Sybil, taught special needs students at New York’s Bellevue Hospital.

Seidman began to study piano at 6, and at 12, he auditioned and was awarded a merit-based scholarship to the Juilliard School of Music, where he studied classical piano and music theory.

In 1965, while trying to interview Martin Luther King Jr. for the New Rochelle, New York, chapter of the Congress of Racial Equality, 16-year-old Seidman was arrested at King's hotel in Philadelphia. In 1970, while a student at the University of Hartford, he was part of a group called Concerned Connecticut Citizens for Sincere Dialogue and participated in a demonstration against a visit by Spiro Agnew. Also while a student, he wrote several articles published in the university newspaper UH News addressing racism, the environment, and other controversial issues of the time.

He studied education, psychology, and theater arts at the University of Hartford and University of Massachusetts Boston and was admitted to the Harvard University Graduate School of Education based on a theater arts program for disadvantaged children and teens he developed at a youth center in Boston. He earned a Master's degree in Education (Ed.M.) from Harvard in 1978. Seidman's contributions to the youth center in Boston were chronicled by the center's founder, Fred Rosene, in a self-published memoir, Making a Difference.

== Career ==
After he graduated from Harvard, Seidman moved back to the New York area. In 1981 he founded and directed a vocal showcase in New York "Professional Children's Revue," where he worked with young actors appearing in films, TV, commercials and voiceovers, including a teenage Sarah Jessica Parker, Justin Henry, Ricky Schroder, Lori Loughlin and most of the child actors appearing in the original casts of Broadway's Annie and Evita, and the revival of Peter Pan.

The Professional Children's Revue

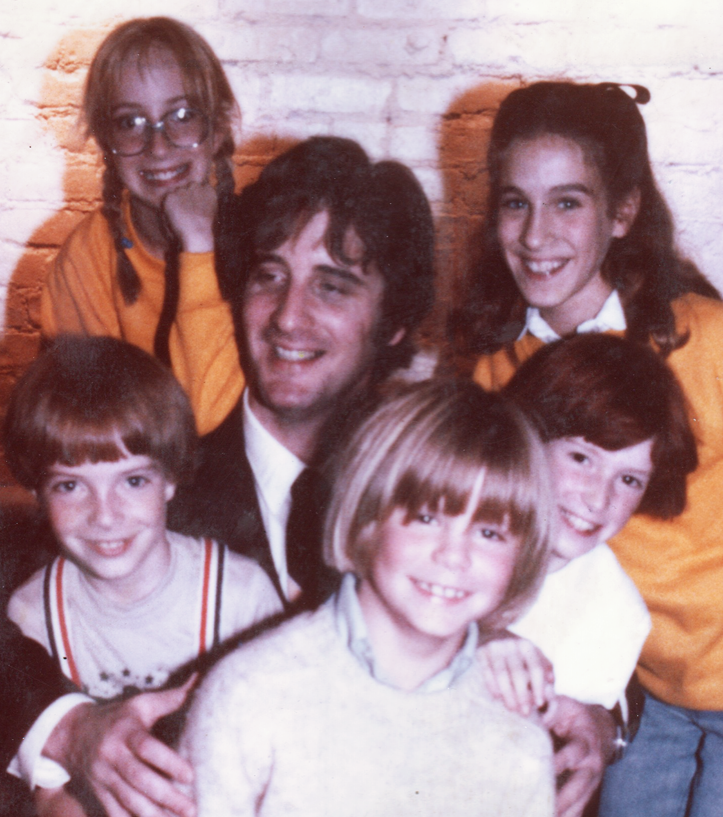
Peter Seidman in 1981 with (clockwise from front): Justin Henry, Jon Ward, Liz Ward, Sarah Jessica Parker, Allison Smith

In 1983, Seidman began to speak on the connection between child development and the arts. His talks evolved into a series of lectures, presented several months each year to high schools and performing arts venues throughout the United States and Canada. Topics include the role of self-esteem and health in achieving success in the professional performing arts field.

His work with professional children evolved into a yearly resident performing arts workshop "Beginnings", which he founded in 1984. The program evolved into the Seidman Academy which provides training in acting, voice, dance, and writing by working New York casting directors, talent agents, Broadway and TV/film actors, playwrights, vocal coaches, and choreographers, and culminates in an Off Broadway showcase at the Orpheum Theatre, Union Square Theater, and other New York City theater locations. Mischa Barton, Reese Witherspoon, Zachery Ty Bryan, Hunter Parrish, Kirsten Storms, and thousands of other actors have attended the Academy.

In 1995 Samuel French, Inc. published a collection of monologues containing dramatic and comedy pieces written by Seidman, entitled Winning Monologues from the Beginnings Workshop, with additional pieces written by actor and writer, Mark Weston, a former instructor at Beginnings.

In 2004, the Academy began offering training with the Royal Shakespeare Company in Stratford-upon-Avon, as well as classes with industry professionals from British television, film, and theater, including performers and directors from London's West End and the Royal National Theatre.

In 2008, Seidman began a series of yearly workshops in Hollywood, California. Students currently work with on-set coaches including Marnie Cooper (students have included Miley Cyrus, Mila Kunis, Miranda Cosgrove, Olivia Holt, and others) as well as talent agents, film and television casting directors, and actors.

In the late 1990s, Seidman began writing an original musical which he intended to produce on Broadway entitled The Kid Who Played the Palace. The project is still in development.
