= Danielle Steel's 'Palomino' =

1991 American television movie

- Genre: Drama; Romance
- Based on: Palomino by Danielle Steel
- Directed by: Michael Miller
- Starring: Lindsay Frost; Lee Horsley; Rod Taylor; Eva Marie Saint
- Music by: Dominic Frontiere
- Country of origin: United States
- Original language: English

Production
- Executive producer: Douglas S. Cramer
- Cinematography: Lloyd Ahern II
- Editor: Michael S. McLean
- Running time: 95 min.
- Production companies: The Cramer Company; NBC Productions

Original release
- Network: NBC
- Release: October 21, 1991

Danielle Steel's Palomino is a 1991 American made-for-television romantic drama film based on a 1981 novel by Danielle Steel about the romance between a photographer and a cowboy. A subplot involves a romance between characters played by Rod Taylor and Eva Marie Saint, who acted together years earlier in Raintree County (1957) and 36 Hours (1964). The film aired on October 21, 1991 on NBC.

== See also ==
- List of films about horses
