= True Heart =

- Directed by: Catherine Cyran
- Written by: Catherine Cyran
- Produced by: Jeffrey D. Ivers; Brad Krevoy; R.J. Murillo; Steve Stabler
- Starring: Kirsten Dunst; Zachery Ty Bryan; August Schellenberg
- Cinematography: Christopher Baffa
- Edited by: Michael Schweitzer
- Music by: Eric Allaman
- Distributed by: Orion Pictures
- Release date: June 15, 1999 (US)
- Running time: 92 min

True Heart is a 1999 American adventure film directed by Catherine Cyran and starring Kirsten Dunst as Bonnie and Zachery Ty Bryan as Sam.

== Plot summary ==
True Heart tells the story of a brother and sister who survive a plane crash that kills the pilot and their guardian and strands them in British Columbia's wilderness. They are rescued by an Aboriginal Canadian man named Khonanesta (August Schellenberg) who claims there are "bad people" (a group of bear poachers) in the forest and tells them they must get away. He leads them on a trip through the wilderness away from poachers to find their parents.

The children are eventually reunited with their parents (Michael Gross and Dey Young), who then mistakenly accuse Khonanesta of being a poacher. The man refers to "Grandfather" a bear, as a member of his people. The children clear him of the accusation.

== Reception ==
DVD & Movie Guide gave the movie three-and-a-half stars, saying that it was "perfect for family viewing".
