= Deadly Affairs =

American documentary TV series (2012–2014)

- Genre: Documentary
- Presented by: Susan Lucci
- Country of origin: United States
- Original language: English
- No. of seasons: 3
- No. of episodes: 36

Production
- Executive producers: Chris Nusbaum; Pamela Deutsch; Rebecca Toth Diefenbach; Valerie Haselton Drescher
- Running time: 42 minutes
- Production company: Sirens Media

Original release
- Network: Investigation Discovery
- Release: September 8, 2012 – November 20, 2014

Deadly Affairs is an American documentary television series on Investigation Discovery that aired between September 28, 2012, and November 20, 2014. The series tells true stories of love affairs that ended up deadly and is hosted by actress Susan Lucci. Deadly Affairs was renewed for a second season in November 2012, with the premiere on August 3, 2013. The series was renewed for a third and final season that premiered in 2014.

== Episodes ==
| Season | Episodes | Season premiere | Season finale |
|---|---|---|---|
| 1 | 10 | September 8, 2012 | November 10, 2012 |
| 2 | 13 | August 3, 2013 | October 26, 2013 |
| 3 | 13 | August 14, 2014 | November 20, 2014 |

=== Season 1 (2012) ===
| No. overall | No. in season | Title | Original release date |
|---|---|---|---|
| 1 | 1 | "In Too Deep" | September 8, 2012 |
| 2 | 2 | "Fatal Finale" | September 15, 2012 |
| 3 | 3 | "Battle of the Sexes" | September 22, 2012 |
| 4 | 4 | "Lust for the Job" | September 29, 2012 |
| 5 | 5 | "Lethal Acquisition" | October 6, 2012 |
| 6 | 6 | "Deadly Obsession" | October 13, 2012 |
| 7 | 7 | "Killer Ambition" | October 20, 2012 |
| 8 | 8 | "Sudden Death" | October 27, 2012 |
| 9 | 9 | "Predator or Prey" | November 3, 2012 |
| 10 | 10 | "Love Thy Neighbor" | November 10, 2012 |

=== Season 2 (2013) ===
| No. overall | No. in season | Title | Original release date |
|---|---|---|---|
| 11 | 1 | "A Fool's Bet" | August 3, 2013 |
| 12 | 2 | "School of Deceit" | August 10, 2013 |
| 13 | 3 | "Driven by Desire" | August 17, 2013 |
| 14 | 4 | "Generous Betrayal" | August 24, 2013 |
| 15 | 5 | "Achilles Heel" | August 31, 2013 |
| 16 | 6 | "Tall, Dark and Dangerous" | September 7, 2013 |
| 17 | 7 | "You Reap What You Sow" | September 14, 2013 |
| 18 | 8 | "Recipe for Disaster" | September 21, 2013 |
| 19 | 9 | "Special Delivery" | September 28, 2013 |
| 20 | 10 | "Fool Me Once" | October 5, 2013 |
| 21 | 11 | "Love Is a Battlefield" | October 12, 2013 |
| 22 | 12 | "Skeletons in the Closet" | October 19, 2013 |
| 23 | 13 | "Women on Top" | October 26, 2013 |

=== Season 3 (2014) ===
| No. overall | No. in season | Title | Original release date |
|---|---|---|---|
| 24 | 1 | "Spellbound" | August 16, 2014 |
| 25 | 2 | "Swan Song" | August 23, 2014 |
| 26 | 3 | "Burned by Desire" | August 30, 2014 |
| 27 | 4 | "Blood Ties" | September 6, 2014 |
| 28 | 5 | "Bound and Determined" | September 13, 2014 |
| 29 | 6 | "Playing with Hearts" | September 13, 2014 |
| 30 | 7 | "The Art of Murder" | September 20, 2014 |
| 31 | 8 | "Games People Play" | November 6, 2014 |
| 32 | 9 | "Virtual Lust" | November 6, 2014 |
| 33 | 10 | "Runaway Murder" | November 13, 2014 |
| 34 | 11 | "Three to Tango" | November 13, 2014 |
| 35 | 12 | "Drowned by Love" | November 20, 2014 |
| 36 | 13 | "To Catch a Cheat" | November 20, 2014 |
