= Rashaan Nall =

American actor

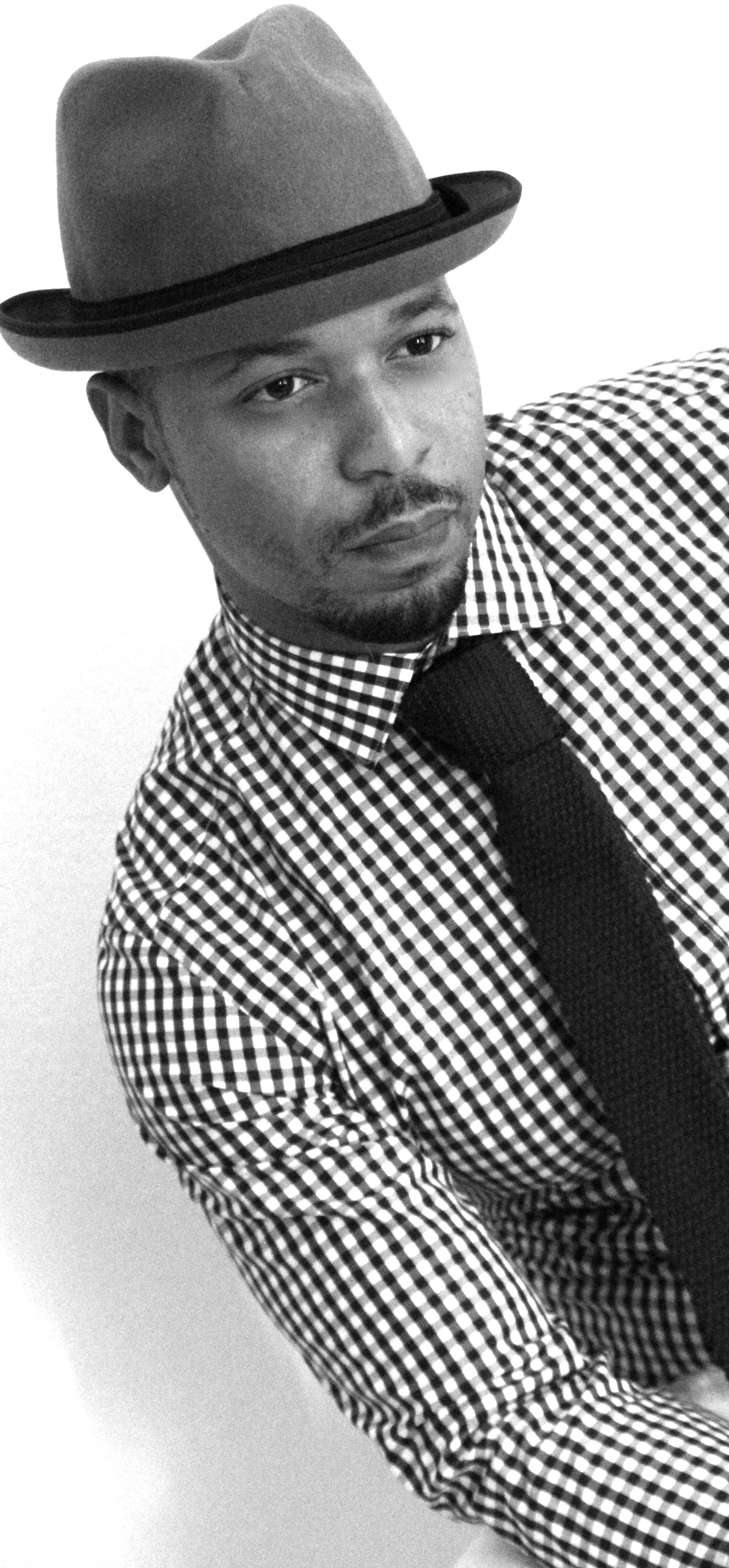
- Born: February 25, 1980 (age 46); Altadena, California, U.S.
- Other names: Harvey Arnal, R.Nall, Ra Cinematic
- Education: California State University at Northridge
- Occupations: Actor, writer, director
- Years active: 1995–present

Rashaan Harvey Nall (born February 25, 1980) is an American writer, director, screenwriter and actor of stage and screen.

== Early life ==
Rashaan Nall was born in 1980 the Greater Los Angeles, California, and was raised in Altadena, California. He attended South Pasadena High School, wherein he played starting Tailback for the football team. He later attended John Muir High School in Altadena, California, and was subsequently accepted into Los Angeles County High School for the Arts. After graduating, Nall attended California State University at Northridge while continuing to pursue his dream in entertainment.

== Career ==
=== Acting ===
Nall made his professional debut as a Voiceover artist on the animated series Captain Planet, as well as television commercials such as McDonald's, Jenga and Toyota, to name a few.

Nall later landed a Regular role as Jared Moore on the Paramount television series Social Studies, a show centered on the students of a wayward upper crust boarding school. Rashaan also recurred on the ABC hit series Hangin' with Mr. Cooper, NBC's Mr. Rhodes, The Bernie Mac Show and CBS mystery drama Cracker.

He appears in Feature films such as HBO's Tyson and Dancing in September, as well as The Walt Disney Company feature film principal. As well as Fakin' the Funk, Tin Soldier and many others while continuing to Guest Star on shows such as Touched by an Angel, Sister, Sister and Without a Trace. Nall additionally Guest starred in Emmy-nominated series Standoff and Blind Justice, along with Emmy winning series’ such as NYPD Blue, and ER.

Nall etched his own brand of edgy comedy in memorable roles such as Stray Bullet in the 5th instalment of the Leprechaun franchise, Leprechaun in the Hood. Nall played the unassuming anti-hero Floyd in Snipes and as hard-bodied Ronald in star-studded movie classic The Wash. Nall credits his experience on The Wash with inspiring his love for stand-up comedy.

Nall avoided being typecast and earned a reputation for intensive study character work, on the Emmy award-winning series The Shield and the VH1 Feature film drama Play'd: A Hip Hop Story, starring opposite Toni Braxton.

Nall made another comedic departure and landed the recurring role of Walt Powell a barber/stand-up comedian on UPN hit One on One and a regular on its spinoff series Cuts.

Nall then landed a Recurring role as Daryl on the critically acclaimed IFC series The Minor Accomplishments of Jackie Woodman.

Nall took another dramatic turn as Cloudy in Spoken Words with writer/director of Oscar-winning film Ulee's Gold, Victor Nuñez.

=== Writing ===
Rashaan Nall is one of the original poets of Los Angeles' "The Poetry Lounge". His screenplay The Pyn was a screenwriting finalist for HBO-sponsored Urbanworld film festival in 2007. Nall also penned screenplays Menage' Noir and Jesus Lovin' Buddhist, for which he wrote, produced, directed, and edited.

=== Directing ===
Nall's first directorial work was theatrical re-telling of Sam Shepard's first act of Geography of a Horse Dreamer at Los Angeles's State playhouse. Nall also directed Spaghetti Western satire Jesus Lovin Buddhist, and the music video Grrr for hip-hop Artist Philly Swain under the pseudonym Ra Cinematic.

=== Editing ===
Nall first began editing by sneaking into the editing bay of Otis College of Art and Design with a roommate and Otis student. Nall's first official short was entitled film Menage' Noir starring Crank: High Voltage's Julanne Chidi Hill and Amour Infinity's Jamie Burton Oare. Rashaan edited his rethinking of a spaghetti western Jesus Lovin Buddhist, a satirical film exploring religion and race in a small town bar. The film stars Dominic Bogart, Blake Robbins and Julanne Chidi Hill.

In December 2011, Rashaan also edited on special production projects for fashion maven Christian Audigier.

== Personal life ==
He currently resides between Los Angeles, CA, and Paris, France.

=== Spirituality ===
Rashaan Nall is from a Christian Baptist background and practices Kundalini yoga and Vipassana meditation.

=== Charity ===
Nall volunteered as an assistant teacher at Marvin Avenue Elementary School with the nonprofit organization Equal Opportunity Productions (EqOp), an arts organization. Rashaan also served a three-year stint as assistant teacher at Faith acting studios and assistant teacher at All About Kids Acting conservatory.

== Filmography ==
- Spoken Word (2009) ... Cloudy
- Without a Trace (2007) ... Evan Bingham
- Standoff (2006) ... Jesse Roberts
- The Minor Accomplishments of Jackie Woodman (2006) ... Darryl
- Cuts (2005–2006) ... Walt Powell
- Blind Justice (2005) ... Titus Oliver
- One on One (2002–2004) ... Walt Powell
- The Shield (2004) ... Tobar
- Play'd: A Hip Hop Story (2002) ... Jaxx
- The Wash (2001) ... Ronald
- Devil's Prey (2001) ... Joe
- Snipes (2001) ... Floyd
- Nash Bridges (2001) ... Rafael Watson
- Something to Sing About (2000) ... G Smooth
- Leprechaun in the Hood (2000) ... Stray Bullet
- 3 Strikes (2000) ... T-Bird
- Dancing in September (2000) ... Bad Actor
- Inferno (1998) ... Lewis
- NYPD Blue (1998) ... Donny
- Cracker (1998) ... Darin Watlington
- Principal Takes a Holiday (1998) ... Peter Heath (as Rashaan H. Nall)
- Sister, Sister (1997) ... Lil Dawg
- Touched by an Angel (1997) ... Lightning
- Social Studies (1997) ... Jared Moore
- Fakin' Da Funk (1997) ... Perry Lee
- Mr. Rhodes (1996) ... Lucas
- ER (1996) ... Brett
- Hangin' with Mr. Cooper (1995) ... Young Mark
- The Tin Soldier (1995) ... Pack Kid
- The Parent 'Hood (1995) ... Kwame
- Tyson (1995) ... Dog
