= The Woman Who Sinned =

- Genre: Drama
- Screenplay by: Denne Petitclerc
- Story by: Stu Samuels
- Directed by: Michael Switzer
- Starring: Susan Lucci; Tim Matheson
- Music by: David Kurtz
- Country of origin: United States
- Original language: English

Production
- Executive producer: Stu Samuels
- Producer: Susan Weber-Gold
- Production location: Los Angeles
- Cinematography: Denis Lewiston
- Editor: Neil Mandelberg
- Running time: 100 minutes
- Production companies: Samuels Film Company; World International Network

Original release
- Network: ABC
- Release: November 17, 1991

The Woman Who Sinned is a 1991 American television film directed by Michael Switzer and starring Susan Lucci and Tim Matheson. It was later released in 1992 by Genesis Home Video (UK) as a home video titled Mortal Passion (run time 90 minutes).

== Plot ==
Victoria Robeson (Lucci) and her husband Michael (Matheson) are an apparently happily married couple. However Victoria becomes involved in an adulterous affair with Evan Ganns (Dudikoff) who later kills her friend Jane Woodman. Victoria is falsely accused of the murder and is forced to reveal details of her affair to prove her innocence.

== Cast ==
- Susan Lucci as Victoria Robeson
- Tim Matheson as Michael Robeson
- Michael Dudikoff as Evan Ganns
- John Vernon as Lt. Girvetz, police lieutenant in charge of the murder investigation
- Clayton Landey as Larry
- Christina Belford as Randy Emerson, a private detective
- Lenore Kasdorf as Jane Woodman
- Tom Everett as a police sergeant
- Dick Miller as Thomas, a police detective
- Claudia Christian as Judy Reinhardt

== Reception ==
The film received negative reviews. According to Joanna Berry in the Radio Times (on line), "More time seems to have been spent on Lucci's wardrobe and hairdo than on the plot" and Hal Erickson at AllMovie wrote that the film was a "melodramatic farrago" for which "the publicity people did their best to suggest that The Woman Who Sinned was reminiscent of Fatal Attraction, simply because both films involved a clandestine love affair and a psycho killer".
