= Liza Huber =

American television actress (born 1975)

- Born: Liza Victoria Huber; February 22, 1975 (age 51); Long Island, New York, U.S.
- Occupation: Actress
- Years active: 1995–2008
- Spouse: Alex Hesterberg (m. 2004)
- Children: 4
- Parent(s): Helmut Huber; Susan Lucci

Liza Victoria Huber (born February 22, 1975) is an American former television actress, best known for her role as Gwen Hotchkiss on the daytime soap Passions. She is the daughter of actress Susan Lucci.

In 2008, she retired from acting to spend time with her family.

== Career ==
Huber appeared with her mother in a 1993 Ford Motor Company advertisement. Huber's television debut was an uncredited role in Lifetime's original movie, Ebbie (1995), which starred her mother.

In 1999, Huber was announced as a cast member in the new NBC daytime soap Passions. She left the show in 2000, when she announced she was quitting acting to return to New York and be near her fiancé at the time.

In 2000, she was named Miss Golden Globe, an honor the Golden Globe Awards show gives each year to the daughter of a celebrity. Huber was asked to return to Passions in 2002, after her replacement Natalie Zea chose to depart the role of Gwen when her contract ended.

Huber starred in and co-produced the play Four Dogs and a Bone at the Harold Clurman Theater in New York City, as part of her student acting requirements. For a week in October 2003, she appeared on the game show Hollywood Squares.

== Personal life ==
Liza met her future husband Alex Hesterberg in first grade; they married in 2004. Liza and her family, which includes four children, reside in Wayland, Massachusetts. In 2011, Liza founded the company Sage Spoonfuls.
