= Play'd: A Hip Hop Story =

2002 television film directed by Oz Scott

- DVD cover
- Written by: Cory Tynan
- Directed by: Oz Scott
- Starring: Rashaan Nall; Toni Braxton; Faizon Love; Sharissa; Clifton Powell; Merlin Santana
- Narrated by: Rahsaan Nall
- Theme music composer: Kurt Farquhar
- Country of origin: United States
- Original language: English

Production
- Producer: Bill Borden
- Cinematography: Keith Smith
- Editor: James Wilcox
- Running time: 87 minutes

Original release
- Release: June 26, 2002

Play'd: A Hip Hop Story is a 2002 television drama film starring Rashaan Nall, Faizon Love, Toni Braxton, Sharissa, Clifton Powell, and Merlin Santana. The film was directed by Oz Scott.

== Plot ==
Rising East Coast rap star Jaxx has formed a musical partnership with longtime buddy Mayhem. Domino Breed, a ruthless CEO of Da Block Records, a West Coast label, is filling Jaxx's head with promises of solo stardom and innumerable creature comforts (not all of them legal), Domino lures the young performer to California. As he becomes immersed in the gangster lifestyle common to so many of Domino's disciples, Jaxx grows distant from his friends and loved ones, especially his wife Shonda, who had originally been in favor of her husband's career move. Inevitably, the greed-dictated rivalry between Jaxx and his former partner Mayhem culminates in tragedy.

== Cast ==
- Rashaan Nall as "Jaxx"
- Toni Braxton as Shonda
- Faizon Love as "Domino Breed"
- Clifton Powell as Oz
- Sharissa as Yanesha
- Merlin Santana as "Mayhem"
- Lawrence B. Adisa as "Bangs"
- Phillip Bolden as Jimmy "Little Jimmy"
- Laurence Brown as Benard
- DeRay Davis as Robin
- Chris Pape as Bodyguard
- Jacory Gums as "Dooz"
- Craig Robinson as Cole
- Enoch Harris as Singer
- Maurice Welch as Singer
- Frankie Richards as Singer
- Dex Elliot Sanders as "Skeem"
