= Ebbie =

1995 television film directed by George Kaczender

- Also known as: Miracle at Christmas: Ebbie's Story
- Genre: Drama; Fantasy
- Written by: Paul Redford; Ed Redlich
- Directed by: George Kaczender
- Starring: Susan Lucci; Wendy Crewson; Ron Lea; Molly Parker; Taran Noah Smith
- Music by: Lawrence Shragge
- Countries of origin: Canada; United States
- Original language: English

Production
- Executive producer: Jean Abounader
- Producer: Harold Tichenor
- Editor: Roger Mattiussi
- Running time: 96 minutes
- Production companies: Crescent Entertainment; Maverick Productions; Victor Television Productions

Original release
- Network: Lifetime
- Release: 4 December 1995

Ebbie or Miracle at Christmas: Ebbie's Story is a 1995 American television film directed by George Kaczender, written by Ed Redlich, and starring Susan Lucci in the title role. It is a gender-reversed retelling of the 1843 novella A Christmas Carol by Charles Dickens, with a hard-hearted female character named Elizabeth "Ebbie" Scrooge in place of the miserly Ebenezer Scrooge, and the three spirits that come to visit Ebbie resemble three of her employees whom she had been overly rude towards that day.

It premiered on December 4, 1995 on Lifetime Television.

== Plot ==
Businesswoman Elizabeth "Ebbie" Scrooge never loved Christmas. Rude and disrespectful, she doesn't give to the needy, nor does she care about her employees at Dobson's, the department store she owns. She also works on Christmas, and advises her employees to do the same.

On Christmas Eve, while working at Dobson's department store, Ebbie rudely dismisses two employees who are promoting perfume; she gives a very low "bonus" to a gift-wrapping employee named Rita who works two jobs, and she heartlessly fires a security guard named Luther for not being in the right place at the right time, much to his dismay.

That night, after returning home, Ebbie encounters the ghost of her late business partner Jake Marley, who had died a year before. Marley's ghost transitions from one television program to another, then brings Ebbie back to Dobson's which has been closed for the night, where he appears right next to her. In the afterlife, Jake Marley is forced to continuously answer calls from God by using a Motorola cellphone, while wandering the earth as a punishment for his greed and selfishness in life. He tells Ebbie that she will be having three "appointments" at very specific times during the very early morning hours, which will try to help Ebbie change her ways and save her from being condemned to the same terrible afterlife as that of Marley. Ebbie scoffs at Marley's warnings, considering his visit to be a dream.

At exactly 12:01 a.m., the first "appointment" - the Ghosts of Christmas Past - appear, taking the form of the two Dobson's employees who were promoting perfume earlier that day. They show her the Christmases which she has celebrated in her past, particularly the year her sister Francine died after nearly miscarrying her niece; Ebbie believes that Francine would have survived had she not left her alone to attend a party. That same year, Ebbie met Paul, who became her boyfriend. The Ghosts show Ebbie other, ensuing Christmases: Paul broke up with Ebbie because she valued her work over their relationship, Ebbie and Marley took over Dobson's, and finally Marley’s death. Ebbie then finds herself back in the deserted Dobson's, and tries to regather her thoughts.

At 1:11 a.m., the second "appointment" - the Ghost of Christmas Present - appears, taking the appearance of Rita, who is wearing a dress made out of wrapping paper. She shows Ebbie the life of her widowed assistant Roberta Cratchett, her teenage daughter Martha, and her young son Tim, the latter of which is physically disabled. Next, Ebbie sees the party that she is invited to every year by her niece, but has always declined; everyone toasts Ebbie, but her niece does not drink because she is pregnant. Ebbie sees Paul and his new family. When the Ghost brings Ebbie back to the deserted Dobson's, she shows Ebbie Ignorance and Poverty, in the form of feral homeless children, and throws all of Ebbie's harsh words back at her and then vanishes, leaving Ebbie confused and afraid.

At 02:15 a.m, the third "appointment" - the Ghost of Christmas Future - appears, bearing the appearance of Luther, who is completely silent and still. The Ghost shows Ebbie a terrible future: Tim has died, Dobson's department store is shut down, and Ebbie's future self is hit by a car, but due to her rudeness, she is never visited in the hospital. Having lost all of her possessions, Ebbie dies flat broke, unremembered and unloved. Finally convinced to change this terrible future, Ebbie promises to change her ways if she is allowed to return to the present, which she is.

Ebbie wakes up in her bedroom in her apartment, revealing that all these events were merely a long dream. Pleasantly shocked that she is alive, Ebbie resolves to become a better person. She shocks people close to her with her sudden peppiness; she bids good morning to the doorman, orders a large turkey for the Cratchetts, donates money to help impoverished children, and buys a coat for a homeless woman to whom she also offers a job. Ebbie gives a well-deserved raise to Rita - who is the second Ghost in its human form - so that Rita will no longer need to work her second job, and gives a hard-earned promotion to Roberta. Finally, Ebbie attends the party her niece has been inviting her to. She hires back Luther - who is the third Ghost in its human form -, and lastly enjoys dinner with the Cratchetts at their house.

== Cast ==
- Susan Lucci as Elizabeth "Ebbie" Scrooge
- Wendy Crewson as Roberta "Robbie" Cratchett
- Ron Lea as Paul
- Molly Parker as Francine "Frannie", Mother and Daughter
- Lorena Gale as Rita / Ghost of Christmas Present
- Jennifer Clement as First Perfume-Selling Employee / Ghost of Christmas Past #1
- Nicole Parker as Second Perfume-Selling Employee / Ghost of Christmas Past #2
- Susan Hogan as Mrs. Dobson
- Kevin McNulty as Mr. Dobson
- Taran Noah Smith as Tim "Tiny Tim" Cratchett
- Jeffrey DeMunn as Jake Marley
- Adrienne Carter as Little Ebbie
- Bill Croft as Luther / Ghost of Christmas Yet to Come
- Elan Ross Gibson as Homeless Woman
- Laura Harris as Martha Cratchett
- Sarah Hayward as Nurse #2
- Maria Herrera as Nurse #1
- Gary Jones as Floor Manager
- Tamsin Kelsey as Mrs. Taylor
- Karin Konoval as Ebbie's Mother
- David Lovgren as Michael
- Tom McBeath as Van Munson
- Hrothgar Mathews as Ralph
- Larry Musser as Ebbie's Father
- Malcolm Stewart as Patterson
- Carolyn Adair as Pregnant Friend
- Liza Huber as 70's Girl (uncredited)
- Tong Lung as Vietnamese Store Owner (uncredited)
- Trevor Lawrence Young as Caroler (uncredited)

== Reception ==
Television critic Lynne Heffley from Los Angeles Times gave it a positive review writing: "Soap queen Susan Lucci of “All My Children” is fun to watch as a severely tailored, unsmiling boss, spreading misery wherever she goes on Christmas Eve, whether firing a security guard or deciding the store’s traditional window display has got to go."

== See also ==
- Adaptations of A Christmas Carol
- List of Christmas films
