= Sharissa =

American singer, born 1975

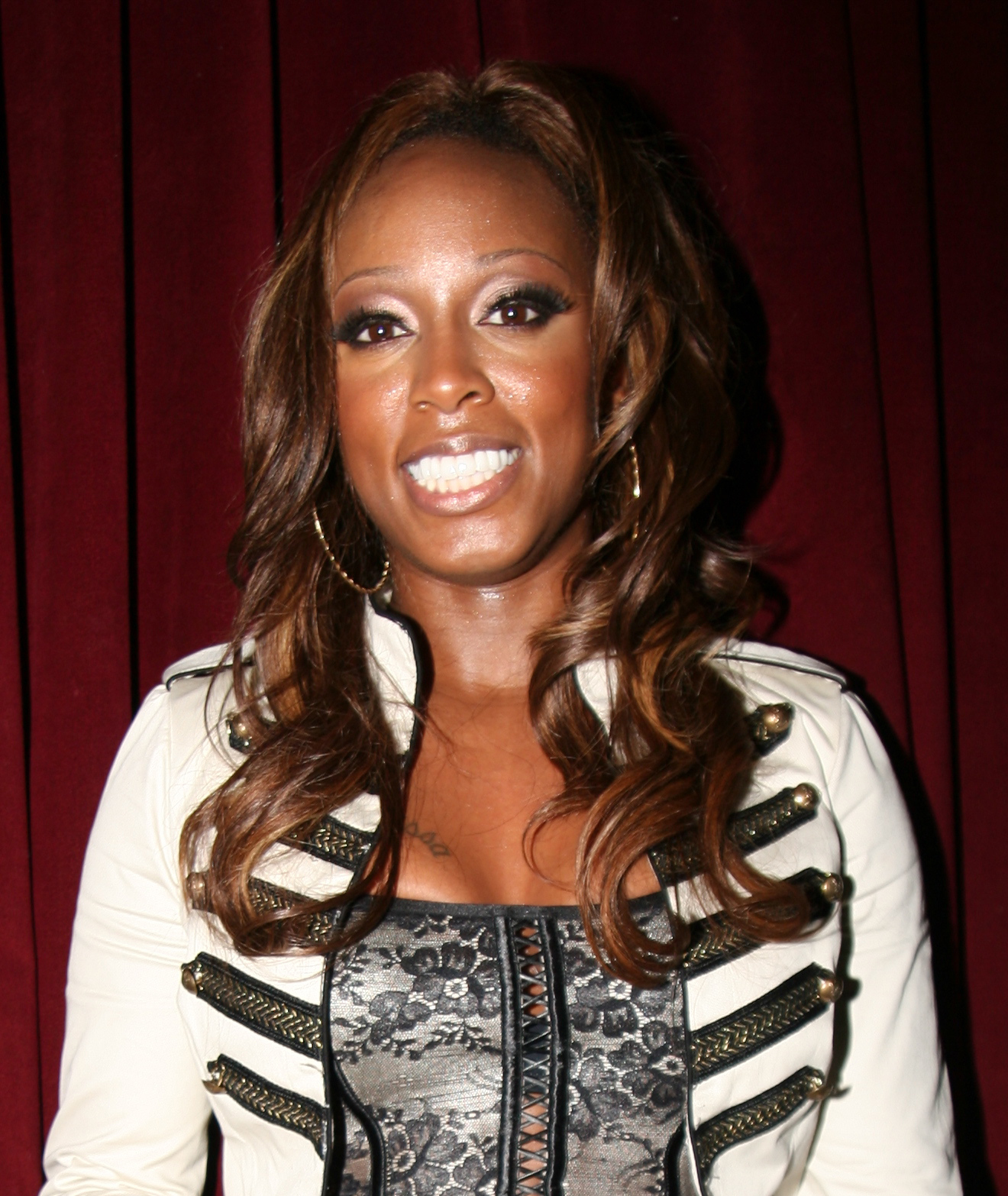
- Sharissa in 2005

Background information
- Born: Sharissa Dawes; August 21, 1975 (age 51); Brooklyn, New York, United States
- Genres: R&B, hip hop
- Occupations: Singer, songwriter
- Labels: Motown, Virgin

Sharissa Dawes (born August 21, 1975) is an American singer. Born in New York City's borough of Brooklyn, Bronx raised, she began her musical career in the R&B group 4KaST. 4KaST released their 1998 debut album, Any Weather, on RCA Records, which was promoted with the singles "Miss My Lovin'" and "I Tried". After her time in the groups, Sharissa worked as a backing vocalist before she signed to Henchman/Motown Records.

Her debut solo album, No Half Steppin (2002), peaked at number 44 on the Billboard 200 chart. Several of its songs appeared on other Billboard charts. Sharissa was featured the soundtrack of the 2003 romantic comedy film, Love Actually. Her second solo album, Every Beat of My Heart (2005), was only released in Japan. The singer has also contributed to several compilation albums, and has been featured on other artists' albums.

== Life and career ==
=== 1975–2001: Early life and career ===
Sharissa Dawes was born on August 21, 1975, in New York City's borough of Brooklyn. She is the oldest of three children. Raised in the Bronx' Edenwald Projects, she became interested in music at age seven. When Sharissa was about 13, she performed with neighborhood children and sang in her school cafeteria. She was influenced by her mother's music collection (which included Deniece Williams and Patti LaBelle), and recorded and studied televised music specials. Sharissa's father nicknamed her "Little Stevie Wonder". Growing up, she felt pressure within the community: "People expected me to do nothing but have babies and depend on the system. I fought through all that."

Sharissa joined the group Triple Dose as a teenager, and became part of the "urban vocal quartet" 4Kast in 1995. 4Kast released their debut album, Any Weather on October 13, 1998, on RCA Records. Its lead single, "Miss My Lovin'", features Mic Geronimo. Released as the second single on August 21, 1998, "I Tried" reached number 46 on the Hot R&B/Hip-Hop Songs Billboard chart on October 10, 1998. It remained on the chart for 12 weeks. To promote the album, the group performed as part of a fundraiser at Madison Square Garden.

Sharissa contributed "Bring Out The Freak" (featuring ILL Bread) to the 1996 compilation album, The Ultimate Mix. The following year, she released the solo single "Keep It Simple" through Emotive Music. Sharissa became a backing vocalist for a number of singers, including Wyclef Jean, Beanie Sigel, Father MC, and Carl Thomas. Three of her songs appeared on the 2001 compilation album, Bullet Proof Love, Vol. 1: "Money Ain't Gonna Change Us" (including verses from The Prodigy and Bars-N-Hooks), "Gone 2 Long", and "I Can't Wait". Sharissa was also featured on Carl Thomas' "Cold, Cold Wind", on the compilation album BMG Dance Compilation #69, that year.

=== 2002: No Half Steppin ===
Jimmy Henchman discovered Sharissa in November 2002. Her 2002 debut album, No Half Steppin', was released through Henchmen and Motown on February 26 of that year. Ayana Byrd of Vibe called its sound a "brand of gritty, hip hop-influenced R&B, and its lyrics revolve around tales of love, heartbreak, and independence"; according to Bryce Wilson, the album was inspired by 1970s music. Jason Birchmeier of AllMusic identified No Half Steppin' as part of Motown's attempt "to break new artists into the urban market", and the label was presenting Sharissa in a style similar to Mary J. Blige and Aaliyah. Other music critics also compared the singer to Blige.

The album received mainly-positive reviews, although some criticized its production. It peaked at number 44 on the Billboard 200 chart on March 16, 2002 (remaining on the chart for 10 weeks), number seven on the Top R&B/Hip-Hop Albums Billboard chart and number 44 on the Top Album Sales Billboard chart. Sharissa performed material from the album at the Blazin' Hip-Hop and R&B Concert in Pittsburgh on June 16, 2002, and released a mixtape version.

"Any Other Night"'s music video was "the story of a woman getting her groove back after being neglected by her man". The single peaked at number 72 on the Billboard Hot 100 chart on April 6, 2002, remaining on the chart for 14 weeks. It reached number 21 on the Adult R&B Songs Billboard chart, number 23 on the R&B/Hip-Hop Airplay, number 23 on the Hot R&B/Hip-Hop Songs, and number 70 on the Radio Songs Billboard charts. The album's title track was also released as a single, and was promoted with a video. It peaked at number 75 on the R&B/Hip-Hop Airplay and number 78 on the Hot R&B/Hip-Hop Songs Billboard charts. The third (and final) single from the album was "I Can't Wait".

Sharissa was featured on "You Say Keep It Gangsta" with Butch Cassidy on Wyclef Jean's third studio album, Masquerade, which was released on June 18, 2002. The singer featured on The Ranjahz's "Animal Life", from the album Say What You Say, that year. (Note: "Animal Life" was also included on The Ranjahz's 2015 album Missing Ingredient under the title "Animall Life".) She also played Yanesha in the 2002 television film, Play'd: A Hip Hop Story. Sociology professor Geoff Harkness wrote in a 2015 article that Yanesha is an example of the bad-girl archetype, which he defined as "sexually insatiable females who emphasize their physical attributes and downplay other aspects of their identity".

=== 2003–present: Every Beat of My Heart and continued career ===
On November 11, 2003, Sharissa contributed "Take Me as I Am" to the soundtrack of the 2003 romantic comedy film Love Actually; it features Wyclef Jean. (Note: "Take Me as I Am" was also featured on Sharissa's second studio album Every Beat of My Heart and Jean's fourth studio album The Preacher's Son.) An accompanying music video was released. The song peaked at number 96 on the Hot R&B/Hip-Hop Songs Billboard chart. Baria A. Razzaq of Vibe criticized the song: "Wyclef Jean misleads her into regurgitating one of his ditties from The Carnival era". Sharissa attended the film's New York City premiere.

EMI Music Japan and Virgin released her second album, Every Beat of My Heart, in Japan on October 25, 2005. The album was originally scheduled for a full release on September 27 of that year. Sharissa has co-writing credits on all its songs, and said about the process: "I can't sing about things that I haven't experienced, so it was important for me to work with producers who understood my struggle." Baria A. Razzaq praised the album for the collaborations with R. Kelly and Millie Jackson.

Singles from the album were "I'm In Love With a Thug", featuring R. Kelly, and "I Got Love". The track "You Can Do Better featuring R&B singer Tank" reached number 28 on the Adult R&B Songs Billboard chart. Before Every Beat of My Heart, Sharissa had released "Guess Who's Back", "See If I Won't", "You Make It Easy", "I'm Heat" and "Drop on Me" as singles. "I'm Heat" features verses by The Game, and "Drop on Me" includes verses by The Notorious B.I.G.

Sharissa designed a MaDame Bluez & Co. line of "street couture" in 2005 and participated in the reality competition show, Survive This! She performed at a Masonic Temple event in Decatur, Illinois, on February 17, 2006, to increase awareness of HIV/AIDS. Sharissa's song, "Further", was included on the compilation album Dear Summer, Vol. 1 the following year. She released "All or Nuth'n" in 2011 through the Assirahs Music Group. (Note: The Assirahs Music Group had previously published "Take Me as I Am".)

== Discography ==
=== Studio albums ===
Title	Details	Peak chart position		
Title	Details	US	US R&B	US Sales
No Half Steppin'	Released: February 26, 2002; Label: Henchmen, Motown; Formats: CD, digital download	44	7	44
Every Beat of My Heart	Released: October 25, 2005; Label: EMI Music Japan, Virgin; Formats: CD, digital download	—	—	—
"—" denotes a title that did not chart, or was not released in that territory.

=== Mixtape ===
Title	Details
Freestyle Mixtape	Released: 2002; Label: Henchmen; Formats: CD; Notes: Mixtape of No Half Steppin'

=== As lead artist ===
Title	Year	Peak chart position					Album
Title	Year	US	US Adult R&B	US R&B/HH	US Radio	US R&B/HH Airplay	Album
"Keep It Simple"	1996	—	—	—	—	—	Non-album single
"Any Other Night”	2002	72	21	23	70	23	No Half Steppin’
“No Half Steppin’"	2002	—	—	78	—	75	No Half Steppin’
“I Can't Wait”	2002	—	—	—	—	—	No Half Steppin’
"Guess Who's Back"	2005	—	—	—	—	—	Non-album singles
"See If I Won't"	2005	—	—	—	—	—	Non-album singles
"You Make It Easy"	2005	—	—	—	—	—	Non-album singles
"I'm Heat" (featuring The Game)	2005	—	—	—	—	—	Every Beat of My Heart
"Drop on Me" (featuring The Notorious B.I.G.)	2005	—	—	—	—	—	Non-album single
"I'm In Love With a Thug” (featuring R. Kelly)	2005	—	—	—	—	—	Every Beat of My Heart
“I Got Love”	2005	—	—	—	—	—	Every Beat of My Heart
“Further"	2007	—	—	—	—	—	Dear Summer, Vol. 1
"All or Nuth’n"	2011	—	—	—	—	—	Non-album single
"—" denotes a title that did not chart, or was not released in that territory.

=== As featured artist and other appearances ===
Title	Year	Primary performer(s)	Album
"Bring Out The Freak"	1996	ILL Bread	The Ultimate Mix
"Money Ain't Gonna Change Us"	2001	The Prodigy and Bars-N-Hooks	Bullet Proof Love, Vol. 1
"Cold, Cold World"	2001	Carl Thomas	BMG Dance Compilation #69
"You Say Keep It Gangsta”	2002	Butch Cassidy and Wyclef Jean	Masquerade
"Animal Life”	2002	The Ranjahz	Say What You Say
"Take Me as I Am"	2003	Wyclef Jean	Love Actually

=== Other songs ===
Title	Year	Peak chart positions	Album
Title	Year	US Adult R&B	Album
"Gone 2 Long"	2001	—	Bullet Proof Love, Vol. 1
"I Can't Wait"	2001	—	Bullet Proof Love, Vol. 1
"You Can Do Better"	2005	28	Every Beat of My Heart

== Filmography ==
Title	Year	Medium	Role	Notes
Play'd: A Hip Hop Story	2002	Television film	Yanesha	Film debut
Survive This!	2005	TV series	Herself	
