= Zachery Ty Bryan =

American actor (born 1981)

- Born: Zachery Tyler Bryan; October 9, 1981 (age 45); Aurora, Colorado, U.S.
- Other name: Zachery Bryan
- Occupations: Actor, producer
- Years active: 1990–2012, 2022
- Known for: Brad Taylor on Home Improvement
- Spouse: Carly Matros (m. 2007; div. 2020)
- Partner(s): Johnnie Faye (2021–present; engaged)
- Children: 8
- Relatives: Brady Quinn (cousin)

Zachery Tyler Bryan (born October 9, 1981) is an American retired actor and film producer. He is best known for his role as Brad Taylor on the ABC sitcom Home Improvement. He also appeared in the films First Kid and The Fast and the Furious: Tokyo Drift.

== Early life ==
Bryan was born in Aurora, Colorado, to Jenny and Dwight Bryan.

== Career ==
Bryan started off his career by appearing in local print and television advertising in Denver. He then appeared at a showcase in New York City, directed by Peter Seidman, where he was seen by a professional talent representative. This, and his interest in acting, soon brought him to California, where he was cast in the role of Brad, the oldest Taylor child, in the show Home Improvement, a role he played until the series ended in 1999. His character was known for experimenting with different hair styles as well as being the child most often in trouble. He is one month younger than Jonathan Taylor Thomas, who played his younger brother Randy on the show.

In the middle of Home Improvement Bryan made an appearance as Steve on The Fresh Prince of Bel-Air in 1995. After Home Improvement ended, Bryan made brief appearances in many other television shows including (2002) Buffy the Vampire Slayer as Peter Nicols, (2005) Veronica Mars as Caz Truman, and (2006) Shark as Scott Natterson, as well as a guest appearance on an episode of Reading Rainbow. Additionally, he made a cameo appearance on MTV's I Bet You Will in which he portrayed himself and competed in a challenge where he wrestled female convicted felons. In 2001, he portrayed an ice hockey player in an episode of Touched by an Angel. He also appeared on Smallville in 2003 where he played Eric Marsh, a high school baseball player using steroids made from meteor rock. He was the second Home Improvement alum to make a guest appearance on the show after Jonathan Taylor Thomas. In 2005, Bryan appeared as Bryan Nolan in ESPN's TV movie Code Breakers. Bryan also guest starred in Cold Case (as the young murderer in the flashback scenes) and in 2008 as a young man hiring a hitman to kill his stepmother on the show Burn Notice.

Bryan's film roles include the school bully in the 1996 Sinbad comedy First Kid. He starred in the 1995 movie Magic Island as Jack Carlisle, the 1998 TV movie Principal Takes a Holiday, and the 1999 movie True Heart. He also starred as Eric in 1999's The Rage: Carrie 2. Later, he played defender Harry Keough alongside Gerard Butler in the 2005 movie The Game of Their Lives otherwise known as The Miracle Match about the 1950 US upset at the World Cup. In 2006, he played a villain named Clay in The Fast and the Furious: Tokyo Drift, then a deputy in the 2009 TV mini-series Meteor, which aired on NBC. He also played Thor in the made-for-TV Syfy channel film THOR: Hammer of the Gods. The film originally aired on November 29, 2009.

In 2009, Bryan retired from the acting profession. In 2022, Bryan was cast in a small role in The Guardians of Justice.

== Personal life ==
Bryan's cousin is former NFL quarterback Brady Quinn.

On March 10, 2007, he married Carly Matros, whom he met while attending La Cañada High School. They have twin girls born on June 23, 2014, a third daughter born on June 7, 2016, and a son born on March 18, 2019. Bryan and Matros divorced in September 2020 after 13 years of marriage.

On November 17, 2021, Bryan announced his engagement to model Johnnie Faye Cartwright. Bryan and Cartwright have four children: a daughter born in April 2022; twins born in May 2023; and another born in January 2025.

During an arrest in Oklahoma in October 2024, Bryan revealed that he was now "running" from his previous longtime home of California, stating, "I hate that place." Despite leaving the state, Bryan still has residency in La Quinta, California, where he is currently facing a drunk driving related charge.

=== Legal issues ===
In October 2020, Bryan was held on several charges including felony strangulation, misdemeanor charges of fourth-degree assault and interfering with making a police report, after an apparent argument with his girlfriend in their apartment in Lane County, Oregon. In February 2021, Bryan pleaded guilty to two of the charges, menacing and fourth degree assault, while six others were dismissed. He was sentenced to three years of bench probation and ordered to partake in a batterer intervention program and to have no contact with the victim.

In June 2023, The Hollywood Reporter revealed that Bryan was accused of running a fraudulent agriculture-technology startup scheme. Four sources told the publication that the scheme involved them giving Bryan individual payment amounts ranging from $5,000 to $25,000 in exchange for fake contracts that actually had no value. The amount of money Bryan earned from the scheme is said to have totaled close to $50,000.

On July 28, 2023, Bryan was arrested for domestic assault again in Eugene, Oregon. Bryan had been charged with fourth degree robbery and harassment. On October 25, 2023, Bryan pleaded guilty to Felony Assault in the Fourth Degree Constituting Domestic Violence. As part of his plea deal, another count that Bryan was charged with was dismissed. Bryan was sentenced to 36 months of supervised probation, seven days in jail and was required to abide by a set of conditions typical of domestic violence cases, including no contact with his victim. Bryan was also warned that failure to comply with the probation terms would result in him serving 19–20 months in prison.

On the morning of February 17, 2024, Bryan was arrested for alleged DUI after a traffic collision in La Quinta, California. Bryan was charged with both misdemeanor contempt of court and a felony for operating a vehicle while under the influence of drugs or alcohol. This was his fourth DUI charge. He was released the same day after posting a $50,000 bail, with a court hearing also scheduled for April 3. On March 27, 2024, it was revealed that Bryan had also received an additional felony charge related to driving under the influence after having three or more DUI convictions in the last ten years.

On October 24, 2024, Bryan was arrested in Custer County, Oklahoma, for driving under the influence, his second DUI offense in the year 2024, and also for driving without a valid license. The Custer County Sheriff's Office's website shows that Bryan was booked into the jail shortly after 8:30 a.m. that morning. His Oklahoma DUI charge was described as a "driving under the influence - second felony offense." On October 27, Deadline Hollywood reported that on the day of his booking, Bryan was able to get released after posting a $65,000 bail. On October 29, 2024, additional dashcam footage obtained by Fox News was released that confirmed that Bryan was arrested after refusing to take a sobriety test, and that he also admitted to driving after a night of drinking during his arrest. In this dashcam video footage, Bryan stated that the DUI charge that resulted in his license getting suspended was issued in 2021.

On January 2, 2025, Bryan was arrested in Myrtle Beach, South Carolina, and charged with second-degree domestic violence. He was released from the J. Reuben Long Detention Center the following day. The victim was later identified as Cartwright.

On November 29, 2025, Bryan was arrested in Eugene, Oregon, for violating his probation; Cartwright was also arrested on separate charges. He was denied bail and was due for release on December 3, 2025. During his arraignment, Bryan entered a denial on the charges; as a result, he was given a hearing date for later the same month on the probation charges and was transferred on a "detainer" to Lane County Community Corrections. Bryan was released from police custody ten days later. He went on to admit to three probation violations during a court appearance on December 29, 2025. A sentence hearing in relation to the charges was set for February 17, 2026. Bryan was convicted and ultimately sentenced to serve sixteen out of the 20 months he was originally meant to serve prior to receiving his 36 months of probation in 2023. He was then held at the Larry D. Smith Correctional Facility in Banning, California. The following month, Bryan was ordered to serve an additional 19 months in Oregon, in relation to his November 2025 arrest.

== Filmography ==
Film
Year	Title	Role	Notes
1994	Bigfoot: The Unforgettable Encounter	Cody	
1995	Magic Island	Jack Carlisle	Video
1996	First Kid	Rob	
1999	True Heart	Sam	
1999	The Rage: Carrie 2	Eric	
2000	Held for Ransom	Glenn Kirkland	
2001	Rustin	Keith Gatlin	
2001	Longshot	Deke	
2004	Slammed	Derek	
2005	The Game of Their Lives	Harry Keough	
2006	Annapolis	Johnson	Uncredited
2006	The Fast and the Furious: Tokyo Drift	Clay	
2008	Trunk	Jake	Short film

Television
Year	Title	Role	Notes
1990	ABC TGIF	Brad	TV series
1990	Crash: The Mystery of Flight 1501	Child (uncredited)	TV movie
1991–1999	Home Improvement	Brad Taylor	Lead role
1994	Thunder Alley	Brad Taylor	Episode: "First Date"
1995	The Fresh Prince of Bel-Air	Steve	Episode: "There's the Rub: Part 1"; Episode: "There's the Rub: Part 2"
1996	Picket Fences		Episode: "Winner Takes All"
1997	Soul Man	Brad Taylor	Episode: "Public Embarrassment and Todd's First Sermon"
1997	Promised Land	Ryan Gerhart	Episode: "Mr. Muscles"
1998	Principal Takes a Holiday	John Scaduto	TV movie
2000	Chicken Soup for the Soul	Daniel	Episode: "The Two Sides of Love"
2000	Opposite Sex	Chuck	Episode: "The Dance Episode"; Episode: "The Field Trip Episode"
2000–2001	Boston Public	Malcolm White	Episode: "Chapter One"; Episode: "Chapter Five"; Episode: "Chapter Twenty-Two"
2001	Family Law	Jamie Wilkins	Episode: "Liar's Club: Part 1"; Episode: "Liar's Club: Part 2"
2001	Touched by an Angel	Jeff McHenry	Episode: "The Penalty Box"
2001	ER	Upsilon Psi Lambda Frat Brother	Episode: "Sailing Away"
2001	The Outer Limits	Ray	Episode: "Abduction"
2002	A Killing Spring	Val Massey	TV movie
2002	Philly	Brian Lee	Episode: "Lies of Minelli"
2002	Buffy the Vampire Slayer	Peter Nicols	Episode: "Help"
2003	Smallville	Eric Marsh	Episode: "Witness"
2004	Century City	Teddy Paikin	Episode: "Love and Games"
2004	Plainsong	Russell Beckman	TV movie
2004–2005	Center of the Universe	Kevin Barnett	Episode: "Good Parenting, Bad Parenting"; Episode: "If You Love Something Leave It Alone"; Episode: "Oh Brother, What the Hell Were You Thinking?"
2005	Veronica Mars	Caz Truman	Episode: "Ruskie Business"; Episode: "Kanes and Abel's"
2005	Code Breakers	Brian Nolan	TV movie
2006	Cold Case	Petey (1988)	Episode: "8 Years"
2006	Shark	Scott Natterson	Episode: "Déjà Vu All Over Again"
2007	K-Ville	Ricky	Episode: "Critical Mass"; Episode: "Game Night"
2008	Burn Notice	Drew	Episode: "Double Booked"
2009	Knight Rider	Terry Driscoll	Episode: "Knight and the City"
2009	Meteor	Deputy Koskey	TV miniseries
2009	THOR: Hammer of the Gods	Thor	TV movie
2022	The Guardians of Justice	The President's Aide #1	Netflix

Producer
Year	Title	Notes
2008	Trunk	Co-producer
2010	The Wine Guy Unplugged with Anthony Gilardi	Associate producer
2010	Prowl	
2012	Rogue River	
2012	The Grief Tourist	

== Awards ==
=== Wins ===
- 1994 – Young Artist Awards for Outstanding Youth Ensemble in a Television Series (Home Improvement) **Shared with Taran Noah Smith and Jonathan Taylor Thomas**
- 1999 – Young Artist Awards for Best Performance in a TV Drama or Comedy Series – Leading Young Actor (Home Improvement)
- 1999 – YoungStar Awards for Best Performance by a Young Actor in a Comedy TV Series (Home Improvement)

=== Nominations ===
- 1993 – Young Artist Awards for Best Young Actor Starring in a Television Series (Home Improvement)
- 1998 – YoungStar Awards for Best Performance by a Young Actor in a Miniseries/Made-for-TV Movie (Principal Takes a Holiday)
