= Play Dirty (novel) =

2007 novel by Sandra Brown

- Author: Sandra Brown
- Language: English
- Genre: Action, Thriller, Romance
- Publisher: The New York Times (USA)
- Publication date: 2007
- Publication place: United States

Play Dirty is a thriller novel written by Sandra Brown in 2007. According to WorldCat, the book was held in more than 2,500 libraries as of February 2014.

== Plot ==
The book tells the story of Griff Burkett, a football fallen star, who was caught cheating and was sent to prison. After five years, Burkett is a free man. He meets Foster and Laura Speakman, a wealthy and successful but childless couple. They hire Burkett to do a secret job, but then is suspected of an unsolved murder by his long-time nemesis, detective Stanley Rodarte. Burkett tries to prove his innocence and save the people they care about the most. The narrative contains a lot of sexual content. The book was published by Ricochet in 2006 and later by Simon & Schuster.

== Characters ==
- Griff Burkett is a convicted former football player who has just got out of prison. He has been sent to prison after he was caught cheating. He is the male protagonist.
- Foster Speakman is a very successful and wealthy businessman. He is the owner of SunSouth Airline company.
- Laura Speakman is Foster Speakman's wife and the female protagonist.
- Stanley Rodarte is a corrupted police detective. He is Burkett's nemesis.

== Reception ==
Reviews of the book vary from "solid thriller" (Kirkus) to "disappointing" (Washburn Review)
