= Lee Horsley =

American actor (born 1955)

- Born: Lee Arthur Horsley; May 15, 1955 (age 71); Muleshoe, Texas, U.S.
- Occupation: Actor
- Years active: 1981–2015
- Spouse: Stephanie Downer (m. 1980)
- Children: 2

Lee Arthur Horsley (born May 15, 1955) is an American retired film, television, and theater actor known for starring roles in the television series Nero Wolfe (1981), Matt Houston (1982–1985), and Paradise (1988–1991). He starred in the 1982 film The Sword and the Sorcerer and recorded the audiobook edition of Lonesome Dove.

== Career ==
Horsley began his acting career touring in stage productions of West Side Story, Damn Yankees, and Oklahoma!. In 1981, he portrayed TV detective Archie Goodwin in the short-lived NBC drama series Nero Wolfe. He played the title character in the 1982–1985 ABC detective series Matt Houston, and starred as Ethan Allen Cord in the 1988–1991 Western Heritage Award-winning series Paradise. This was followed by a lead role on the CBS police drama Bodies of Evidence (1992–1993). He also starred opposite Lynda Carter in a series set in the French and Indian War era, Hawkeye. Horsley also starred as Rafe Beaudeen in North and South: Book II and as Nick Burnham in the Danielle Steel miniseries, Crossings opposite Jane Seymour and Christopher Plummer.

He appeared in the feature-length cult film The Sword and the Sorcerer in 1982, and he appeared in its sequel Tales of an Ancient Empire in 2010. He recorded the audiobook edition of Larry McMurtry's Lonesome Dove and Chuck Norris's Justice Riders. In 2006, Horsley and Marshall R. Teague traveled the world in search of exotic game on the Outdoor Life Network for the reality show, Benelli's Dream Hunts. Horsley appeared in the 2012 Quentin Tarantino film Django Unchained as Sheriff Gus and then in Tarantino's 2015 western The Hateful Eight as a stagecoach driver.

In the 1987–1988 theatre season, Horsley acted in the Jerry Herman musical, Mack and Mabel, at the Paper Mill Playhouse in Millburn, New Jersey with Janet Metz, Scott Ellis, Ed Evanko, and Ruth Williamson in the cast. Robert Johanson was director.

== Personal life ==
Horsley was born in Muleshoe, Texas, the seat of Bailey County. He grew up in the Denver, Colorado area, sang in a church choir and graduated from Englewood High School in 1973. Horsley married Stephanie Downer in 1980 and fathered a daughter, Amber, in 1981 and a son, Logan, in 1983. Horsley is an outdoorsman, horseman, rodeo participant, and western novelist.

== Filmography ==
Film
Year	Title	Role	Notes
1982	The Sword and the Sorcerer	Prince Talon	Nominated - Saturn Award for Best Actor
1994	Unlawful Passage	Peter Browning	
1999	Nightmare Man	Ed Cody	
2003	Dismembered	Joe Kenny	
2005	Jasper: The Story of a Mule	Narrator	Voice role
2007	Showdown at Area 51	Diamond Joe Carson	
2009	Crossing Over	Ray Cooper	Scenes Deleted
2010	Tales of an Ancient Empire	Talon	Sequel to The Sword and the Sorcerer
2012	Django Unchained	Sheriff Gus	
2015	The Hateful Eight	Ed	

== Television ==
Television
Year	Title	Role	Notes
1981	Nero Wolfe	Archie Goodwin	14 episodes
1982	The Wild Women of Chastity Gulch	Captain John Cain	TV movie
1983	The Love Boat	Greg Munford	Episode: "China Cruise"
1985	Thirteen at Dinner	Bryan Martin	TV movie
1985	When Dreams Come True	Alex Kazloff	TV movie
1982–85	Matt Houston	Matlock 'Matt' Houston	67 episodes
1986	North and South, Book II	Rafe Beaudeen	Miniseries
1986	Crossings	Nick Burnham	Miniseries
1987	Infidelity	Nick Denato	TV movie
1988	Dolly	Jim Miller	Season 1, episode 15
1989	Single Women Married Men	Ross Marino	TV movie
1990	The Face of Fear	Graham Harris	TV movie
1991	Palomino	Tate Jordan	TV movie
1988–91	Paradise	Ethan Allen Cord	Western Heritage Award (won)
1992–93	Bodies of Evidence	Lt. Ben Carroll	16 episodes
1994	The Corpse Had a Familiar Face	Ben Nicholson	TV movie
1994	French Silk	Detective Cassidy	TV movie
1994–95	Hawkeye	Natty 'Hawkeye' Bumppo	22 episodes
1995	Snowy River: The McGregor Saga	Seamus O'Neil	Episodes: "Rough Passage", "The Prodigal Father (1)" and "The Prodigal Father (2)"
1996	The Care and Handling of Roses	Tom Doster	TV movie
1996	Home Song	Tom Gardner	TV movie
1998	Wind on Water	Gardner Poole	
2001	Touched by an Angel	Guy Garfield	Episode: "I Am an Angel"
2019	The Hateful Eight: Extended Version	Ed	Miniseries
