= Susan Lucci =

American actress (born 1946)

- Lucci in 2026
- Born: Susan Victoria Lucci; December 23, 1946 (age 79); Scarsdale, New York, U.S.
- Education: Marymount College, Tarrytown (BA)
- Occupations: Actress; television personality
- Years active: 1969–present
- Spouse: Helmut Huber (m. 1969; died 2022)
- Children: 2, including Liza Huber
- Website: susanlucci.com

Susan Victoria Lucci (born December 23, 1946) is an American actress. She is best known for portraying Erica Kane on the ABC daytime drama All My Children during that show's entire network run from 1970 to 2011. The character is considered an icon, and she was called "Daytime's Leading Lady" by TV Guide, with The New York Times and the Los Angeles Times citing her as the highest-paid actor in daytime television. As early as 1991, her salary had been reported as over $1 million a year. During her run on All My Children, Lucci was nominated 21 times for the Daytime Emmy Award for Outstanding Lead Actress in a Drama Series. She won only once, in 1999, after the 19th nomination; her status as a perpetual nominee for the award had attracted significant media attention since the late 1980s.

Lucci has also acted in other TV series, as well as occasionally in film and on stage. She had multi-episode guest appearances on the series Dallas, Hot in Cleveland and Army Wives. Lucci hosted Saturday Night Live in 1990. After the cancellation of All My Children, she hosted the 2012–2014 true crime series Deadly Affairs and starred (as Genevieve Delatour) in the 2013–2016 Lifetime series Devious Maids.

In 1996, TV Guide ranked her number 37 on its 50 Greatest TV Stars of All Time list. She was named one of VH1's 200 Top Icons of All Time and one of Barbara Walters's Ten Most Fascinating People.

== Early life ==
Susan Lucci was born in Scarsdale, New York, to parents Jeanette (1917–2021) and Victor Lucci (1919–2002). Her father was of Italian ancestry, and her mother was of Swedish descent. She lived in Yonkers, New York, before moving with her family at age 2 to Elmont, New York, and then at age 5 to another Long Island town, Garden City, New York. Lucci graduated from Garden City High School in 1964 and from Marymount College, Tarrytown in 1968, with a BA degree in drama.

== Career ==
Susan Lucci began her television career with bit parts on the daytime soap operas Love Is a Many Splendored Thing and The Doctors. She also appeared in an uncredited role in the 1969 film Goodbye, Columbus and had a minor role in the 1969 comedy-drama Me, Natalie.

=== All My Children ===
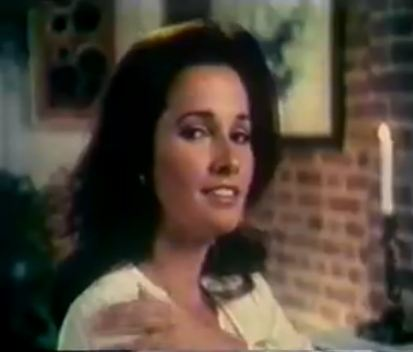
Susan Lucci featured in a Riunite commercial in 1977.

Lucci is best known for appearing as Erica Kane on the ABC soap opera All My Children, from January 16, 1970, to September 23, 2011. Erica is considered to be the most popular character in American soap opera history. TV Guide calls her "unequivocally the most famous soap opera character in the history of daytime TV," and included her in their 2013 list of The 60 Nastiest Villains of All Time.

Lucci was nominated for the Outstanding Lead Actress in a Drama Series Emmy for her work on All My Children almost every year beginning in 1978. When Lucci did not win the award after several consecutive nominations, her image in the media began to be lampooned, as she became notoriously synonymous with never winning an Emmy. NBC's Saturday Night Live exploited this by asking her to host an episode; during her monologue, the show's cast, crew, and even stagehands nonchalantly carried (and utilized; for example, as hammers and doorjambs) Emmys of their own in her presence. In addition, she appeared in a 1989 television commercial for the sugar substitute Sweet One, intended to portray her as the opposite of her villainess character, yet throwing one of Erica Kane's characteristic tantrums, shouting, "Eleven years without an Emmy! What does a person have to do around here to get an Emmy?" Her name eventually became part of the language, used as an avatar for artists who receive numerous award nominations without a win (e.g., "Peter O'Toole was the Susan Lucci of the Oscars.").

After 18 nominations, she finally won in 1999; Lucci received a standing ovation upon receiving the award, which was presented by Shemar Moore.

When ABC cancelled All My Children on April 14, 2011, after 41 years on the air, Lucci said in an interview: "It's been a fantastic journey. I've loved playing Erica Kane and working with Agnes Nixon and all the incredible people involved with All My Children. I'm looking forward to all kinds of new and exciting opportunities." Lucci publicly criticized ABC Daytime president Brian Frons over the cancellation of All My Children in the epilogue of her autobiography All My Life.

=== Primetime television, stage, hosting and film ===
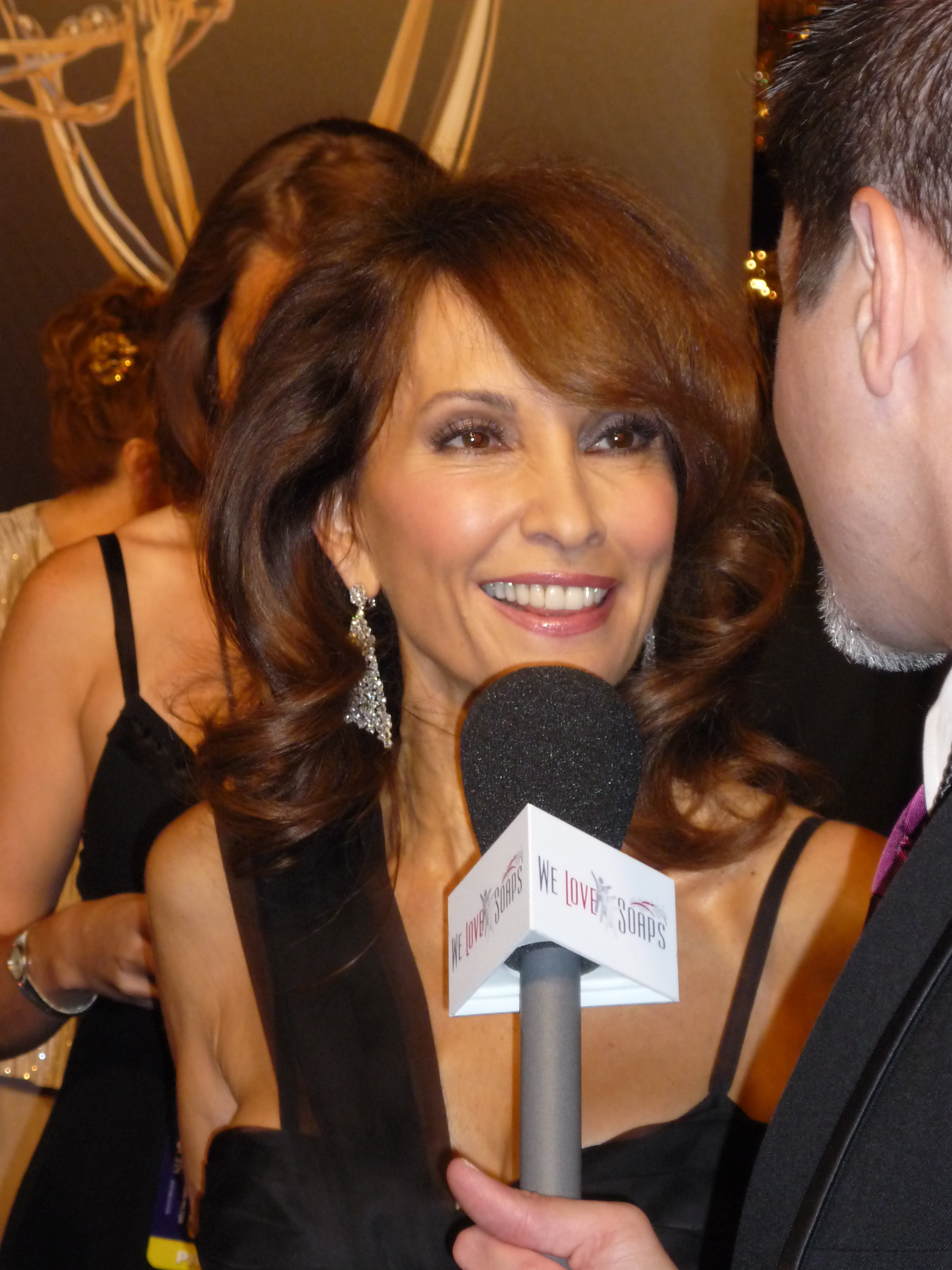
Lucci at the 2010 Daytime Emmy Awards

Lucci has appeared in a number of television series and television movies. In 1982, she appeared in a cameo appearance in the comedy film Young Doctors in Love. During the 1980s, she made guest-starring appearances in prime time series, such as The Love Boat, Fantasy Island and The Fall Guy. In 1984 she played her first leading role in the supernatural horror film Invitation to Hell directed by Wes Craven.

In 1986, Lucci played the role of Darya Romanoff in the Golden Globe– and Emmy Award–winning made-for-television movie Anastasia: The Mystery of Anna. The same year she played the lead role as Antoinette Giancana, Salavatore 'Sam' Giancana's daughter's in the crime made-for-television movie, Mafia Princess. The following year she starred in another horror film, Haunted by Her Past. She later starred in the crime dramas Lady Mobster (1988) and The Bride in Black (1990). In 1990–1991, she began a series of guest spots on the nighttime soap opera Dallas. She hosted NBC's Saturday Night Live in October of that year; in one skit, she appeared as Erica Kane competing on a game show. In 1991 she starred in the thriller The Woman Who Sinned. She later starred in Double Edge (1992), Between Love and Hate (1993), French Silk (1994) and Seduced and Betrayed (1995).

In 1995, Lucci played Elizabeth 'Ebbie' Scrooge in the Lifetime Fantasy television film, Ebbie. This film was an updated version of A Christmas Carol. Lucci played a Scrooge-like department store owner visited by Marley and the three ghosts on Christmas.Television critic Lynne Heffley from Los Angeles Times gave it a positive review writing: "Soap queen Susan Lucci of "All My Children" is fun to watch as a severely tailored, unsmiling boss, spreading misery wherever she goes on Christmas Eve, whether firing a security guard or deciding the store's traditional window display has got to go." In 1998 she returned to thrillers with Blood on Her Hands.

In 1999, she played the title role of Annie Oakley in the revival of Irving Berlin's musical Annie Get Your Gun. Michael Logan of TV Guide said, "Susan Lucci didn't just take Great White Way by storm: she took it by tornado, hurricane and tsunami, too." In 2004, she guest starred in two episodes of the ABC comedy series Hope & Faith opposite Kelly Ripa. In 2005 she guest-starred on That's So Raven.

Lucci competed in season 7 of Dancing with the Stars with dance partner Tony Dovolani. She said that Dancing had asked her to appear before, but she had turned it down, in part, because of the travel it would have required of her (at the time Dancing taped in Los Angeles while All My Children taped in New York). Lucci later changed her mind, in part, because of the experience of fellow All My Children star Cameron Mathison, who finished fifth in season 5. She was voted off the show on November 5, 2008, rather than November 4 due to election night, finishing sixth in the competition.

=== 2012–present ===
From 2010 to 2014, Lucci made several appearances as herself, the arch rival of Wendie Malick's character, Victoria Chase, on the TV Land sitcom Hot in Cleveland, including the February 1, 2012 episode entitled "Life with Lucci". She appeared in Gloria Estefan's music video "Hotel Nacional" in February 2012. She guest starred in multi-episodes of the sixth season of Lifetime drama series, Army Wives in 2012. Lucci also hosted and narrated Deadly Affairs, a prime-time series airing on Investigation Discovery from 2012 to 2014. On November 15, 2012, Lucci appeared on The Colbert Report in a segment reflecting the soap-opera-like nature of the Petraeus scandal.

In 2013, Lucci began starring as Geneviève Delatour in the Lifetime comedy-drama series, Devious Maids created by Marc Cherry. Her comedic performance was well received by television critics. The series ended in 2016 after four seasons. In 2015 she appeared in the comedy-drama film, Joy directed by David O. Russell.

In 2017, Lucci played one of Kristen Bell and Dax Shepard's grandparents (with Henry Winkler) in Sia's music video, "Santa's Coming for Us". Also in 2017 she guest-starred in an episode of Hulu comedy series, Difficult People. She also appeared in television ads for Progressive Insurance that were styled as a soap opera.

In 2023, Lucci received Lifetime Achievement Award at the 50th Daytime Emmy Awards. In 2024, after seven years acting hiatus, Lucci returned to screen in the black comedy film, Outcome starring opposite Keanu Reeves, Jonah Hill and Cameron Diaz.

== Personal life ==
Lucci married Austrian-born chef and food-service manager Helmut Huber on September 13, 1969. They are the parents of two children: actress Liza Huber and a son, Andreas Huber. The couple were married 52 years until Helmut's death on March 28, 2022; he was 84 years old.

Lucci's autobiography, All My Life: A Memoir, was published in 2011. She is a registered Republican and has hosted fundraising events for Rudy Giuliani. She is a supporter of LGBT rights and equality, her support spurred by an All My Children storyline in 2000 in which her character Erica's daughter, Bianca Montgomery, came out as a lesbian.

In late 2018, Lucci had an emergency procedure to place two arterial stents in her heart after blocked arteries were discovered due to chest pain. Lucci postponed making her experience public until shortly before the American Heart Association's annual Go Red for Women fashion event in February 2019.

=== Business ventures ===
Lucci also has her own line of hair care products, perfumes, lingerie, and skin care, called The Susan Lucci Collection.

== Filmography ==
Year	Title	Role	Notes
1969	Goodbye, Columbus	Wedding Guest	Uncredited
1969	Love Is a Many Splendored Thing	Bit role	Uncredited
1969	Me, Natalie	Cheerleader	
1969	The Doctors	Outpatient Day Player	Uncredited
1970–2011	All My Children	Erica Kane; Jane Campbell	Lead role
1982	The Love Boat	Paula Hastings	Episode: "The Groupies/The Audition/Doc's Nephew"
1982	Young Doctors in Love	Herself	
1983	Fantasy Island	Gina Edwards	Episode: "The Songwriter/Queen of the Soaps"
1984	Invitation to Hell	Jessica Jones	
1984	The Fall Guy	Veronica Remy	Episode: "Stranger Than Fiction"
1986	Mafia Princess	Antoinette Giancana	
1986	Anastasia: The Mystery of Anna	Darya Romanoff	
1987	Haunted by Her Past or Secret Passions	Karen Beckett	
1988	Lady Mobster	Laurel Castle	
1990	The Bride in Black	Rose D'Amore-Malloy	
1990	Saturday Night Live	Herself – Host/Various	Episode: "Susan Lucci/Hothouse Flowers"
1990–1991	Dallas	Hillary Taylor/Faux Sheila Foley	Special guest star, 6 episodes
1991	The Woman Who Sinned	Victoria Robeson	
1992	Double Edge	Maggie Dutton/Carmen Moore	
1993	Between Love and Hate	Vivian Conrad	
1994	French Silk	Claire Laurent	
1995	Ebbie	Elizabeth 'Ebbie' Scrooge	
1995	Seduced and Betrayed	Victoria Landers	
1998	Blood on Her Hands	Isabelle Collins	
2002	Between the Lions	Herself	2 episodes
2004	Hope & Faith	Jacqueline Karr	Episodes: "Daytime Emmys: Part 1" and "Daytime Emmys: Part 2"
2005	That's So Raven	Miss Charlotte Romano	Episode: "The Big Buzz"
2010–2014	Hot in Cleveland	Susan Lucci	Special guest star, 5 episodes
2012	Army Wives	Audrey Whitaker	3 episodes
2012–2014	Deadly Affairs	Herself – Host	Documentary series
2013–2016	Devious Maids	Genevieve Delatour	Series regular
2015	Joy	Danica	
2017	Difficult People	Shelley Waxman	Episode: "Cindarestylox"
2018	Ralph Breaks the Internet	(voice)	
2023	Generation Gap	Herself	Episode: "What Kid Doesn't Love Stew?"
2025	Hell's Kitchen	Herself	Guest diner / American Heart Association contributor; Episode: "A Soap Opera in Hell"
2026	Outcome	Dinah Hawk	

== Awards and nominations ==
Daytime Emmy Awards
Year	Category	Work	Result	Ref
1978	Outstanding Lead Actress in a Drama Series	All My Children	Nominated	
1981	Outstanding Lead Actress in a Drama Series	All My Children	Nominated	
1982	Outstanding Lead Actress in a Drama Series	All My Children	Nominated	
1983	Outstanding Lead Actress in a Drama Series	All My Children	Nominated	
1984	Outstanding Lead Actress in a Drama Series	All My Children	Nominated	
1985	Outstanding Lead Actress in a Drama Series	All My Children	Nominated	
1986	Outstanding Lead Actress in a Drama Series	All My Children	Nominated	
1987	Outstanding Lead Actress in a Drama Series	All My Children	Nominated	
1988	Outstanding Lead Actress in a Drama Series	All My Children	Nominated	
1989	Outstanding Lead Actress in a Drama Series	All My Children	Nominated	
1990	Outstanding Lead Actress in a Drama Series	All My Children	Nominated	
1991	Outstanding Lead Actress in a Drama Series	All My Children	Nominated	
1992	Outstanding Lead Actress in a Drama Series	All My Children	Nominated	
1993	Outstanding Lead Actress in a Drama Series	All My Children	Nominated	
1995	Outstanding Lead Actress in a Drama Series	All My Children	Nominated	
1996	Outstanding Lead Actress in a Drama Series	All My Children	Nominated	
1997	Outstanding Lead Actress in a Drama Series	All My Children	Nominated	
1998	Outstanding Lead Actress in a Drama Series	All My Children	Nominated	
1999	Outstanding Lead Actress in a Drama Series	All My Children	Won	
2001	Outstanding Lead Actress in a Drama Series	All My Children	Nominated	
2002	Outstanding Lead Actress in a Drama Series	All My Children	Nominated	
2023	Lifetime Achievement Award	Herself	Honored	

Soap Opera Digest Awards
Year	Category	Work	Result	Ref
1986	Outstanding Contribution by an Actor/Actress to the Form of Continuing Drama who is currently on a Daytime Serial	All My Children	Nominated	
1988	Editor's Choice – Daytime	All My Children	Won	
1989	Favorite Super Couple: Daytime (shared with Larkin Malloy)	All My Children	Nominated	
1992	Best Love Story: Daytime or Prime Time (shared with Walt Willey)	All My Children	Nominated	
1993	Outstanding Lead Actress	All My Children	Won	
2003	Soapnet Diamond Award	All My Children	Won	
2005	Favorite Couple (shared with Walt Willey)	All My Children	Nominated	

Other awards and honors include:

- Golden Plate Award of the American Academy of Achievement presented by Awards Council member Henry Kravis, 1991
- Favorite Female Performer in a Daytime Serial, People's Choice Awards, 1992
- Women in Film Lucy Award, 1994
- New York Women in Film & Television Muse Award, 2004
- Outstanding Female Lead in a Daytime Drama, Gracie Allen Awards, 2005
- Hollywood Walk of Fame, 2005
- NAB Broadcasting Hall of Fame, 2006
- Ride of Fame inductee, 2013
- Disney Legend, 2015
- in 2002 Susan Lucci appears Atlantic City October 25 with Regis philbin
