= List of 9 to 5 episodes =

9 to 5 is an American sitcom based on the 1980 film of the same name, that aired originally aired on ABC and later in syndication. 9 to 5 features Rachel Dennison, Dolly Parton's younger sister, in Parton's role of Doralee Rhodes; Rita Moreno portrayed the Lily Tomlin role of Violet Newstead, and Valerie Curtin took the Jane Fonda role of Judy Bernly. In the truncated third season, Curtin's Judy Bernly was replaced with Leah Ayres as secretary Linda Bowman. In the second version of the show, Sally Struthers replaced Moreno, and Curtin returned as Judy. 9 to 5 premiered on March 25, 1982, and ended on March 26, 1988, with a total of 85 episodes over the course of 5 seasons. The season 3 episodes "Dog Day Afternoon" and "Pillow Talk" never aired.

== Series overview ==
Season	Episodes	Originally released			Nielsen Rank	Nielsen Rating
Season	Episodes	First released	Last released	Network	Nielsen Rank	Nielsen Rating
1	4	March 25, 1982	April 15, 1982	ABC	33	TBA
2	22	September 28, 1982	May 10, 1983	ABC	15	19.3 (Note: Tied with The Mississippi)
3	7	September 29, 1983	October 27, 1983	ABC	84	11.4
4	26	September 13, 1986	March 28, 1987	Syndication	TBA	TBA
5	26	September 13, 1987	March 26, 1988	Syndication	TBA	TBA

== Episodes ==
=== Season 1 (1982) ===
No. overall	No. in season	Title	Directed by	Written by	Original release date	Prod. code
1	1	"New Kid on the Block"	Noam Pitlik	Kim Weiskopf, Michael S. Baser	March 25, 1982	1U01
Violet and Judy suspect a new secretary has been hired for her physical attributes.
2	2	"Herassment"	Noam Pitlik	Larry Balmagia	April 1, 1982	1U03
An image change for Judy works too well and attracts the amorous Mr. Hart.
3	3	"The China Sin-Drome"	Nell Cox	Debra Frank, Scott Rubenstein	April 8, 1982	1U02
Hart's chance to land a big contract in Taiwan hinges on whether Doralee is willing to go along as part of the package. The title is a pun on the 1979 Jane Fonda film The China Syndrome.
4	4	"Tinker, Tailor, Soldier, Secretary"	Hy Averback	Larry Balmagia	April 15, 1982	1U04
Violet risks her job when she refuses to take a polygraph test ordered by Hart.

=== Season 2 (1982–83) ===
No. overall	No. in season	Title	Directed by	Written by	Original release date	Prod. code
5	1	"The Loverwear Party"	Michael Zinberg	Wendy Kout, Michele Willens	September 28, 1982	2C01
Violet decides to supplement her income by selling erotic apparel but Roz mistakes the coffeeroom sales conferences for union organizing. * Marian Mercer also appeared in the movie version as Missy Hart.
6	2	"The Security Guard"	Michael Zinberg	Dale McRaven	October 12, 1982	2C02
Jane Fonda (who portrayed Judy in the movie) plays a cynical security guard who learns about "pink collar" life from stories the secretaries tell.
7	3	"Real Men Don't Make Quiche"	Michael Zinberg	Story by : Ron Bloomberg; Story and teleplay by : Jeffrey Ferro, Fredric Weiss	October 19, 1982	2C04
Judy mistakes the computer's power switch for the light switch, wipes out the office data, and loses her job.
8	4	"Dick Doesn't Live Here Anymore"	Michael Zinberg	Susan Seeger	October 26, 1982	2C03
Judy lets her estranged husband (John Larroquette) and his girlfriend stay at her place.
9	5	"Home is Where the Hart is"	Michael Zinberg	Jeffrey Ferro, Fredric Weiss	November 9, 1982	2C07
Doralee's boyfriend (Howard Hessman) comes up from Tennessee for a visit—and won't go home without her.
10	6	"Don't Take My Wife, Please (aka An Affair to Forget)"	Michael Lessac	Garry Ferrier, Aubrey Tadman	November 16, 1982	2C09
It seems that Mr. Hart has been neglecting his wife; Roz sees her at dinner with another man.
11	7	"The Party's Over (aka Time to Panic)"	Michael Lessac	Story by : Ron Bloomberg; Teleplay by : Jeffrey Ferro, Fredric Weiss	November 23, 1982	2C06
If the mail clerk's rumor is true, company budget cuts call for the firing of one employee, and everyone thinks they'll be the unlucky one.
12	8	"Temporarily Disconnected"	Michael Lessac	Teleplay by : Wendy Kout; Story and teleplay by : Maxine Herman	November 30, 1982	2C10
A chance meeting with her former in-laws leads Violet to drop her new beau like a hot potato.
13	9	"Hard Sell"	Michael Zinberg	Ron Bloomberg	December 7, 1982	2C05
Harry quits the company, but Violet can't join the others in urging him to stay—she's next in line for his job.
14	10	"Power Failure"	Peter Bonerz	Fredric Weiss	December 14, 1982	2C11
Felled by back spasms, Hart tells Roz to "hold down the fort" and she does—like a drill sergeant.
15	11	"Did it Happen One Night?"	Michael Zinberg	Susan Seeger	January 4, 1983	2C13
A power blackout in snowbound Cleveland gives rise to some unusual survival tactics like Hart building a fire in his office.
16	12	"Torn Between One Lover"	Michael Zinberg	Jeffrey Ferro, Wendy Kout	January 11, 1983	2C14
Judy invites her new racquetball partner to the apartment, unaware he's also the psychology professor Doralee is smitten with.
17	13	"Hex Marks the Spot"	Peter Baldwin	Gary H. Miller	January 18, 1983	2C15
Doralee claims that the company's new toothpaste logo is the same symbol her grandmother told her was a bad luck sign.
18	14	"Three for the Money"	Burt Brinckerhoff	Jeffrey Ferro, Fredric Weiss	February 1, 1983	2C16
The secretaries each add their own personal ingredients to their food-processor demonstration as they audition for a new job.
19	15	"The Oldest Profession"	Peter Baldwin	Fredi Towbin	February 15, 1983	2C18
The secretaries do moonlighting work delivering singing telegrams. Their costumes give a vice cop the wrong idea and the girls are arrested for prostitution.
20	16	"When Violet Gets Blue"	Burt Brinckerhoff	Marty Farrell	February 22, 1983	2C20
Violet is offered a big promotion—after a night of romance with a visiting executive.
21	17	"Big Bucks"	Burt Brinckerhoff	Ron Bloomberg	March 1, 1983	2C19
Judy learns she's being paid more than her friends and tells Mr. Hart—hoping he'll raise their salaries.
22	18	"I Want to Dance"	Peter Baldwin	Wendy Kout	March 15, 1983	2C21
Violet is acting strange: waltzing in the office, sneaking into the executive steamroom, and refusing Hart's demand that she reschedule her trip to New York.
23	19	"Movin' On"	Michael Lessac	Gary H. Miller	March 22, 1983	2C23
Violet has 24 hours to raise $100,000 or the bank will foreclose on her house.
24	20	"Eight Hours"	Peter Baldwin	Jeffrey Ferro, Fredric Weiss	April 12, 1983	2C22
With their company formal just eight hours away, the secretaries rush to reproduce the reports that Hart mistakenly shredded.
25	21	"Off Broadway"	Michael Lessac	Ron Bloomberg	May 3, 1983	2C12
Judy suggests that the company's products show feature live performers—the employees.
26	22	"The Phantom"	Peter Baldwin	Ron Friedman	May 10, 1983	2C17
Items missing from the office suggest that a thief has been at work, so Hart teaches the women self-defense.

=== Season 3 (1983) ===
No. overall	No. in season	Title	Written by	Original release date	Prod. code
27	1	"'Till Tomorrow Do Us Part"	Al Jean, Michael Reiss	September 29, 1983	1S05
Hart asks Violet to pose as his wife at a college reunion.
28	2	"The Frog Inside Prince Charming"	George Bloom	October 6, 1983	1S02
New salesman Michael charms the secretaries, but only Violet finds the nerve to ask him out.
29	3	"Mid-Wife Crisis"	Diane Wilk	October 13, 1983	1S01
Hart is an emotional wreck after learning his wife wants a divorce, so he seeks comfort at the secretaries' apartment.
30	4	"Eleven-Year Itch"	Stan Cutler	October 20, 1983	1S03
Doralee advises 11-year-old Tommy how to kiss a girl, then innocently leaves the boy alone with Linda in the apartment.
31	5	"Family Business"	Dave Hackel	October 27, 1983	1S07
Hart hopes a new contract results from Linda's meeting with her father, an Army purchasing agent, but Linda just wants a quiet evening with her dad.
32	6	"Dag Day Afternoon"	George Bloom	November 3, 1983	1S04
Ornery Dag Lawson intends to close the factory and fire everyone.
33	7	"Pillow Talk"	Susan Sebastian, Diane Ayers	November 10, 1983	1S06
The threat of competition from another firm has Hart wining and dining his rivals---and spilling a few of his own company secrets as well.

=== Season 4 (1986–87) ===
No. overall	No. in season	Title	Directed by	Written by	Original release date	Prod. code
34	1	"Reach Out and Touch Someone"	John Robins	Michael Kagan & Ava Nelson	September 13, 1986	4V01
Marsha is stumped by the new phone system, which stumps everyone when it goes kaput.
35	2	"You Don't Know Me"	John Robins	Michael Kagan	September 20, 1986	4V04
Marsha receives flowers and gifts from a secret admirer.
36	3	"A Date with Judy"	Tom Trbovich	Jack Carrerow & Lisa A. Bannick	September 27, 1986	4V05
Marsha has second thoughts after suggesting that Judy go on a date with Marsha's ex-husband---particularly when the date goes well.
37	4	"Even Super Women Gets the Blues"	Tom Trbovich	Story by : Paul K. Taylor; Teleplay by : Michael Kagan	October 4, 1986	4V06
Sharman is voted a "Superwoman of the '80s" by a magazine, but Marsha is interviewed by the reporter when Sharman is tied up with a project.
38	5	"Uh, About Last Night"	Unknown	Martin Sage & Sybil Adelman	October 11, 1986	4V03
Marsha's meeting with her estranged husband leads to a meeting of more than minds---and second thoughts about the divorce.
39	6	"The Party"	Tom Trbovich	David Silverman & Stephen Sustarsic	October 18, 1986	4V08
The staff brings a variety of dates and non-dates to the company's anniversary party.
40	7	"An American Dream"	Unknown	Jeanne Baruch & Jeanne Romano	October 25, 1986	4V10
The ladies tutor Morgan for his American citizenship test, while Russ gets an offer from another company.
41	8	"The Acid Test"	Tom Trbovich	Steve Kreinberg & Andrew Guerdat	November 1, 1986	4V07
Judy refuses to comply with the company's drug-testing program; Bud takes up knitting to relieve stress.
42	9	"The Naked City"	Doug Rogers	Story by : Norm Chandler Fox; Teleplay by : Jack Carrerow & Lisa A. Bannick	November 8, 1986	4V09
Sharman takes a self-defense class after being mugged---and is subsequently charged herself with assault and battery.
43	10	"What's Up, Curtis?"	Doug Rogers	Steve Kreinberg & Andy Guerdat	November 15, 1986	4V11
Doralee fears her husband's disinterest in romance means her marriage is over; Russ prepares for a trip to Central America.
44	11	"The Russians Are Coming"	Doug Rogers	Leonard Mlodinow & Scott Rubenstein	November 22, 1986	4V12
A Soviet representative finds that business and pleasure mix, as long as both are done with Sharman.
45	12	"The Ghostwriter"	John Robins	Andrew Guerdat & Steve Kreinberg	December 6, 1986	4V02
Judy is upset when Russ gets the credit for speeches she has written.
46	13	"Blue Christmas"	Doug Rogers	Jack Carrerow	December 13, 1986	4V15
A blue Christmas may be in store since Marsha's kids are away, Doralee's husband is working and Judy is alone.
47	14	"Sharman Cunningham, Vice President"	Unknown	Deborah K. Scott	January 3, 1987	4V13
Sharman is considered for a vice-presidency in the company, but would her departure also mean Marsha's?
48	15	"Judy's Dream"	Unknown	Duncan Scott McGibbon	January 10, 1987	4V14
Judy seizes the opportunity when Bud is dateless for an art show.
49	16	"Bud Knows Best"	Doug Rogers	Andrew Guerdat & Steve Kreinberg	January 17, 1987	4V17
A peculiar closeness evolves when Bud gives Marsha help with financial planning.
50	17	"Make Room for Corky"	Doug Rogers	Michael Kagan	January 24, 1987	4V18
Everyone manages to have difficulty adjusting to the new office manager, a quirky fellow named Corky (Gailard Sartain).
51	18	"Move Over Millie Maple"	Doug Rogers	Jeanne Baruch & Jeanne Romano	January 31, 1987	4V16
Marsha mounts a campaign to stop the ouster of Barkley Foods' trademark.
52	19	"Bud's Mid-Life Crisis"	Gary Shimokawa	Martin Sage & Sybil Adelman	February 7, 1987	4V20
Bud worries that life is passing him by, while Doralee worries about collecting a debt from Marsha.
53	20	"She Gives Good Phone"	Doug Rogers	Joelyn Grippo	February 14, 1987	4V21
Russ is elated at the prospect of meeting the woman he's grown to love over the phone.
54	21	"You're Dating My Baby"	Doug Rogers	Lisa A. Bannick	February 21, 1987	4V22
Judy's new relationship is complicated by the fact that the man is somewhat younger than herself.
55	22	"The Interns"	Doug Rogers	Steve Kreinberg & Andrew Guerdat	February 28, 1987	4V23
Two college interns make definite---and unfavorable---impressions.
56	23	"From Here to Kingdom Come"	Doug Rogers	Jeffrey Sachs	March 7, 1987	4V24
Judy counsels a newly fired employee, who takes to heart her advice to become more aggressive.
57	24	"Look But Don't Touch"	Gary Shimokawa	Jack Carrerow	March 14, 1987	4V25
Doralee's assignment working for Bud's boss turns into a touchy situation.
58	25	"The Big Game"	Gary Shimokawa	Story by : Martin Sage & Sybil Adelman; Teleplay by : Michael Kagan	March 21, 1987	4V26
Judy and Russ beg coach Bud for positions on the company softball team before a big game with a business rival.
59	26	"Love and Death"	Gary Shimokawa	Michael Kagan	March 28, 1987	4V19
Marsha's first date in 16 years ends abruptly.

=== Season 5 (1987–88) ===
No. overall	No. in season	Title	Directed by	Written by	Original release date	Prod. code
60	1	"Meet Mr. Felb"	Unknown	Unknown	September 12, 1987	4X28
Marsha fears for her job when the firm hires a new vice president, a man who has no scruples---but does have an eye for the ladies.
61	2	"Barkley's Beauties"	Unknown	Unknown	September 19, 1987	4X30
When Barkley Foods decides to have a contest to select a company spokesperson, Judy is chosen as the department's entrant---but her confidence drops when she sees another section's candidate.
62	3	"We're Gonna Be Rich"	Unknown	Unknown	September 26, 1987	4X27
A broke Marsha rises to the challenge of making some extra dough: she tries to market a recipe for corn fritters.
63	4	"Love is Having to Say You're Sorry"	Unknown	Unknown	October 3, 1987	4X29
Judy's work and friendships suffer when her new boyfriend takes top priority in her life.
64	5	"Doralee Buys the Farm"	Unknown	Unknown	October 10, 1987	4X32
When Doralee and her husband buy a farm, Doralee discovers she has a tough row to hoe when her farm chores cause her office work to suffer.
65	6	"Starting Over"	Unknown	Unknown	October 17, 1987	4X31
Marsha's self-confidence plummets when Don announces his wedding and Marsha can't get a handsome date to take to the ceremony.
66	7	"Mother Bernly"	Unknown	Unknown	October 24, 1987	4X33
Judy's mother gets a job in the Barkley cafeteria and---hungry for a son-in-law---proceeds to interfere in her daughter's personal life.
67	8	"One of the Girls"	Unknown	Unknown	October 31, 1987	4X34
When his old flame starts working at Barkley Foods, Bud tries to fan the fire, but the woman (Gail Strickland), whose sexual interests have changed, wants to douse it.
68	9	"Morgan by Moonlight"	Unknown	Unknown	November 7, 1987	4X35
Morgan's work performance suffers when he takes a second job to make ends meet, so the girls persuade him to demand a raise since he hasn't had one in six years.
69	10	"The Poker Game"	Unknown	Unknown	November 14, 1987	4X36
Bud initially declines Felb's challenge to a poker game, but eventually folds to his gambling addiction.
70	11	"Marsha's Short Story"	Unknown	Unknown	November 21, 1987	4X37
When a psychologist comes to evaluate Barkley employees everyone goes nuts and spills their guts, including short Marsha, who thinks salary is related to height.
71	12	"It Happened One Night"	Unknown	Unknown	December 5, 1987	4X38
Doralee accompanies Bud on a business trip to Paris, where her luggage is lost and the two are forced to share a room---which causes rumors to fly at the office.
72	13	"My Fair Marsha"	Unknown	Unknown	December 12, 1987	4X39
Marsha is courted by Mr. Barkley's son Ellison (Douglas Barr), who tries to mold her into the perfect upper-class woman.
73	14	"Barkley Strikes Out"	Unknown	Unknown	December 19, 1987	4X10
When the secretaries organize a strike, Marsha can't decide whether to follow her conscience or her pocketbook, while Doralee refuses outright to join her peers.
74	15	"James in Love"	Unknown	Unknown	January 9, 1988	4X43
When the janitor gets engaged, the girls plan a coed bridal shower for his fiancée (Mari Gorman), while the men in the office throw a macho bachelor party.
75	16	"The Witches of Barkley"	Unknown	Unknown	January 16, 1988	4X42
The girls put a curse on Felb, then panic when it seems to be working.
76	17	"Felb Slept Here"	Unknown	Unknown	January 23, 1988	4X41
When Felb's wife kicks him out of the house, Marsha reluctantly agrees to take him in---until the situation becomes unbearable.
77	18	"The Big Sleep"	Unknown	Unknown	January 30, 1988	4X44
When Mr. Barkley dies, his daughter asks Bud to take over the company---but there's a hitch.
78	19	"The Custody Fight"	Unknown	Unknown	February 6, 1988	4X45
Marsha's ex asks for joint custody of their children, but when the going gets tough, he wants the kids to get going.
79	20	"Strictly Personal"	Unknown	Unknown	February 13, 1988	4X46
After hearing about how Doralee's friend met her husband through the personals, Marsha and Judy both take out ads.
80	21	"Play Fatal Attraction for Me"	Unknown	Unknown	February 20, 1988	4X47
Felb's niece chooses Bud as the subject for her school thesis---and as the subject of her obsessive love.
81	22	"Marsha's Lie"	Unknown	Unknown	February 27, 1988	4X48
When Felb misplaces an important report, he gets Marsha to lie for him, and a man (Steve Landesberg) in the mailroom is demoted as a result.
82	23	"Felb's Big Secret"	Unknown	Unknown	March 5, 1988	4X49
When Marsha finally meets the woman she suspects is Felb's mistress, she discovers a surprising side of her boss.
83	24	"Marsha Grows Up"	Unknown	Unknown	March 12, 1988	4X50
Jealous of her ex-husband's young new wife, Marsha decides to update her image---and turns into a valley girl.
84	25	"Rockabye Bernly"	Unknown	Unknown	March 19, 1988	4X51
Judy's an instant mother when an old friend pays her a brief surprise visit---and leaves her baby behind.
85	26	"Goodbye, Pops"	Unknown	Unknown	March 26, 1988	4X52
Pops Dugan's funeral becomes an embarrassment when everyone realizes how little they actually knew him. Meanwhile, Felb spreads a nasty rumor about Russ.
