= Past Tense (1994 film) =

- Genre: Crime; Mystery; Thriller
- Written by: Scott Frost; Miguel Tejada-Flores
- Directed by: Graeme Clifford
- Starring: Scott Glenn; Anthony LaPaglia; Lara Flynn Boyle; David Ogden Stiers; Sheree J. Wilson
- Music by: Stephen Graziano
- Country of origin: United States
- Original language: English

Production
- Executive producers: Anne Kopelson; Arnold Kopelson
- Producers: Stephen Brown; Nana Greenwald; Paul Kurta
- Cinematography: Charles Minsky
- Editor: Paul Rubell
- Running time: 91 minutes
- Production companies: Republic Pictures; Viacom Productions

Original release
- Network: Showtime
- Release: June 12, 1994

Past Tense is a 1994 American mystery television film directed by Graeme Clifford and starring Scott Glenn, Anthony LaPaglia and Lara Flynn Boyle. It aired on Showtime on June 12, 1994.

== Plot ==
Police detective and part-time novelist Gene Ralston (Scott Glenn) wakes from a nightmare in which he struggles with another man at a sand quarry, falls, and suffocates when he is covered with sand. In the morning he notices that a new neighbor has moved into the house across the street. Introducing herself to him, Tory Bass (Lara Flynn Boyle) exhibits a skittish manner and admits she is preoccupied by the feeling that someone has been murdered. Gene tells Tory that he is a policeman, and she admits that she was involved with a man who is also a cop.

That evening, Gene has his partner Larry Talbert (Anthony LaPaglia) and his wife Emily (Sheree J. Wilson) over for dinner and they talk about Gene's developing career as a writer, but Gene has his mind on Tory and occasionally glances over at her house across the street. The next day Gene goes to visit Tory and there is an immediate attraction as she opens up to him, and they make love on her living room floor. Later in the day a delivery man brings Gene some roses from Tory with a note inviting him to come over after dark, but when Gene arrives he discovers that she's been murdered. Larry heads up the murder investigation and orders Gene off of the case due to his involvement with the victim.

Nevertheless, Gene investigates anyway, and discovers that the dead girl's body isn't marked by a distinctive cut on her hand that Gene knows was there. Further complicating matters, Emily attempts to seduce Gene.

In the squad room, when Gene starts to discuss the case, Larry has no idea what he is talking about, as Larry is unaware of any murder. And when Gene goes to the house where he met Tory, another woman is living there. It is as if Tory never existed. Confused, Gene consults Police Department psychiatrist, Dr Bert James (David Ogden Stiers), who admits he doesn't understand what Gene is experiencing. As Gene continues writing his novel, he wonders what is going on. Further investigation reveals that, under a different name, the woman that Gene knows as Tory was involved in a previous homicide case and that Larry knows about it.

Following Larry to a hospital, Gene discovers that he has been dreaming, as he awakens from a coma he has been in for 13 months since he actually was buried in a sand pit and had his oxygen supply cut off. What we have seen to this point has been the attempt of Gene's unconscious mind to forge a coherent story out of a mélange of true memories, such as the sand pit, misremembered items, like the "Tory" character, and what has filtered through while in the coma, as for instance Dr James, who is, in reality, Gene's attending neurologist.

Now that he is awake, he is contacted by "Tory" who has been waiting for him to come out of his coma. It turns out that there was more to the murder case she was involved with than Gene and Larry exposed before Gene fell into the quarry. Rearranging clues that his subconscious was playing with while comatose, Gene works to finally crack the case.

== Cast ==
- Scott Glenn as Gene Ralston
- Anthony LaPaglia as Larry Talbert
- Lara Flynn Boyle as Tory Bass
- David Ogden Stiers as Dr. Bert James
- Sheree J. Wilson as Emily Talbert
- Marita Geraghty as Dawn Tripplet
- Duane Davis as Alex Poole
- Ned Van Zandt as Frank Butler
- Mark Phelan as Crime Scene Cop
- Marianne Muellerleile as Moving Company Receptionist
- Kevin Michael Richardson as Arresting Cop
- Kirk Jordan as Detective
