= Shari Belafonte =

American actress (born 1954)

- Belafonte in Hotel (1984)
- Born: Shari Lynn Belafonte; September 22, 1954 (age 72); New York City, U.S.
- Occupations: Actress; model; singer
- Years active: 1977–present
- Spouses: Robert Harper (m. 1977–1988); Sam Behrens (m. 1989)
- Father: Harry Belafonte

Shari Lynn Belafonte (born September 22, 1954) is an American actress, model and singer. The daughter of singer and actor Harry Belafonte, she began her career as a fashion model before making her big screen debut appearing in the 1982 drama film If You Could See What I Hear. She is best known for her role as Julie Gillette in the ABC drama series Hotel from 1983 to 1988. She later went to star in the Canadian science fiction series Beyond Reality (1991–1993). Belafonte also released two studio albums in the 1980s, and acted on stage in later years.

== Early life ==
Shari Belafonte is the second daughter of Marguerite (née Byrd), a psychologist, and Harry Belafonte, the world-famous singer, actor, and civil rights activist. Her parents separated when her mother was pregnant with her. She attended Georgetown Day School in Washington, D.C.; Windsor Mountain School in Lenox, Massachusetts; and Buxton School in Williamstown, Massachusetts; and then Hampshire College in Amherst, Massachusetts before transferring to Carnegie-Mellon University in Pittsburgh where she earned her Bachelor of Fine Arts degree in drama. Her paternal grandmother was born in Jamaica, the child of a Scottish Jamaican mother and an Afro-Jamaican father. Her paternal grandfather also was born in Jamaica, the child of a Black mother and Dutch-Jewish father of Sephardic Jewish descent. She has one older sister Adrienne and a half-brother and sister on her father's side.

== Career ==
=== 1980s ===
Belafonte began her career as a model, becoming a successful cover girl model and appearing in commercials for Calvin Klein jeans. She made her feature film debut in 1982 in the movies Time Walker and If You Could See What I Hear. She then worked as a production assistant and assistant director in public television on the East Coast before moving to Los Angeles, where she became an assistant to the publicist at Hanna-Barbera productions. While getting her hands wet "behind the scenes", she also received a number of modeling and commercial assignments, and was known to have appeared on the covers of over 300 magazines as of 2015. Other feature films include Speed Zone, the made-for-television horror-comedy film The Midnight Hour, in which she also sang a song titled "Get Dead", and Fire, Ice and Dynamite.

The television producer Aaron Spelling chose Belafonte as a finalist for Julie Rogers on Charlie's Angels, a role written with her specifically in mind, but the part instead went to Tanya Roberts. In 1981 she was cast as a fashion model in a 2nd-season episode of Hart to Hart.

In 1984, Spelling did choose her for another pilot, this one for the action-adventure series Velvet alongside Leah Ayres, Mary Margaret Humes, and Sheree J. Wilson. In the same year, Spelling signed Belafonte as Julie Gilette in the ABC drama series Hotel, in which she starred during the show's five-year run, which extended from 1983 to 1988. It was during this time that, Belafonte began her music career by signing a contract to record on the Metronome Records label, releasing two studio albums; these were Eyes of Night in 1987 and Shari in 1989.

=== 1990s–present ===
In 1990, Belafonte made her theatrical debut in Tamara, playing the title role in the long-running Los Angeles production. Shortly thereafter, she starred as Dr. Laura Wingate in the USA Network's drama series Beyond Reality, which ran for two seasons from 1991 to 1993. She co-starred in a number of made-for-television movies in 1990s, including French Silk (1994) starring Susan Lucci, The Heidi Chronicles (1995) starring Jamie Lee Curtis, Babylon 5: Thirdspace (1998) and Loving Evangeline (1999). In addition, she co-hosted the syndicated series Lifestyles with Robin Leach and Shari Belafonte (1994–95), an updated version of Leach's signature program, Lifestyles of the Rich and Famous. In 2006, she hosted a travel program called "Travels in Mexico and the Caribbean with Shari Belafonte" on NYC Media.

Belafonte's multi-faceted career also includes moderating and voiceovers. Belafonte provided the voice of Gerald's mother, Mrs. Johanssen, in four episodes of Hey Arnold!, Diana Cruz in an episode of The Real Adventures of Jonny Quest, and the undead Southern belle zombie Blanche in Gravedale High. She has producing credits for theater, public and network television, and feature films. In addition to her affiliation with numerous children's, animal, and environment causes, she has also become the international spokesman for the Starlight Children's Foundation. Named by the Wall Street Journal as one of the top ten celebrity endorsers, Shari has been the spokesman for numerous corporations including Bally's International Health and Fitness, Slim-Fast, Diet System 6, and Estroven.

In 2000s, Belafonte made a number of limited screen appearances, guest starring in an episode of The District and Nip/Tuck. In December 2015, it was announced that Belafonte would take over the role of Mayor Janice Lomax from Saidah Arrika Ekulona on January 19, 2016, on the ABC daytime soap opera General Hospital. She made her last appearance on December 20, 2017. In 2019, she began appearing in a recurring role as Julia in the Apple TV+ drama series The Morning Show. Later that year, she took the recurring role as Ebony Obsidian's character's mother in the BET comedy-drama series, Sistas.

== Personal life ==
Belafonte has been married twice, first to Robert Harper (May 21, 1977 – 1988). She has been married to Sam Behrens since December 31, 1989. Belafonte posed nude for Playboy in the magazine's September 2000 edition, and is herself an avid photographer.

== Filmography ==
=== Film ===
Year	Title	Role	Notes	Ref
1982	If You Could See What I Hear	Heather Johnson	Biography/drama movie about blind musician Tom Sullivan.; Directed by Eric Till.	
1982	Time Walker	Linda Flores	Also known as Being from Another Planet; B-movie directed by Tom Kennedy.	
1984	Overnight Sensation	Daphne	Short film	
1989	Speed Zone	Margaret	Also known as Cannonball Fever; A comedy film set around an illegal cross-country race (inspired by the Cannonball Baker Sea-to-Shining-Sea Memorial Trophy Dash).	
1990	Murder by Numbers	Lisa	Directed and written by Paul Leder.	
1990	Fire, Ice and Dynamite	Serena	German original title Feuer, Eis und Dynamit; German feature length sports film directed by Willy Bogner.; Sequel to Fire and Ice.	
1992	The Player	The Player	Cameo	
1997	Mars	Doc Halliday	Directed by Jon Hess.	
2014	Teacher of the Year	Robin Rivers		
2015	Primrose Lane	Dr. Hunt	World Music & Independent Film Festival Award for Best Actress in Supporting Role	
2017	Confessions of a Teenage Jesus Jerk	Flo		
2018	Plastic Daydream	Hazel Montgomery	Directed by Kathy Kolla.	
2018	Say Yes	Dr. Bauman		

=== Television ===
Year	Title	Role	Notes	Ref
1979	The Big Hex of Little Lulu	Janie	A made-for-television film	
1981	The Misadventures of Sheriff Lobo	Bank Teller	Episode: "What're Girls Like You Doing in a Bank Like This?"	
1981	Hart to Hart	Cleo	Episode: "The Latest In High Fashion Murder"	
1982	Trapper John, M.D.	Maggie	Episode: "Three on a Mismatch"	
1982	Diff'rent Strokes	Monique	Episode: "The Older Woman"	
1983–1988	Hotel	Julie Gillette	Series regular, 115 episodes Bambi Award (1985)	
1983	Battle of the Network Stars	ABC Team	Episode: "Special #15"	
1983	Family Feud	Herself	Episode: "Battle of the Perfect 10s"	
1984	The Love Boat	Terry Cook	Episode: "Love Is Blind/Baby Makers/Lady & The Maid/Luise Rainer"	
1984	Velvet	Julie Rhodes	A made-for-television film directed by Richard Lang.	
1984	Battle of the Network Stars	Host	Episode: "Special #16"	
1985	Matt Houston	Joanna	Episode: "New Orleans Nightmare"	
1985	The Midnight Hour	Melissa Cavender	Also known as In the Midnight Hour.; An American comedy-horror film.; A made-for-television film directed by Jack Bender.	
1986	Kate's Secret	Gail	A made-for-television film directed by Arthur Allan Seidelman	
1987	Square One TV	Herself	Episode: "Episode 107"	
1987	The Late Show	Herself	Original Host was Joan Rivers.; Episode: "October 13, 1986"	
1989	The Women of Brewster Place	Cameo appearance	Uncredited; American television miniseries based upon the critically acclaimed 1982 novel of the same name by Gloria Naylor.	
1989	Hanna-Barbera's 50th: A Yabba Dabba Doo Celebration	Herself	Also known as A Yabba Dabba Doo Celebration: 50 Years of Hanna-Barbera.; A live-action and animated television special hosted by Tony Danza and Annie Potts.	
1989	Perry Mason: The Case of the All-Star Assassin	Kathy Grant	12th made-for-television film based on Perry Mason.	
1990	Gravedale High	Blanche	Also known as Rick Moranis in Gravedale High; Animated series; Main cast	
1991	The Jaleel White Special	Herself		
1991–1993	Beyond Reality	Laura Wingate	Main cast	
1994	French Silk	Martine	A romance film based on the romance novel written by Sandra Brown and published in 1992.; A made-for-television film.	
1994	Sonic the Hedgehog	Lupe Wolf		
1995	The Heidi Chronicles	April Lambert	A made-for-television film by Wendy Wasserstein adapted from her play of the same name.	
1996–1997	Hey Arnold!	Mrs. Johanssen (voice)	Recurring seasons 1 and 2.	
1997	The Real Adventures of Jonny Quest	Diana Cruz (voice)	Episode: "Other Space"	
1998	Babylon 5: Thirdspace	Elizabeth Trent	A made-for-television film that is part of the Babylon 5 science fiction universe.; Written by J. Michael Straczynski and directed by Jesús Salvador Treviño.	
1998	Loving Evangeline	Ellen Beecham	A made-for-television film	
2000	The Octopus Show	Narrator		
2001	The District	Esther Henderson	Episode: "The Project"	
2003	It's Christopher Lowell	Herself	Episode: "Do-Gooders"	
2004	The Oprah Winfrey Show	Herself		
2008	Nip/Tuck	Catherine Wicke	Episode: "Lulu Grandiron"	
2010	Miami Medical	Kimberly Davis	Episode: "Golden Hour"	
2016–2017	General Hospital	Mayor Janice Lomax	Unknown episodes	
2019	gen:LOCK	Roberta Chase	Episode: "The Pilot"	
2019–present	The Morning Show	Julia	Recurring role Nominated – Screen Actors Guild Award for Outstanding Performance by an Ensemble in a Drama Series (2021 & 2024)	
2019–present	Sistas	Lisa Mott	Recurring role	
2020	9-1-1	Shirley	Episode: "Seize the Day"	
2023	Station 19	Gertrude Rose	Episode: "We Build Then We Break"	

== Discography ==
- Eyes Of Night (1987)
- Shari (1989)
