= Franklin M. Loew =

American academic administrator (1939–2003)

Franklin Loew
- Born: 1939; Syracuse, NY
- Died: 2003 (aged 63–64); Boston, MA
- Education: Cornell University
- Known for: animal rights, ethics, animals and public policy
- Scientific career
- Fields: Veterinary medicine
- Workplaces: University of Saskatchewan; Johns Hopkins University; Tufts University; Cornell University; Becker College

Franklin Martin Loew (1939 in Syracuse, NY – 2003 in Boston, MA) was president of Becker College, dean of the College of Veterinary Medicine at Cornell University and dean of Tufts University School of Veterinary Medicine (now Tufts Cummings School of Veterinary Medicine).

== Early career ==
Loew grew up in Syracuse, New York. He received his undergraduate degree and Doctor of Veterinary Medicine from Cornell and a doctorate in nutrition from the University of Saskatchewan. During the 1970s, Loew was one of the many members of the research team that developed canola oil. In 1977, the Governor-General of Canada awarded Loew a Queen's Jubilee Medal. In the same year, he became the head of the Division of Comparative Medicine at Johns Hopkins University.

== Tufts ==
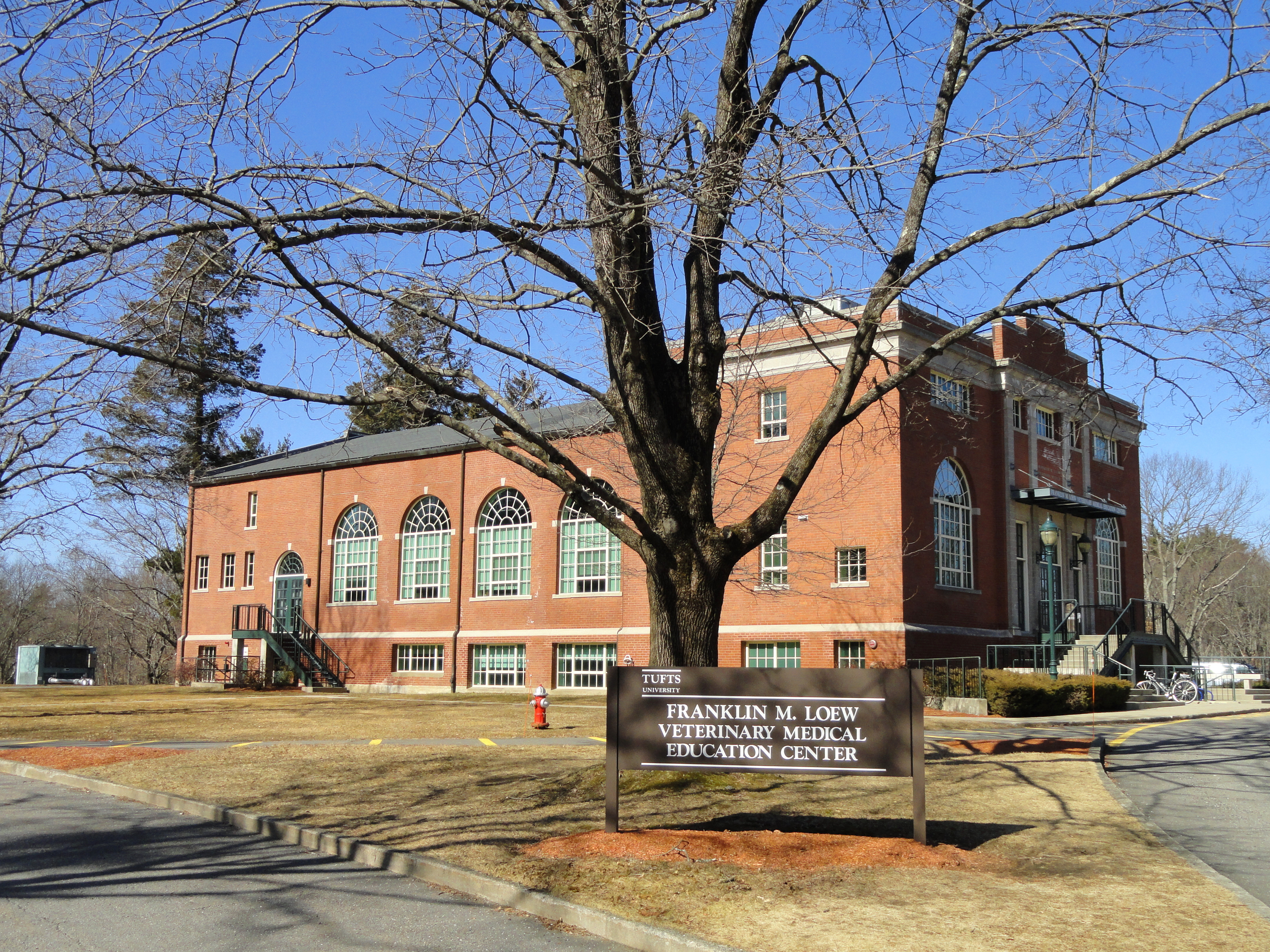
Franklin M. Loew Veterinary Medical Education Center - Cummings School of Veterinary Medicine - North Grafton, MA - DSC04490

Loew became the second dean of the Tufts University School of Veterinary Medicine in 1982. While at Tufts, he built up the institution in many ways creating the Center for Animals and Public Policy and Wildlife Clinic. He also developed the university's biotechnology park and built partnerships between the university and biotechnology companies. In addition, he built up the school's programs in equine sports medicine, wildlife medicine, conservation medicine, and ethics and values. The Franklin M. Loew Veterinary Education Center on the Grafton campus is named for him.

== Later career ==
After leaving Tufts in 1995, Loew became the dean of the Cornell University School of Veterinary Medicine, his alma mater. He remained at Cornell until 1997, and after a brief term as chief executive of Medical Foods, Inc., since purchased by Amerifit Brands, he returned to academia and was hired as president of Becker College. While at Becker, Loew added four degree programs and the number of students pursuing baccalaureate degrees rose by almost 50%. He remained at Becker until his death in 2003. In 2004, he was posthumously awarded the AVMA Animal Welfare Award. In 2009, Becker College created the Franklin M. Loew Lecture Series in his honor. The Society for Veterinary Medical Ethics (SVME) posthumously awarded Loew its Robert Shomer Award in 2011.

Loew was an elected member of the National Academy of Science's Institute of Medicine in 1992—and of a number of other learned societies such as the American Antiquarian Society. He was also a visiting scientist at MIT and a senior fellow at Tufts.

Loew served as a consultant to many universities, foundations, government agencies and companies, including Columbia and Ohio State Universities, the Howard Hughes Medical Institute, the Pew Charitable Trusts, the U.S. Food and Drug Administration, the National Institutes of Health, NASA, the Smithsonian Institution and the U.S. Department of Agriculture. He was also a member of several nonprofit boards of trustees such as the New England Aquarium and the Tuskegee Advisory Committee for the Center of Bioethics and Health Care Policy.

== Selected publications ==
- Vet in the Saddle, 1978
- Laboratory Animal Medicine. James G. Fox, Bennett J. Cohen, Franklin M. Loew, eds. Orlando, Fla: Academic Press. 1984.
- Loew, Franklin (November 1987) "The Animal Welfare Bête Noire in Veterinary Medicine", Canadian Veterinary Journal 28 689-692.
- Loew, F.M. 1994. Beyond transgenics: Ethics and values. Brit. Vet. J. 150: 3−5.
- Rowan, Andrew N., Franklin M. Loew, and Joan C. Weer. The Animal Research Controversy: Protest, Process & Public Policy: An Analysis of Strategic Issues. North Grafton, MA: Center for Animals & Public Policy, Tufts University School of Veterinary Medicine, 1995.

== See also ==
- Animal testing
