= Fredric Lean =

- Occupation(s): Writer, director, producer

Fredric Lean (aka: Mr.Flean) is a French / American documentary filmmaker known for his sports-related documentaries, AI artist, NFT creations, published comic book author and co-founder of a fine art gallery in Miami.

== Biography ==
Born in France to a family of Italian origin. Lean was up in a musical and artistic family. At the University of California, Los Angeles (U.C.L.A) Lean studied Film and Television.

At a very early age, he participated in 2 LP records, as a lead vocal, with Max Berlin (aka: Jean-Pierre Cerrone). One record was called 'Dream Disco', followed by 'New Wave' a few years after. Cerrone the French disco-pop icon is his uncle.

After developing several different business ventures in Europe, Lean decided to get his hands on more creative work. Under the pen name Frederic Galfo, he created Wolf; The Last Howl comic book series, which was published by Semic Publications. He then collaborated with a major French TV network M6, Cinegroupe (Canada), showrunner Larry Mollin (The Renegade, Beverly Hills 90210, Largo Winch), and producer Steve Waterman (The Black Stallion, Stuart Little 1 & 2, Alvin & the Chipmunks) to create an international co-production for the adaptation of a best-selling French comic book series called Docteur Justice (aka: Dr. Justice) published in comics book series called Pif Gadget.

In order to re-launch the comic franchise, Lean established the first and only website dedicated solely to Dr. Justice. In 2003 and 2004, the site received the international Golden Web Awards.

Lean made his directorial debut with Fragile,, a 27-minute drama starring Sheree J. Wilson known for prime-time television series Dallas and Walker, Texas Ranger. At the 2006 Cannes Film Festival, the mini-DV short was part of the Official Selection of the Short Film Corner.

With the help of the United Nations High Commissioner for Refugees (UNHCR) and IRC, Fredric Lean finished his first feature documentary, Iraq: The Wind of Hope-The Wind of Al-Amal. The feature documentary examines the complicated struggle and fractured lives of some Iraqi immigrants and exiles as they strive to fit into the American landscape while grappling with their past demons. In June 2012, the film was screened at the United Nations High Commissioner for Refugees headquarters in New York. He mentioned in an interview that it took him four years to complete due to a lack of funding and mainstream media interest. Except for a few scenes shot in Iraq and the United States, it was primarily a one-man crew film (himself).

Skydancers, his second documentary, is a one-hour movie that is part of a series of episodes about women in aviation. The first episode features some of the best female aerobatics pilots in the world. Lean received awards for 'Best Director,' 'Best Feature Documentary,' 'Best Concept,' and 'Best Cinematography.'

The film was awarded third place in the 'Best Feature Documentary' category at the All Sports Los Angeles Film Festival in November 2014.

The film was part of the official selection selected at the Palm Beach International Film Festival.

Astra-Satellite broadcast the film in over 35 countries, reaching over 93 million direct-to-home (DTH) viewers, making Lean's film the most widely televised documentary about women in aviation.

His work has been featured on a variety of streaming platforms, including Netflix, Apple TV, Amazon Prime Video, Hulu, RedBull Media House, YouTube, Roku, Comcast and Sony.
