= Jochen Schweizer =

German entrepreneur (born 1957)

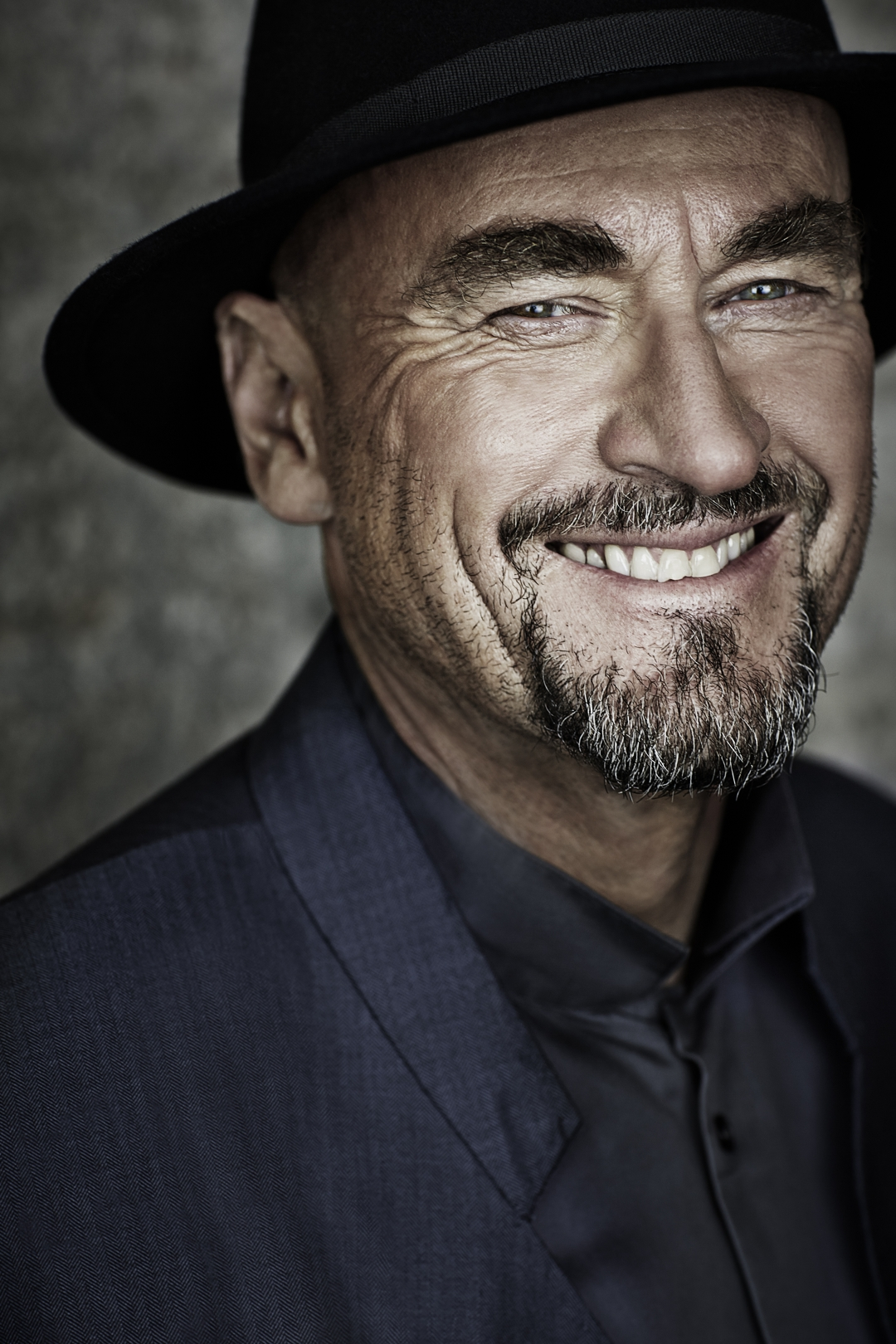
- Schweizer in 2014
- Born: 23 June 1957 (age 69); Ettlingen, Germany
- Occupation: Entrepreneur
- Website: jochen-schweizer.de

Jochen Schweizer (born 23 June 1957) is a German entrepreneur. He founded the eponymous group of companies that offers, among other things, experience vouchers. Schweizer does extreme sports and bungee jumping. He has worked as a stuntman in films and advertising, set several world records and appears several times in the Guinness Book of World Records. Schweizer also works as a motivational speaker.

== Biography ==
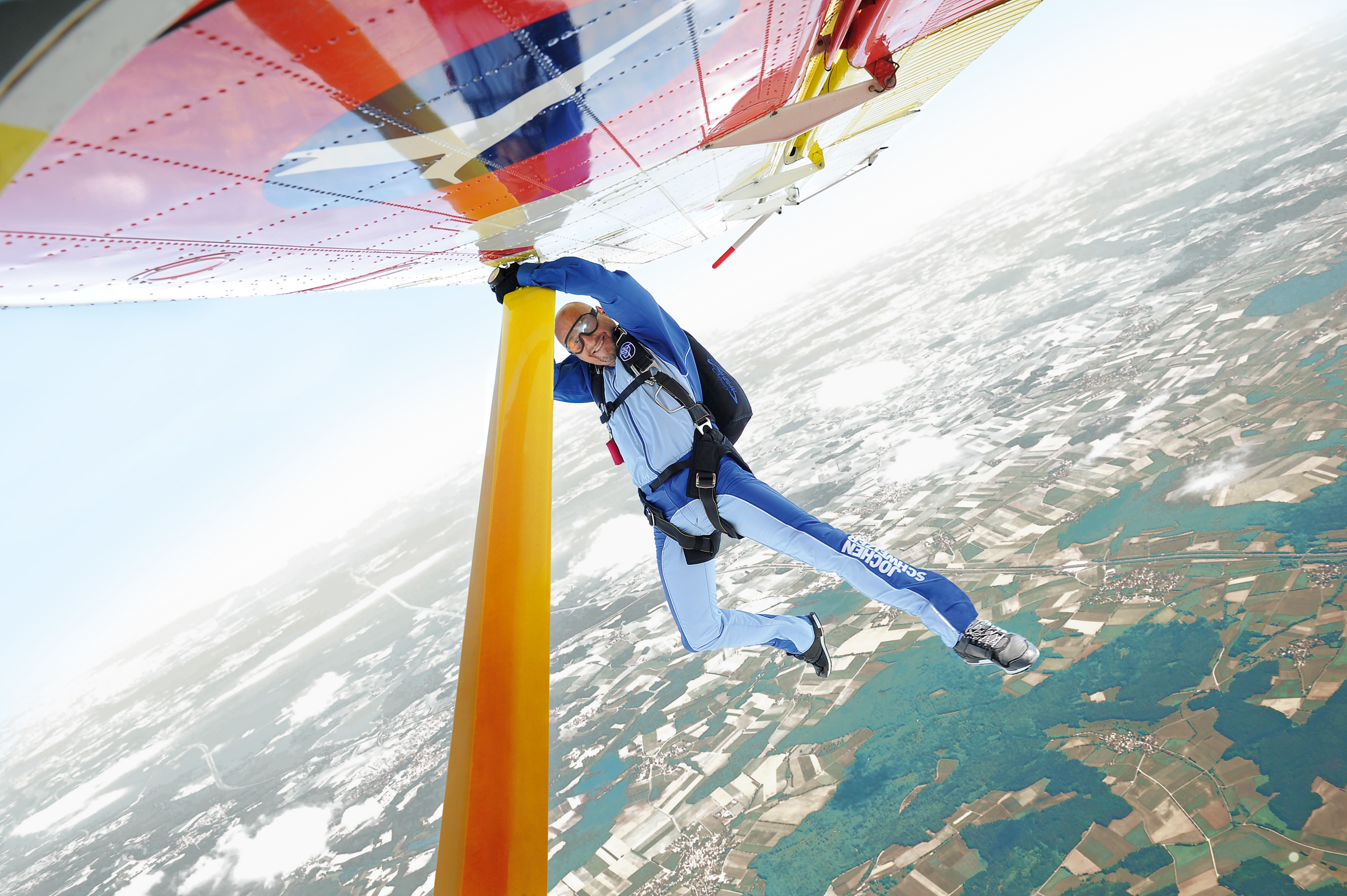
Schweizer in 2014

=== Education and world records ===
Schweizer was born in Ettlingen near Karlsruhe, he grew up in Heidelberg. After the Abitur, he traveled through Africa. Working for an international freight forwarding company, he first led shipments for the Deutsche Gesellschaft für Internationale Zusammenarbeit in West Africa and was subsequently appointed Managing Director of the new branch office in Munich. In the 1980s, Schweizer had various engagements as a stuntman. He performed a bungee jump in Willy Bogner's action film "Fire, Ice and Dynamite". In the following years, Schweizer set several world records, including in 1997 for the jump from a helicopter with the longest bungee rope and the highest fall distance of 1,050 meters.

=== Entrepreneurial activities ===
In 1985, Schweizer founded the event and advertising agency Kajak Sports Productions, headquartered in Munich. This company later became the foundation for the Jochen Schweizer Group. Kajak Sports Productions produced several fun sports and action sports movies, such as "Mad Family", "Over the Edge", "Topolinaden" and "Verdon – Die Schlucht gestern und heute". In 1989 the company opened the first stationary facility in Germany, located in Oberschleißheim. It is the oldest still active jumping facility in Europe. In subsequent years the company expanded its activities to include other activities and adventures, such as the vertical catwalk show.

Schweizer's companies faced a major crisis in 2003 due to a fatal accident at the Florianturm in Dortmund. The company changed its business and focused on selling experiences from then on. In 2004 the company started to sell experience vouchers over the Internet. Later, they opened their own stores in Germany, with experience vouchers also sold through trading partners. In 2015, the Jochen Schweizer Group offered a total of 1,900 different experiences, and employed 500 people.

=== Literary works ===
In 2010, Schweizer published his biography entitled "Warum Menschen fliegen können müssen" ("Why People Have to Be Able to Fly"). The book appeared in 2014 as an audio book. In 2015 Schweizer published his second book "Der perfekte Moment" ("The Perfect Moment").
