= Gravedale High =

- Also known as: Rick Moranis in Gravedale High
- Genre: Comedy horror
- Created by: David Kirschner
- Developed by: Ernie Contreras; Glenn Leopold
- Written by: Ernie Contreras; Ted Himmel; Glenn Leopold; Bruce Reid Shaifer
- Starring: Rick Moranis as Max Schneider
- Voices of: Shari Belafonte; Eileen Brennan; Georgia Brown; Tim Curry; Barry Gordon; Sandra Gould; Jackie Earle Haley; Ricki Lake; Maurice LaMarche; Brock Peters; Kimmy Robertson; Roger Rose; Frank Welker; Jonathan Winters
- Theme music composer: Tyrell Music Group
- Composers: Thomas Chase; Steve Rucker
- Country of origin: United States
- Original language: English
- No. of seasons: 1
- No. of episodes: 13

Production
- Executive producers: David Kirschner; Paul Sabella
- Running time: 30 minutes
- Production companies: H-B Production Co.; NBC Productions

Original release
- Network: NBC
- Release: September 8 – December 1, 1990

Gravedale High (also known as Rick Moranis in Gravedale High) is an American animated series produced by H-B Productions Co. for NBC Productions (the latter company owns all rights to the series). The series premiered in the fall of 1990 on NBC as part of its Saturday morning children's lineup and lasted thirteen episodes.

The show was developed as an animated vehicle for Moranis, building on his star appearances in the series of Ghostbusters and Honey, I Shrunk the Kids film franchises.

== Premise ==
The show revolves around the misadventures of human teacher Max Schneider who has unwittingly taken a job at Gravedale High, a school for monsters, near the city of Midtown. Schneider, the only human in the school, presides over a group of ghoulish teenagers that are latest-generation versions of classic movie monsters.

Most of Schneider's students are either disruptive, uninterested, and/or unduly self-preoccupied in school, and the class is generally considered disreputable if not uncontrollable (not unlike "the Sweathogs" in Welcome Back, Kotter), the implication being Schneider was hired to teach the class because no monster teacher would take the job.

The actual "town" of Gravedale is occasionally seen and consists primarily of various cemeteries including the Eastside Cemetery and the Midtown Mausoleum. It can thus arguably be considered a "suburb" of Midtown, although few humans seem to know of its existence. In addition to the students' homes, it is known to include a doctor's office (which is run by a medical version of Dr. Jekyll and Mr. Hyde as seen in "Fear of Flying") and a literal body shop where people can purchase parts to assemble monsters. The existence of a charitable organization known as the United Monster Fund (dedicated to helping schools like Gravedale High "around the world") indicates Gravedale is part of an entire monster subculture.

== Characters ==
=== Main characters ===
- Maxwell Schneider (voiced by Rick Moranis) - A human teacher with a very thin physique. Very much the grown up nerd and very proud of being a teacher who can make a difference. Dresses in a plain preppy business suit attire. He always wears a polka-dotted bow tie and thick dark horn-rimmed glasses, and he has wavy auburn hair and warm brown eyes. His personality is quirky but very steady (it has to be, given his being in charge of his motley young crew); he is friendly, fun, open-minded, and one of the hardest-working teachers on the Gravedale High staff. He often wears hats or wigs related to his lesson of the day (i.e. an Albert Einstein wig during a science lecture). He would be just like one of the monsters if he was not human. A dedicated instructor who truly cares for each of his students.
- Vinnie Stoker (voiced by Roger Rose) - A Fonz-esque version of Count Dracula. His name is an homage to Bram Stoker and the commonality in fiction of giving vampires names that begin with V. He dresses like a 1950s greaser and often arrives late to class, which stems more from his lack of interest in academia than nocturnal habits. This is source of much debate between Schneider and Vinnie, who spends a lot of his time keeping Vinnie's boots off his desk. Vinnie is lazy by nature, but will do "studious things" or hard work if it serves his best interest.
- Frankentyke (voiced by Frank Welker) - A short Frankenstein teenager. His short stature is the antithesis of the classic image of a hulking, frightening monster. As seen in Night of the Living Dad, his father is a human scientist who evidently created him; he apparently has no mother.
- Reggie Moonshroud (voiced by Barry Gordon) - A red-haired werewolf, Reggie is prone to shedding a great deal when nervous, and may sometimes howl, but generally has his emotions under control (contrasting the image of werewolves having carnal instincts). As a nod to Richie Cunningham from Happy Days, he and the Fonz-like Vinnie are best friends, which also embodies the antithesis of the classic monster movie genre, which often depicts werewolves and vampires as mortal enemies.
- J.P. Ghastly III (voiced by Frank Welker impersonating Peter Lorre) - A wealthy blue-skinned ghoul. Sid once referred to him as a "quirk," which, if taken literally, implies that he is one of a kind and, indeed, his monster classification is unidentified. There is a bit of rivalry between him and Vinnie.
- Gill Waterman (voiced by Jackie Earle Haley) - A lagoon monster surfer. His name is a pun on both terms, and he overuses surfer lingo. Best friends with Frankentyke, Gill likes to surf, idolizes famed surfer Kahuna Bob (who is aware of the existence of Gravedale), and has a voracious appetite. As seen in Night of the Living Dad, Gil's parents dress in attire associated with the aristocracy of the Southern United States (perhaps as a nod to the Black Lagoon's location in South America), but Mr. Waterman shares his son's fondness for surfer lingo.
- Cleofatra (voiced by Ricki Lake) - An overweight teenage mummy in contrast to the emaciated appearance generally associated with mummies; she is best friends with Duzer. Her name is usually abbreviated as "Cleo." Best friends with Duzer. Cleofatra has a crush on TV monster celebrity Billy Headstone who is the star of the daytime soap opera "Trudy and the Beast" (which is a parody of the 1980s show Beauty and the Beast).
- Sid (voiced by Maurice LaMarche) - An Invisible teenager. Sid is the class clown and does various impersonations (implying that perhaps his creation and name were inspired by Sid Caesar). He draws attention to himself with his antics as opposed to going unnoticed. Oddly, like many cartoon anthropomorphic animals, Sid apparently does not wear pants, unless his pants are invisible, as the rest of his wardrobe is not. Sid's parents are also talented impersonators as seen in the episode "Night of the Living Dad."
- Blanche (voiced by Shari Belafonte) - A French-accented zombie girl who loves to shop, a literal "mall zombie." Her name and personality comprise a pun on the verb form of "blanche" as a synonym for turning pale, 'carte blanche', and Blanche DuBois (in the episode "Monster Gumbo", she comments that she has "always depended on the kindness of monsters" parodying a line from A Streetcar Named Desire). Blanche frequently dates J.P., although it is implied she finds his money to be his most attractive asset. Blanche is a shopaholic who is frequently teased by her classmates about how many credit cards she has maxed out. She is a bit of a clothes horse. She does sew her own clothes and can cook, though she does not like domestic duties; her ambition being to marry the richest monster in the world. J.P.'s ambition, in turn, is to be the richest monster in the world.
- Duzer (voiced by Kimmy Robertson) - A medusa Valley girl minus the petrifying gaze; her hair includes three snakes who can act of their own accord, much to her irritation since, when in motion, they are strong enough to drag her along with them. She is best friends with Cleo, whom she often drags into various schemes, against Cleo's better judgment. Her response to anyone who annoys her is "Get a life!" which is ironic in that many Gravedale students and staff members are in fact already dead. She is pretty, vain, competitive, bossy, and likes to be the boys' center of attention, particularly that of Vinnie, who she seems to have an unrequited crush on. In the first episode, Duzer replies that she cannot do anything with her snake hair and Cleo offers to help her "get her hair ready for Vinnie." Duzer states that she does not have a crush on Vinnie Stoker. Frankentyke swipes her diary off her desk and reads out loud a passage about that reveals otherwise. Schneider enters the classroom just as Duzer gives chase and states that Frankentyke took her diary. Tyke throws the evidence out the window. Vinnie flies into the window with said diary and tries to read it before Duzer yells at him "If you read that, you're dead." Beyond this, there was no mention of Duzer and Vinnie's relationship in the series.

=== Other students ===
Other recurring students include:

- Alpha-Mae Centauri - A centaur.
- Blobby - A student reminiscent of The Blob.
- Busby - A human fly.
- Elephant Boy (voiced by Frank Welker) - An elephantine parody of the Elephant Man. He speaks with Received Pronunciation. One of two students who campaigned vigorously for Class President (although Vinnie campaigned just for kicks and won).
- Iggy - A hunchbacked student that resembles the archetypical "Igor" type of mad scientist assistant. Iggy has a zipper along the length of his scalp implying he is both hunchback and a Frankenstein-type monster. He tends to forget his brain and is often scolded by Headmistress Crone for this.
- Moorehead - A Metaluna Mutant who is a student in Coach Cadaver's class.
- Nardo - A gargoyle jock who is Vinnie's rival in sports. He is also a student in Coach Cadaver's class.
- Natasha Neckinski - A vampire girl with a Russian accent, contrasting to the thoroughly Americanized Vinnie.
- Rover (voiced by Frank Welker) - A werewolf who speaks in a manner similar to Scooby-Doo.
- Seymour (voiced by Barry Gordon) - A cyclops.
- Suey - A porcine girl. Like Elephant Boy, she vigorously campaigned for Class President. The two performed a Romeo and Juliet-like recital at a talent show, suggesting they are dating.

There are also some unidentified students resembling the monsters from The Brain from Planet Arous, The Crawling Eye, and other films.

=== Teachers ===
The bespectacled Mr. Schneider has his hands full with his new students, but he has Gravedale's spooky staff (where some of them initially do not trust Schneider due to his human status but develop a camaraderie with him as the overall story arc develops) to help him out. Like Schneider, each teacher oversees a specific class of students. Gravedale High's staff include:

- Headmistress Crone (voiced by Georgia Brown) - The strict principal who runs the school with an iron albeit easily-detachable left hand. As her name implies, she is a witch-like monster. Her grandfather Cretin Crone founded the school and later passed it on to his son Addlepate. She can be ruthless to trouble-making monsters and faculty who do not toe the line, but is generally an able administrator. Although Headmistress Crone considered herself taking a risk hiring a human teacher, she knows she made the right decision when Schneider disciplines the unruly "misfit" class and now works to give him support.
  - Clawford (vocal effects provided by Frank Welker) - Headmistress' Crone's undead cat who is periodically seen hunting and being outwitted by a hunchbacked rat called Bella.
- Boneyard (voiced by Brock Peters) - A lanky white-haired staff member dressed like an undertaker. He fills various roles at Gravedale High including bus driver, driver's ed teacher, and Gravedale Gazette printing press operator. He somewhat resembles the Tall Man from the Phantasm films and is a little reminiscent of Digby O'Dell from The Life of Riley.
- Coach Cadaver (voiced by Jonathan Winters) - A strict hot-headed zombie (his head is stitched together at the top, so his brain is removable) who works as a gym teacher. He is categorized by Crone as a "human-hater." Coach Cadaver dislikes Schneider's students (calling them "misfits") as well as Schneider himself (whose hiring he opposed). His nasty attitude is generally disliked, making him a pariah among the Gravedale faculty as opposed to Schenider's easygoing demeanor.
- Miss Dirge (voiced by Eileen Brennan) - A teacher that resembles the Bride of Frankenstein. She shows mild romantic interest in Schneider, as she admits some monster women find human men attractive. Her name is a play on dirge or mournful funeral song.
- Chef Sal Monella (voiced by Maurice LaMarche) - A monster of unspecified variety who works as a chef in the school cafeteria. Sal takes pride in his filthy kitchen. His name is an obvious pun on salmonella.
- Mr. Tutner (voiced by Tim Curry) - A mummy history teacher with bad breath who wears sunglasses, a coat, and a tie. Like Cleofatra, Mr. Tutner is pudgy, contrasting the typical association of mummies with sickliness and emaciation. He gets along well with Schneider and tries to compete for a charity fundraising award by attributing his long life to pyramid power as seen in "Monster Gumbo." He notes that, thanks to pyramid power, he "[doesn't] look a day over five thousand," implying he is significantly older than that.
- Miss Webner (voiced by Sandra Gould) - As the presence of the word "web" in her name suggests, she is a spider-woman, having six arms and two legs.

== Episodes ==
No.	Title	Written by	Original release date
1	"Long Day's Gurney Into Night"	Ernie Contreras & Glenn Leopold	September 8, 1990
When Sid comes down with a sickness, Max ends up having to take him to the Community Hospital since Gravedale High no longer has a doctor or a school nurse (they ran off together). Sid ends up being chased by the doctors when he does not want his tonsils removed. The other Gravedale students do not want to venture into the human world to visit Sid until Max slips into the moat and the class begs Boneyard to drive the bus to get him to the hospital.
2	"Do the Rad Thing"	Christian Schoon and Ernie Contreras & Glenn Leopold	September 15, 1990
While teaching Frankentyke how to surf, Gill ends up meeting a professional surfer named Kahuna Bob. He starts training to become a professional surfer under Bob, but both his schoolwork and friendship with Frakentyke start suffering as a result. Things come to a head when Gil decides to drop out of school and become a professional surfer.
3	"Cleo's Pen Pal"	Bruce Reid Schaefer and Ernie Contreras & Glenn Leopold	September 22, 1990
Cleofatra sends fan-mail to monster actor Billy Headstone who is the star of "Trudy and the Beast", who gets a response that he is in Midtown and would like to have a date with her. Cleo admits that due to her low-self esteem, she has sent Billy a picture of Duzer as herself.
4	"Monster Gumbo"	Glenn Leopold & Ernie Contreras	September 29, 1990
Blanche's secret family recipe for Monster Gumbo proves to be necessary for Max Schneider's class to win a competition for raising charity money against Coach Cadaver's class in a competition to earn money for the United Monster Fund. It is soon targeted by a gumbo chef named Big Daddy.
5	"The Dress-Up Mess-Up"	Chis Schoon and Ernie Contreras & Glenn Leopold	October 6, 1990
The students all chip in to buy Mr. Schneider a reservation at an expensive restaurant as part of a birthday present, but Duzer persuades Cleofatra to lend her the money in a plot to buy an expensive dress, win the Gravedale Fashion Show, and return the dress to get the money back. When Natasha Neckinski's "mongoose stole" is revealed as instead a living "stolen mongoose," the snakes in Duzer's hair are frightened into fleeing dragging Duzer with them and ruining the dress. Duzer is forced to get a job to cover her embezzlement, and is hired at a western-themed burger joint, where her snake attire is a hit.
6	"The Grave Intruder"	Ted Himmel and Ernie Contreras & Glenn Leopold	October 13, 1990
Duzer takes over the Gravedale Gazette turning it into the Gravedale Intruder where she makes up false stories about the students and staff.
7	"Fear of Flying"	Paul Dell & Steven Weiss and Glenn Leopold & Ernie Contreras	October 20, 1990
After Reggie's science project ruins Nardo's play in Footbomb, Nardo ends up challenging Vinnie to "Fly or Splat" (an aerial version of "Chicken" played by flying monsters). When Vinnie ends up struck by lightning and loses his flight ability, the other students help him recover it before his showdown with Nardo.
8	"He Ain't Scary, He's My Brother"	Glenn Leopold & Ernie Contreras	October 27, 1990
Frankentyke's older brother Big Frank, an alumnus of Gravedale, takes time off from his job at the funeral parlor to spend some time with his "little 'bro". Unfortunately for Frankentyke, Blanche, Cleofatra, and Duzer each end up developing a crush on Big Frankie, and their dates are cutting into fun events Frankentyke has planned. However, when Frankentyke and Mr. Schneider run afoul of human thugs, maybe help is on the way.
9	"Frankenjockey"	Bruce Schaefer and Glenn Leopold & Ernie Contreras	November 3, 1990
A horse named Hoover that has never won a horse-race escapes from his owners Colonel Saddlesoar and Liverpool. He has a run-in with Frankentyke during his class' hike and develops a liking for him. Colonel Saddlesoar hires Frankentyke as a jockey for Hoover (upon Max's insistence that Hoover enjoy a peaceful retirement in a nice pasture), but there are other forces at work as Liverpool and a fellow worker plan to see to it that the upcoming horse race gets fixed.
10	"Save Our School"	Ernie Contreras & Glenn Leopold	November 10, 1990
Vinnie, who is flunking civics, is ordered by Schneider to run for student body president in order to learn for himself the importance of government. At the same time, hotel tycoon Belle Gardens plans to have Gravedale High demolished so that she can place one of her Empress Hotels there. Vinnie wins the election, then learns the hard way that leadership is more than a popularity contest when he must first oversee Gravedale High becoming inspection-ready, then appeal to the Midtown selectmen about Belle's targeting of Gravedale's land.
11	"Night of the Living Dad"	Bill Matheny	November 17, 1990
Gravedale High's talent show is coming up and every student's parent will be attending. With help from Gill, Frankentyke builds a phony father for himself in order to hide that his father is human. When Frankentyke and Gill accidentally break the genius brain, they end up getting the brain of a Hollywood agent.
12	"Goodbye Gravedale"	Ernie Contreras & Glenn Leopold	November 24, 1990
As Schneider's class produces a class movie, Mr. Schneider receives an acceptance letter for a Midtown Prep School teaching position which he applied for prior to becoming a Gravedale High teacher. Happy in his current position, he discards the letter, but his students find it. Thinking he is leaving and will use the class movie so that human students can make fun of them, the students turn against him, alienating him so that he does in fact leave Gravedale High to teach at Midtown Prep School. This causes Headmistress Crone to call in substitute teacher after substitute teacher until she can get a replacement. Eventually, the students miss Schneider and he misses them as well. He poses as a substitute teacher named Mr. Creepers. Upon learning the cause of discord, Max Schneider unmasks and everything returns to normal....for Gravedale High.
13	"Monster on Trial"	Story by: Ernie Contreras & Glenn Leopold and Robert Tartow; Teleplay by: Glenn Leopold & Ernie Contreras	December 1, 1990
Reggie Moonshroud's bad driving in Driver's Ed causes Boneyard to give up teaching it, so Max Schneider takes over. His recent bad driving leads to Mr. Schneider getting sued for $1,000,000 when Reggie lightly rear-ends an old lady named Ms. Fresno who claimed that Reggie and Max fiercely rear-ended her. When Ms. Fresno wins the case with her side of the story causing Judge Killjoy to sentence Max and his students to prison, Reggie and Frankentyke must find a way to get Max and the others out of jail and expose Ms. Fresno for fraud.

== Cast ==
- Rick Moranis as Max Schneider
- Shari Belafonte as Blanche
- Eileen Brennan as Miss Dirge
- Georgia Brown as Headmistress Crone
- Tim Curry as Mr. Tutner
- Barry Gordon as Reggie Moonshroud, Seymour, City Council Member (in "Save Our School")
- Sandra Gould as Miss Webner
- Jackie Earle Haley as Gill Waterman
- Ricki Lake as Cleofatra
- Maurice LaMarche as Sid, Chef Sal Monella, Bouncer (in "Cleo's Pen Pal"), Big Frankie (in "He Ain't Scary, He's My Brother"), Marty (in "Night of the Living Dad"), Mr. Creepers (in "Goodbye Gravedale")
- Brock Peters as Boneyard
- Kimmy Robertson as Duzer
- Roger Rose as Vinnie Stoker
- Frank Welker as Frankentyke, J.P. Ghastly, Clawford, Elephant Boy, Rover, Roadkill (in "He Ain't Scary, He's My Brother"), Dr. Jekyll and Mr. Hyde (in "Fear of Flying"), Beaver (in "Frankenjocky"), Crow (in "Frankenjocky"), Hoover (in "Frankenjocky"), Porcupine (in "Frankenjocky"), Race Announcer (in "Frankenjocky"), Squirrels (in "Frankenjocky"), Mr. Gross (in "Goodbye Gravedale"), Police Officer (in "Monster on Trial"), Bailiff (in "Monster on Trial"), Prison Officer (in "Monster on Trial")
- Jonathan Winters as Coach Cadaver

=== Additional voices ===
- Charlie Adler
- Lewis Arquette
- Susan Blu
- Sorrell Booke as Big Daddy (in "Monster Gumbo")
- Pat Buttram as Inspector Nitpicker (in "Save Our School")
- Ruth Buzzi as Ms. Fresno (in "Monster on Trial")
- Hamilton Camp as Ape Psychiatrist (in "Fear of Flying"), Tucker (in "Goodbye Gravedale")
- Dena Dietrich
- Joan Gerber
- Phil Hartman as Billy Headstone (in "Cleo's Pen Pal")
- David Lander
- Mitzi McCall as Miss Burns (in "Goodbye Gravedale")
- Edie McClurg
- Tom McHugh
- Howard Morris
- Robert Ridgely as Colonel Saddlesore (in "Frankenjockey")
- Richard Sanders as Benjamin Franklin (in "Goodbye Gravedale")
- Russi Taylor
- B.J. Ward
- William Woodson as Judge Killjoy (in "Monster on Trial")

== Crew ==
- Gordon Hunt - Recording Director
- Jamie Thomason - Talent Coordinator
- Kris Zimmerman - Animation Casting Director
