= Velvet (film) =

American 1984 action/drama TV film

- Title card
- Genre: Action; Drama
- Written by: Ned Wynn
- Directed by: Richard Lang
- Starring: Leah Ayres; Shari Belafonte; Mary-Margaret Humes; Sheree J. Wilson
- Music by: Dominic Frontiere
- Country of origin: United States
- Original language: English

Production
- Producers: Douglas S. Cramer; Aaron Spelling
- Running time: 100 minutes
- Production company: Aaron Spelling Productions

Original release
- Network: ABC
- Release: August 27, 1984

Velvet is a 1984 American action television film directed by Richard Lang, written by Ned Wynn, and produced by Aaron Spelling and Douglas S. Cramer. It stars Leah Ayres, Shari Belafonte, Mary-Margaret Humes and Sheree J. Wilson as government agents working undercover as aerobics instructors, with Polly Bergen as their chief.

The film was a failed pilot for a proposed ABC series. ABC aired it as a standalone TV-movie on August 27, 1984. The broadcast ranked eighth in the weekly Nielsen ratings.

== Plot ==
Four women work as instructors at Velvet International, a chain of aerobics studios that secretly serves as a front for a U.S. intelligence agency. Their chief, Mrs. Vance, oversees the operation and reports to an official in Washington, who tells her the country's top defense specialist has gone missing and that his capture by foreign enemies could tip the balance of power.

Using skills that include skydiving, stunt driving, flying and karate, the agents track the specialist to a marina where he is being held prisoner. One of the villains is unmasked as a disgraced former college professor who traded grades for sexual favors from his female students. Meanwhile, one of the agents fears the mission will keep her from her younger sister's wedding back home on the family farm, though she makes it in time.

== Cast ==
- Leah Ayres as Cass Dayton
- Shari Belafonte (credited as Shari Belafonte-Harper) as Julie Rhodes
- Mary-Margaret Humes as Lauren "Boots" Dawes
- Sheree J. Wilson as Ellen Stockwell
- Polly Bergen as Mrs. Vance
- Michael Ensign as Stefan
- Leigh McCloskey as James Barstow
- Andrea Marcovicci as Erica Mueller
- Bruce Abbott as Breed
- Anthony De Longis as Rawls
- Judson Scott as Mats Edholm
- Bo Brundin as Professor Charles Vandemeer
- David Faustino as Billy Vandemeer
- Clyde Kusatsu as Dr. Edward Yashima
- William Windom as Government Official

== Production ==
Much of the film was shot at the Westin Bonaventure Hotel in downtown Los Angeles.

== Music ==
The score was composed by Dominic Frontiere. The film's theme song had a new wave-influenced sound.

== Reception ==
=== Ratings ===
In the Nielsen ratings for the week of August 27 – September 2, 1984, Velvet ranked eighth among prime-time programs, with a 14.4 rating and a 24 share, approximately 12 million households.

=== Critical response ===
John Corry of The New York Times gave the film a tongue-in-cheek review noting that the film "will not do you irreparable damage" and was "distinguished by its glossiness," with everything shining with "a Southern California, capped-teeth roseate glow." He found the four leads "all awfully pretty," remarking that the film "is almost interesting here; it is showing us the ideal American woman," and joked that the Republican National Committee had "combed the country to find women like that" for its convention the previous week. He also observed that the soundtrack and the agents' contempt for a villain who had exploited his female students suggested that "tampering with the national defense may not be nice, but sexism is unforgivable."

The Variety reviewer wrote that "the physical stunts performed by the four athletic women seemed too obviously the work of stunt people," and noted "the usual liberal dollops of slickness and posh locations that Aaron Spelling is noted for," adding that ABC had passed on the series.
