= Easy Rider: The Ride Back =

2012 film by Dustin Rikert

- Theatrical release poster
- Directed by: Dustin Rikert
- Written by: Phil Pitzer; Dustin Rikert
- Produced by: Rick Fox; Victoria Fox; Paulino Hemmer; Bill Hutchinson; Sam McConkey; Vince Morella; Jeffery Olyan; Phil Pitzer; Dustin Rikert; Sheree J. Wilson
- Starring: Chris Engen; Sheree J. Wilson; Jeff Fahey; Michelle Borth; Rance Howard; Lauralee Bell; Michael Nouri
- Cinematography: Brian Lataille
- Edited by: Michael J. Duthie; Andrew Robertson
- Music by: Ron Fish
- Production company: Pan America Pictures
- Release date: February 25, 2012 (Bike Fest Tampa)
- Running time: 99 minutes
- Country: United States
- Language: English
- Budget: $10 million (estimated)

Easy Rider: The Ride Back is a 2012 drama film and a prequel and a sequel to the 1969 film Easy Rider. Although none of the cast or production team of the original film were involved in its production, the producers did secure the legal rights to the name. The film focuses on the history of Wyatt Williams' family and takes an unusually conservative point of view compared to the countercultural tone of the original.

== Production ==
Attempts for a sequel to Easy Rider date as far back as the 1980s when Dennis Hopper and Peter Fonda discussed a sequel called Easy Rider A.D. which would've featured Hopper and Fonda's characters brought back to life in the far future and riding across a post-apocalyptic United States but disputes between the first film's producer Bert Schneider and Columbia Pictures over the rights to Easy Rider stonewalled development until a 1992 settlement where Schneider would retain the rights to sequels and remakes while Columbia would retain other rights.

At the 1993 American Film Market, Hardy and Company, a Los Angeles-based packaging, production and distribution organization led by Sheryl Hardy had acquired the rights to Easy Rider and announced plans for an $8–10 million sequel then titled Easy Rider II In May 2000, it was reported the sequel rights had been acquired by Glen Tobias from the original film's producer Bert Schneider along with an option for two further installments with Mikki Allen Willis set to write and direct a $30 million sequel for Martin Landau's company Miracle Entertainment. By July of that year, it was reported that Miracle was fast tracking the project now titled Easy Rider A.D. with the potential for shooting in November. In September 2002, it was reported that Easy Rider A.D. had been acquired by producer Lauren Lloyd and the premise of the character of Wyatt “Captain America” Earp in prison after being falsely accused of murdering George Hanson and a new character setting out on the road to prove his innocence.

In March 2003, it was reported that the Malibu Movie Company consisting of wife and husband Conroy and Harry Kanter (son of United WestLabs President Joe Kanter) and Cincinnati based criminal defense lawyer Phil Pitzer had acquired the sequel rights to Easy Rider after prior rights holder Lauren Lloyd's attempts to make a sequel were tied up by the foreclosure of the financier Glenn Tobias. Conroy Kanter stated the intention with the sequel was to look at what freedom means in a contemporary setting. Pitzer then spent the next six years developing a follow up and wrote two scripts Easy Rider: The Ride Back and Easy Rider: The Search Continues. Dustin Rikert was hired to direct due to his reputation for being able to work quickly on shoestring budgets. In describing his intentions for the new Easy Rider film, Pitzer stated:

See, I'm a totally laissez-faire guy. I'm apolitical. Yeah, I may be a little weird. I may not be the most normal cat. But, hey, let me be. That works, you know. That's the kind of thing this movie will be about. It's about allowing people to be free and not impose your will on them. I mean, it's de Tocqueville.

== Release ==
The film had its premiere on October 1, 2009, at the Palms Casino Resort in Las Vegas, Nevada. The film then received a direct-to-video release on September 17, 2013.

== Reception ==
=== Critical reception ===
Leonard Maltin called the film a bomb, a "staggeringly bad attempt to cash in on the iconic original", and "poor on all accounts." Nathan Rabin called the film "surreally misguided" with "a strong pro-military message" and said "what The Room might be like if Wiseau decided he wasn't just going to make a tribute to A Streetcar Named Desire, but rather a sequel to A Streetcar Named Desire that casts himself as Stanley Kowalski's cooler brother Johnny, and litters the screenplay with nods to previous adventures".

Paul Mavis of DVD Talk gave the film one and a half stars saying "it stinks from the head down."

== Sequel ==
In addition to having written an additional sequel, Easy Rider: The Search Continues, Pitzer also intended to pursue an expanded Easy Rider media franchise complete with at least two more sequels, video games, merchandise, a possible television series, themed restaurants, concerts, and even a line of motorcycles.
