= Fire, Ice and Dynamite =

1990 film

- Theatrical release poster by Renato Casaro
- Directed by: Willy Bogner Jr.
- Written by: Tony Williamson
- Story by: Willy Bogner
- Produced by: Willy Bogner; Bernd Eichinger
- Starring: Roger Moore; Simon Shepherd; Geoffrey Moore; Shari Belafonte; Connie de Groot; Uwe Ochsenknecht
- Cinematography: Tomas Erhart; Charly Steinberger
- Edited by: Peter Davies
- Music by: Harold Faltermeyer
- Distributed by: Neue Constantin Film
- Release date: 18 October 1990
- Running time: 106 minutes
- Country: Germany
- Language: English
- Budget: $21.5 million DM

Fire, Ice and Dynamite (German original title Feuer, Eis und Dynamit) is a German feature-length sports film directed by Willy Bogner Jr. in 1990. It is a sequel to Fire and Ice. The screenplay was written by Tony Williamson, based on an original story by Willy Bogner.

The film features cameos from Steffi Graf, Niki Lauda, Buzz Aldrin, Dennis Conner and Isaac Hayes.

== Plot ==
The plot functions primarily as link between the stunt action scenes which mainly deal with skiing like in Fire and Ice. It also contains heavy product placement (for example, VW released a special edition of the Golf MK II named "Fire & Ice" which featured some special equipment details like the seat covers being said to be designed by Bogner himself).

Roger Moore plays an entrepreneur who is in debt with many companies. After faking his death by apparent suicide by jumping out of a plane, his children and several companies participate in several sporting events (skiing, rafting, bobsled etc.) for his $135 million estate - winner takes all. Additionally, a family of villains tries to get to the money.

== DVD release ==
Lions Gate has yet to release the film onto DVD. A PAL DVD release under the German title does exist. Prism Leisure released the film on DVD in 2002, on a 2 Disc/4 DVD disc compilation consisting of Merchant of Death, Musketeers Forever, Fire Ice & Dynamite and Paradise Lost. Payless Entertainment Limited has also released a PAL DVD under the film’s English title.

== Cast ==
- Roger Moore as Sir George Windsor/MacBain
- Simon Shepherd as Alexander
- Geoffrey Moore as Dudley Windsor
- Shari Belafonte as Serena
- Uwe Ochsenknecht as Victor, the Villain
- Connie de Groot as Lucy White
- Marjoe Gortner as Dan Selby
- Stefan Glowacz as himself
- Robby Naish as himself
- John Eaves as himself
- Jochen Schweizer as himself
- Bob Goody as Kromer
- Steven Lee as ski stunt
