= Mary-Margaret Humes =

American actress

- Occupation: Actress
- Years active: 1980–present
- Known for: Dawson's Creek; Eerie, Indiana
- Title: Miss Florida USA 1975

Mary-Margaret Humes is an American actress and beauty pageant titleholder. She won the Miss Florida USA pageant and was third runner up in the 1975 Miss USA. Humes later began working as a television actress, appearing in more than 50 shows, most notably playing Gail Leery, the title character's mother in the drama series Dawson's Creek from 1998 to 2003.

== Life and career ==
Humes won the 1975 Miss Florida USA pageant and was third runner up in the 1975 Miss USA pageant.

In 1981, Humes made her big screen debut as the Vestal Virgin Miriam in the Mel Brooks comedy film History of the World, Part I. Later Aaron Spelling cast her for the pilot for the action-adventure series Velvet alongside Leah Ayres, Shari Belafonte, and Sheree J. Wilson. During the 1980s, Humes guest-starred in a number of shows, including: The Dukes of Hazzard, The Love Boat, The A-Team, The Fall Guy, Knight Rider and T.J. Hooker. From 1991 to 1992, she played the mother of lead character in the short-lived NBC series Eerie, Indiana. She starred in the 1992 television movie Perry Mason: The Case of the Reckless Romeo, and later made appearances in: Matlock (three times in different roles), Diagnosis: Murder, In the Heat of the Night and Murphy Brown.

From 1998 to 2003, Humes starred as Gail Leery, the mother of the title character in the WB drama series Dawson's Creek. After Dawson's Creek, Humes guest-starred in a number of shows, include Grey's Anatomy, CSI: Crime Scene Investigation and Criminal Minds, and appeared in a number of Hallmark Channel television movies.

== Filmography ==
Year	Title	Role	Notes
1980	The Dukes of Hazzard	Tinker Churchill	Episode: "Mason Dixon's Girls"
1981	History of the World, Part I	Miriam	
1982	The Fall Guy	Christina Smith (other sources: Vaughn)	Episode: "The Reluctant Traveling Companion"
1982	Knight Rider	Carol Reston	Episode: "No Big Thing"
1983	The Love Boat	Cristina Stellini	Episode: "The Professor Has Class/When the Magic Disappears/We, the Jury"
1983	Manimal	Terry Sloan	Episode: "Night of the Scorpion"
1983	The A-Team	Randy Stern	Episode: "Steel"
1984	The Fall Guy	Rae Grant	Episode: "Bite of the Wasp"
1984	Riptide	Dee Dee	Episode: "The Mean Green Love Machine"
1984	Velvet	Lauren 'Boots' Daws	Television film
1984	Hunter	Sandy Newton	Episode: "Legacy"
1984	The New Mike Hammer	Dana Lord	Episode: "Bonecrunch"
1985	Hardcastle and McCormick	Pamela Bayer	Episode: "What's So Funny?"
1985	The Fall Guy	Serena	Episode: "Split Image"
1985	Half Nelson	April	Episode: "Nose Job"
1985	Night Court	Kimberley Daniels	Episode: "Halloween, Too"
1985	Shadow Chasers	Allison Collingswood	Episode: "Blood and Magnolias"
1985	T.J. Hooker	Chrissi Wilde	Episode: "Hollywood Starr"
1986	T.J. Hooker	Lisa Temple	Episode: "Deadly Force"
1986	Gung Ho	Melissa	Episode: "Line of Credit"
1987	Outlaws	Lora Kirby	Episode: "Primer"
1988	A Year in the Life	Kathleen	Episode: "Goodbye to All That"
1989	Making a Living		Episode: "Daddy's Little Girl"
1990	Jake and the Fatman	Tish; Janet Fromer	Episode: "I Ain't Got Nobody"; Episode: "My Boy Bill"
1990	The Hogan Family	Honey	Episode: "Come Fly with Me"
1990	Matlock	Brigette Laird	Episode: "The Personal Trainer"
1991	Matlock	Claudette Hertz	Episode: "The Marriage Counselor"
1991	Father Dowling Mysteries	Mrs. Wiley	Episode: "The Monkey Business Mystery"
1991–1992	Eerie, Indiana	Marilyn Teller	19 episodes
1992	Matlock	Candace Winfield	Episode: "The Legacy"
1992	Perry Mason: The Case of the Reckless Romeo	Laura Rand	Television film
1992	Bodies of Evidence	Andie Harper	Episode: "Nearest and Dearest"
1993	Blossom	Carol	Episode: "Time"; Episode: "Hunger"
1993	Dark Justice	Glenda Ross	Episode: "The Greening of Glenda Ross"
1993	Time Trax	Tulsa Giles	Episode: "Framed"
1994	Time Trax	Tulsa Giles	Episode: "Happy Valley"
1994	Diagnosis Murder	Ruth Garfield	Episode: "Shaker"
1995	Renegade	Laura Tracy	Episode: "Ace in the Hole"
1995	In the Heat of the Night: By Duty Bound	Karen	
1995	Gramps	Betsy MacGruder	Television film
1995	Legend	Laura Davenport	Episode: "Knee-High Noon"
1995	Land's End	Rebecca/Simone	3 episodes
1995	Pointman	Marge	Episode: "Going Home"
1996	Sworn to Justice	Megan	
1997	Murphy Brown	Raven-Haired Receptionist	Episode: "Who Do You Truss?"; Episode: "Blind Date"
1997	Moloney		Episode: "The Ripple Effect"
1998–2003	Dawson's Creek	Gail Leery	93 episodes
2000	The Stalking of Laurie Show	Hazel Show	Television film
2001	Motocrossed	Geneva Carson	Television film
2001	Dying to Dance	Helene Lennox	Television film
2002	Touched by an Angel	Sandy Collette	Episode: "A Rock and a Hard Place"
2002	CSI: Crime Scene Investigation	Jeri Newman	Episode: "Let the Seller Beware"
2004	The Division	Mrs. Newland	Episode: "Hail, Hail, the Gang's All Here"
2005	CSI: NY	Helen Sanders	Episode: "Oedipus Hex"
2006	Grey's Anatomy	Nancy Jennings	Episode: "Desire"
2007	My First Christmas Tree	Mom	Short film
2007	Ghost Whisperer	Susan Drake	Episode: "Unhappy Medium"
2008	Criminal Minds	Audrey Henson	Episode: "The Crossing"
2008	Broken Windows	Dori	
2009	Saving Grace	Deanne Wells	Episode: "Have a Seat, Earl"
2010	Head Over Spurs in Love	Lorraine Walker	
2010	The Portal	Mary	
2010	The Republic	Bettie Thompson	Television film
2010	Dad's Home	Mrs. Dougherty	Television film
2011	The Protector	Jessica Moore	Episode: "Bangs"
2012	Luck	Lynette	Episode: "Ace Meets with a Potential Investor"
2012	Matchmaker Santa	Katherine	Television film
2013	Beverly Hills Cop	Gina Nickles	TV pilot
2014	The Girl He Met Online	Agatha Casey	Television film
2015	Fire City: End of Days	Human Cornelia	
2015	Chasing Eagle Rock	Mags Avery	
2017	Christmas Eve	Maggie DeJesus	
2018	Home by Spring	Susan	Television film
2018	Christmas in Love	Grace Hartman	Television film
2019	Winter Love Story	Jeannine Jordan	Television film
2019	A Feeling of Home	Constance	Television film
2020	A Valentine's Match	Alicia Simmons	Television film
2022	Two Tickets to Paradise	Alice	Television film

Preceded by Cynthia Zach	Miss Florida USA; 1975	Succeeded by Leigh Walsh
