= Walker, Texas Ranger: Trial by Fire =

2005 television film directed by Aaron Norris

- DVD cover
- Genre: Action
- Created by: Albert S. Ruddy; Leslie Greif; Paul Haggis; Christopher Canaan
- Written by: John Lansing; Bruce Cervi
- Directed by: Aaron Norris
- Starring: Chuck Norris; Sheree J. Wilson; Judson Mills; Andre Kristoff; Bret Loehr; Steven Williams; Bruce Locke; Janine Turner; Clarence Gilyard; Ned Vaughn; Mitchel Musso
- Music by: Kevin Kiner
- Country of origin: United States
- Original language: English

Production
- Executive producers: Chuck Norris; Aaron Norris; Leslie Greif
- Producer: Rick Tucker
- Cinematography: Fernando Argüelles
- Editor: Michael J. Duthie
- Running time: 120 minutes
- Production companies: Norris Brothers Entertainment; The Greif Company; Paramount Television

Original release
- Network: CBS
- Release: October 16, 2005

Walker, Texas Ranger: Trial by Fire is a 2005 American action television film directed by Aaron Norris and based on the popular 1993–2001 television series Walker, Texas Ranger starring Chuck Norris, Sheree J. Wilson, Judson Mills, Andre Kristoff, Janine Turner and Steven Williams. The film was produced by Norris Brothers Entertainment, The Greif Company and Paramount Television and premiered on CBS on October 16, 2005.

== Plot ==
Texas Rangers Cordell Walker, Francis Gage, and Rhett Harper foil a bank robbery, killing two robbers while their leader escapes. Meanwhile, three North Korean agents murder Adam Hopkins, a developer of a missile guidance system, but his thirteen-year-old son Jeremy escapes with the device. With Jimmy Trivette away on vacation, Gage and new Ranger Kay Austin investigate the murder. Harper is implicated in the murder of a woman he met at a bar, while Assistant District Attorneys Alex Cahill and Garrett Evans investigate the case.

Jeremy takes refuge with his friend Josh Withley but is pursued by the North Koreans. He contacts his father's employer for help, unaware that the man is working with them. Meanwhile, Harper is implicated in a second murder when a convicted child rapist he once arrested is found dead. Charged with both murders, Harper is held without bail. Austin discovers evidence exonerating him, but an assailant steals her forensic kit.

Walker kills one of the North Koreans, while Gage and Austin discover that blood found at the second murder scene was planted. They trace it to a man who recently assaulted Harper and, through him, apprehend the thief who stole Austin's evidence. Meanwhile, Jeremy's father's employer delivers the boy to the remaining North Koreans, who murder their accomplice. Walker, Gage, and Austin arrive and kill the agents, rescuing Jeremy, who is sent to live with his aunt in California.

At Harper's trial, Walker reveals that the arrested men have implicated Evans in both murders. Evans seizes a bailiff's gun and takes a hostage, but Walker disarms him and Harper subdues him. Evans reveals that he framed Harper to avenge his sister Charlene, who committed suicide after Harper rejected her romantic advances. Evans arranged the first murder and planted evidence against Harper, then committed the second murder and hired an accomplice to steal the evidence of Harper's innocence.

With Harper exonerated, the Rangers prepare to address the press outside the courthouse. The surviving bank robber suddenly appears and opens fire, but Harper, Gage, and Austin kill him. Alex then discovers she has been shot in the chest and collapses unconscious.

== Cast ==
- Chuck Norris as Captain Ranger Cordell Walker
- Sheree J. Wilson as Alex Cahill
- Judson Mills as Ranger Francis Gage
- Andre Kristoff as Ranger Rhett Harper
- Janine Turner as Ranger Kay Austin
- Steven Williams as Mike Burton
- Bret Loehr as Jeremy Hopkins
- Bruce Locke as "Blue Eye"
- Mitchel Musso as Josh Withley
- Ned Vaughn as Garret Evans
- Danilee Kelly Norris as Angela Walker
- Darryl Cox as Aaron Gordon
- Glenn Morshower as Reed Larkin
- Maggie Myatt as Dee Dee Michaels
- Timothy Vahle as Adam Hopkins
- Derek Southers as Clete Tyson
- Selena Gomez as Julie
- Clarence Gilyard as Ranger James Trivette
- Charles Baker as Herman Van Horne

== Production ==
The American channel CBS in 2005 decided to produce a TV movie based on the popular TV series starring Chuck Norris which aired October 16, 2005. Chuck Norris, Sheree J. Wilson and Judson Mills reprise their television roles. Clarence Gilyard could not participate in the main filming due to a family vacation, and instead made an uncredited cameo appearance. Judson Mills (who was not originally planned in the script) was invited to reprise his role of Francis Gage. Nia Peeples, who played Sydney Cooke, was excluded from the screenplay. This was the first film appearance for Clarence Gilyard after his retirement in 2002 following Left Behind II: Tribulation Force.

The film is independent of the events of the show. Set four years after the last television episode, the story is completely new to try to give the film a fresh tone.

On October 17, 2005, the film was awarded Best Film of the Week on Saturday night. Chuck Norris stated that more Walker, Texas Ranger television films were expected. Trial by Fire was to be the first in a series of television films dedicated to the character of Walker, intended for broadcast on Saturday night. Based on the low ratings, however, CBS decided to shelve the idea, while leaving open the possibility of future direct DVD releases.
