= Sheree J. Wilson =

American actress

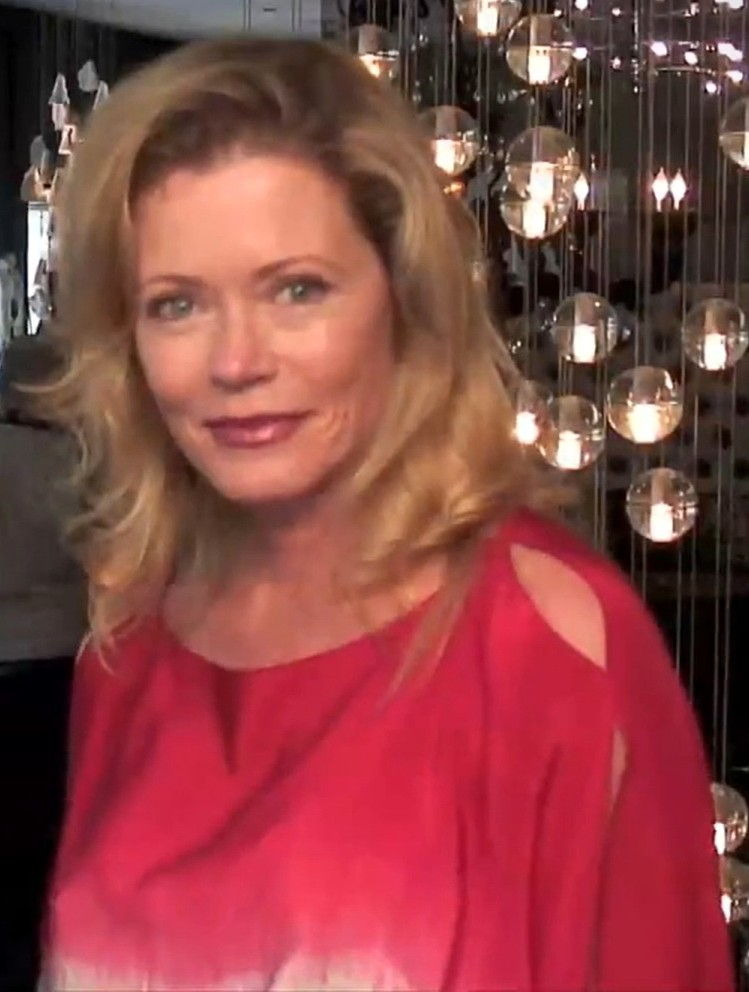
- Wilson in 2009
- Born: December 12, 1958 (age 67); Rochester, Minnesota, U.S.
- Education: Fairview High School
- Alma mater: University of Colorado Boulder
- Occupation: Actress
- Years active: 1984–present
- Spouses: Paul DeRobbio (m. 1991; div. 2004); Vince Morella (m. 2018)
- Children: 2
- Website: www.shereejwilson.com

Sheree J. Wilson (born December 12, 1958) is an American actress, producer, businesswoman, and model. She is best known for her roles as April Stevens Ewing on the American primetime television series Dallas (1986–1991) and as Alex Cahill-Walker on the television series Walker, Texas Ranger (1993–2001).

== Early life ==
Wilson was born in Rochester, Minnesota on December 12, 1958. The daughter of two IBM executives, Wilson moved to Colorado at the age of nine and graduated from Fairview High School. In 1981, she received a degree in fashion merchandising and business from the University of Colorado Boulder.

== Career ==
While working in Denver on a fashion shoot, one of the photographers mistook Wilson for a model and then introduced her to a New York modeling agent who signed her on the spot. Wilson then moved to Manhattan, and within 18 months, she had appeared in over 30 commercial campaigns for Clairol, Sea Breeze, Keri-Lotion, and Maybelline. Her print work ran in such popular magazines as Mademoiselle, Glamour, and Redbook.

After three years of modeling, Wilson moved to Los Angeles for a career in acting. Her first roles included the black comedy film Crimewave (1985) directed by Sam Raimi, Velvet (1984), an ABC/Aaron Spelling television movie opposite Leah Ayres, Shari Belafonte, and Mary Margaret Humes, and a guest role on the espionage series Cover Up (1984). She had a lead role with Tim Robbins in the comedy motion picture Fraternity Vacation (1985) and also appeared in a CBS television miniseries Kane & Abel (1985) with Peter Strauss. This immediately led to Our Family Honor (1985–1986), an ABC drama about Irish cops versus the Mafia, in which she co-starred with Ray Liotta, Michael Madsen, and Eli Wallach. Her career continued to flourish with a role in the television movie News at Eleven (1986) alongside Martin Sheen.

Wilson gained the role as April Stevens Ewing on the CBS soap opera Dallas (1986–1991). Her character was gunned down in the final season during her honeymoon (with new husband Bobby Ewing) in Paris. She continued to make some appearances in Bobby's dream sequences later that season. In reality, Wilson was killed off and left the series due to maternity. Her performance earned her the Soap Opera Digest Award for Best Death Scene in 1991, as well as four other nominations. In 2006, she attended the TV Land Award ceremony for Dallas and in November 2008, the Dallas 30th anniversary reunion party at Southfork Ranch in Parker, Texas, with cast members Larry Hagman, Patrick Duffy, Linda Gray, Ken Kercheval, Steve Kanaly, and Charlene Tilton.

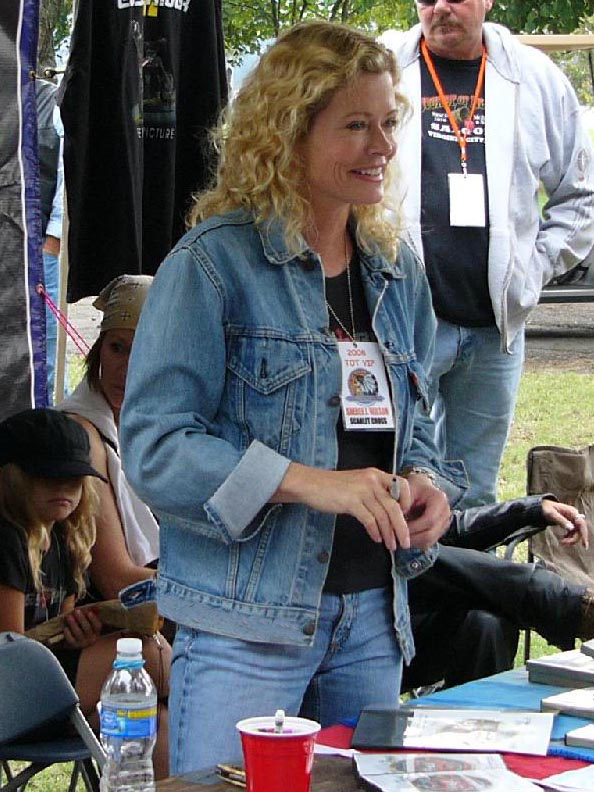
Wilson on the 2008 Trail of Tears Memorial Ride

In 1993, following guest roles in the television series Matlock (opposite Clarence Gilyard's former acting mentor, Andy Griffith), Burke's Law, and Renegade (opposite Lorenzo Lamas), Wilson played the lead female role in Hellbound opposite Chuck Norris, which led to her best-known role as Alexandra "Alex" Cahill-Walker also opposite Norris in Walker, Texas Ranger (1993–2001). In 2005, she reprised her role in the television movie Walker, Texas Ranger: Trial by Fire which ended with her character being the victim of a courthouse shooting. This left many viewers to believe that there would be a follow-up movie which was severely impaired when CBS said that they would no longer be producing "Sunday Night Movie of the Week" projects. She also co-starred in the Showtime movie Past Tense (1994).

In 2006, Wilson appeared in Fragile, the first short film by documentary filmmaker Fredric Lean. She played the lead role in television movies Mystery Woman: Game Time (2005) and Anna's Storm (2007). She produced and starred in independent films Killing Down (2006), The Gundown (2011), Easy Rider: The Ride Back (2012), and Dug Up (2013). She co-starred in the television series Pink (2007–2008) and had a guest role in the television series DeVanity (2014). She played a major role in the television movie Christmas Belle (2013), A Mermaid for Christmas (2019), and The Silent Natural (2019).

Wilson performed in the role of Miss Daisy Werthan in the Neil Simon Film Festival's Driving Miss Daisy (2016–2022) opposite her former Walker, Texas Ranger co-star, Clarence Gilyard.

== Personal life ==
Wilson married Vince Morella in 2018 and currently resides in Dallas, Texas. She has two sons from a previous marriage (1991-2004) to Paul DeRobbio.

Wilson has been active in the National Multiple Sclerosis Society, Trail of Tears Remembrance Motorcycle Ride, Wings for Life aimed at healing spinal cord injuries, and White Bridle Humane Society, a horse rescue equine therapy nonprofit organization for children with developmental disabilities located in Texas. Wilson also created a line of beauty therapy skin care products.

== Filmography ==
=== Film ===
Year	Title	Role	Notes
1984	Velvet	Ellen Stockwell	Television film
1985	Crimewave	Nancy	
1985	Fraternity Vacation	Ashley Taylor	
1986	News at Eleven	Christine Arnold	Television film
1994	Past Tense	Emily Talbert	Television film
1994	Walker Texas Ranger 3: Deadly Reunion	Alex Cahill	
1994	Hellbound	Leslie	
2003	Midnight Expression	Mary Drake	Short film
2004	Birdie and Bogey	Shelia	
2005	Mystery Woman: Game Time	Jody Fiske	Television film
2005	Walker, Texas Ranger: Trial by Fire	Alex Cahill-Walker	Television film
2006	Killing Down	Rachel	
2006	Fragile	Sophie	Short film
2007	Anna's Storm	Mayor Anna Davenport-Baxter	Television film
2011	The Gundown	Sarah Morgan	Also producer
2012	Dug Up	Mona Walker	Also producer
2013	A Country Christmas	Bonnie Branson	
2013	Easy Rider: The Ride Back	Shane Williams	Also producer
2013	Christmas Belle	Angie	
2014	Jail Wagon	Martha	Also producer
2019	The Silent Natural	Rebecca Hoy	
2019	A Mermaid for Christmas	Theodora	Television film
2020	Flip Turn	Grandma	

=== Television ===
Year	Title	Role	Notes
1984	Cover Up	Rachel	Episode: "Death in Vogue"
1985–1986	Our Family Honor	Rita Danzig	Series regular, 13 episodes
1985	Kane & Abel	Melanie LeRoy	Mini-Series
1986–1991	Dallas	April Stevens Ewing	Series regular, 112 episodes TV Land Pop Culture Award (2006); Soap Opera Digest Award for Best Death Scene (1991); Nominated — Soap Opera Digest Award for Outstanding Villainess: Prime Time (1988); Nominated — Soap Opera Digest Award for Outstanding Actress in a Supporting Role: Prime Time (1989); Nominated — Soap Opera Digest Award for Outstanding Lead Actress: Prime Time (1990); Nominated — Soap Opera Digest Award for Outstanding Heroine: Prime Time (1991)
1991	Matlock	Claire Mayfield	Episode: "The Dame"
1992	Renegade	Lisa Stone	Episode: "Final Judgement"
1993–2001	Walker, Texas Ranger	Alex Cahill	Series regular, 196 episodes
1995	Burke's Law	Jensen Farnsworth	Episode: "Who Killed the King of the Country Club?"
1999	Sons of Thunder	Alex Cahill	2 episodes
2005	Walker, Texas Ranger: Trial by Fire	Alex Cahill	TV movie
2014	DeVanity	Claudia Muller	Episode: "Death Becomes Him Part I"

=== Stage ===
Year	Title	Role	Notes
2016-2022	Driving Miss Daisy	Miss Daisy Werthan	

=== Attraction ===
Year	Title	Role	Notes
1986–2008	King Kong Encounter	Kelly King	
