= Scott Rubenstein =

American television writer (1947–2019)

- Born: Scott Ian Rubenstein; September 28, 1947; Brooklyn, New York, U.S.
- Died: July 25, 2019 (aged 71); West Hollywood, California, U.S.
- Occupations: Television writer, Enrolled Agent (E.A.)
- Spouse: Dorothy Rubenstein (Simoni) (married 1970- 1990) Devorah Cutler-Rubenstein (married 1994 - 2019)
- Children: 2, Sara Rubenstein

Scott Ian Rubenstein (September 28, 1947 - July 25, 2019) was an American television writer and story editor best known for the latter in Star Trek: The Next Generation. He also wrote the TNG episode "The Dauphin". Some of Rubenstein's other television writing credits included 9 to 5, Diff'rent Strokes, Night Court, Cagney & Lacey, Benson, MacGyver, It's Garry Shandling's Show, Born Free, and What's Happening Now!!.

== Career ==
Scott Rubenstein was also co-owner of L.A. Tax Service (started in 1982) and worked as an Accountant (Enrolled Agent) and writer. He won Funniest Account in Los Angeles in the 1990s. Before his writing career began, Scott was a teacher in the Peace Corps, stationed in the Philippines. After returning home, he taught in Sacramento at Christian Brothers and he entered and won a writing contest through 20th Century Fox, which brought him to Los Angeles where he joined as a member of 20th century Fox's Comedy writing workshop. There be began his writing career and has written over 30 episodes of television. Scott co-wrote many episodes with this writing partner, Leonard Mlodinow. Early in Scott's writing career he partnered with writer Debra Frank [https://www.imdb.com/name/nm0290900/] . Scott co-wrote Peacock Blues with wife and director Devo Cutler-Rubenstein for Showtime and it won best Short Film at Moondance Film Festival. He also co-wrote the award winning documentary Not Afraid to Laugh. Scott has worked as an adjunct professor and taught Screen Writing, Comedy Writing and Screen Writing Adaptations in multiple settings, including at the California State University Northridge and University of Southern California. Scott and L.A. Tax Service was featured on Jon Stewart's The Daily Show in a segment called Hustle and Cash Flow and he played a small part on an episode of the New Girl as Mr. Scott Rubenstein. He was also a part of Improv workshops with Aretha Sills, the granddaughter of Viola Spolin. Scott was born in New York, New York to Jewish Parents. His father was a prisoner of war in World War II and held captive by the Japanese. His father was held as a prisoner in the Philippines and survived the Bataan Death March and the Hell Ships. His mother was a writer and bookkeeper. Scott has been best friends with Actor Sal Viscuso since they met while attending the University of California Davis (Scott graduated in 1969). He is survived by daughter Artist and Mental Health Therapist Sara Rubenstein Gavin and son Aaron Rubenstein, Enrolled Agent and co-owner of LA Tax Service.

== Filmography ==
- Peacock Blues (TV Short) 1990
- The New Adam-12 (TV Series) (writer)
- The Landlord (1990) (writer) 1990
- Night Court (TV Series) (writer)
- Futureman (1990) (writer) 1989
- Hunter (TV Series) (writer)
- Shield of Honor (1989) (writer)
- Star Trek: The Next Generation (TV Series) (story editor - 9 episodes, 1988 - 1989) (writer, 1989)
- The Royale (1989, story editor)
- Contagion (1989, story editor)
- The Dauphin (1989, (written and sort editor)
- The Measure of a Man (1989, story editor)
- A Matter of Honor (1989, story editor) Show all 9 episodes 1987
- MacGyver (TV Series) (written by - 1 episode)
- Hell Week (1987) 1987
- What's Happening Now! (TV Series) (1 episode)
- Raj on the Double (1987) 1982-1986
- Nine to Five (TV Series) (written by - 2 episodes)
- The Russians Are Coming (1986)
- The China Sin-Drome (1982) 1985
- Cagney & Lacey (TV Series) (written by - 2 episodes)
- The Psychic (1985) - Stress (1985) 1984
- Benson (TV Series) (written by - 1 episode)
- Embarrassing Moments (1984)
- Diff'rent Strokes (TV Series) (written by - 2 episodes, 1981 - 1982) (story by - 1 episode, 1980) (teleplay by - 1 episode, 1980)
- The Older Woman (1982)
- Growing Up (1981)
- Substitute Mother (1980)
