= 9 to 5 (TV series) =

American television sitcom

- Genre: Sitcom
- Created by: Micheal S. Baser; Kim Weiskopf
- Starring: Rita Moreno; Rachel Dennison; Valerie Curtin; Leah Ayres; Sally Struthers; Jeffrey Tambor; Peter Bonerz; Edward Winter; Jean Marsh
- Theme music composer: Dolly Parton
- Opening theme: "9 to 5"
- Composers: Jack Elliott; Dan Foliart; Jimmie Haskell; Howard Pearl
- Country of origin: United States
- Original language: English
- No. of seasons: 5
- No. of episodes: 85 (2 unaired) (list of episodes)

Production
- Executive producers: Jane Fonda (1982–83); Bruce Gilbert (1982–83); James Komack (1983); Michael J. Kagan (1986-88)
- Producers: Andrew Guerdat (1986–88); Steve Kreinberg (1986–88); Jan Siegelman (1986–88)
- Camera setup: Multi-camera
- Running time: 30 minutes
- Production companies: IPC Films; 20th Century Fox Television

Original release
- Network: ABC
- Release: March 25, 1982 – October 27, 1983
- Network: Syndication
- Release: September 13, 1986 – March 26, 1988

9 to 5 is an American television sitcom based on the 1980 film with the same name that aired on ABC from March 25, 1982, to October 27, 1983, and in first-run syndication from September 13, 1986, to March 26, 1988.

9 to 5 features Rachel Dennison, Dolly Parton's younger sister, in Parton's role of Doralee Rhodes; Rita Moreno portrayed the role of Violet Newstead (as played originally by Lily Tomlin); and Valerie Curtin took over the role of Judy Bernly (as played by Jane Fonda). In the truncated third season, Curtin's Judy Bernly was replaced with Leah Ayres as secretary Linda Bowman. In the second version of the show, Sally Struthers replaced Moreno, and Curtin returned as Judy. A total of 85 episodes were filmed. The first season was on film in front of a studio audience but switched to videotape for the next season. While the first two seasons had the same opening clips, the remaining three seasons had noticeable differences between them.

== ABC run ==
=== Seasons 1–2 ===
The first two seasons' opening credits featured clips from the 1980 movie trailer, of various office duties being performed.

Cast changes were constant early on, as the show tried to find the right ensemble combination. Jeffrey Tambor was the original Franklin Hart (Dabney Coleman's character from the film) during the spring 1982 run, but that fall Peter Bonerz replaced him in that role. He would remain throughout the rest of 9 to 5's ABC run. In another key element straight from the movie, resident flunky to Mr. Hart, office snoop Roz Keith (portrayed in the original film by Elizabeth Wilson), was played by British actress Jean Marsh (of Upstairs, Downstairs fame). Roz was responsible for digging up the personal dirt on the secretaries and to help Hart scheme his way to the very top.

Season 2 also saw the addition of Herb Edelman as fatherly salesman Harry Nussbaum, who became an ally to Violet, Judy and Doralee in their schemes against Mr. Hart. Another co-worker, Clair (Ann Weldon), became a regular. The sitcom proved to be very popular, ranking at #15 for its first season due to its strong Tuesday 9:30 time slot.

=== Season 3 ===
Jane Fonda, who also developed the film version, acted as executive producer during the show's first two seasons. However, she disassociated herself after a dispute over the direction of the show. Her co-producer Bruce Gilbert went with her. Prior to the start of Season 3, veteran TV actor and producer James Komack stepped in to helm the show in their stead. His vision for the show included many changes, which tried to add a new angle without taking the premise away from the original movie and TV format.

The Fonda character of Judy Bernly, portrayed by Valerie Curtin, was written out for the purposes of replacing her with a younger, 20-something secretary, Linda Bowman (Leah Ayres). She instantly became friends with Violet and Doralee, so much that she subsequently became a roommate of theirs in Violet's apartment. Also inhabiting this living arrangement was Violet's 12-year-old son Tommy (played by Tony La Torre, in between his stints on CBS' oft-cancelled Cagney & Lacey). Salesman Nussbaum was also replaced, by Michael Henderson (George Deloy), and Komack also dropped office snoop Roz. Additionally, the company setting changed from Consolidated Companies to American House.

The revamp and new Thursday time slot caused an instant decline in the ratings, falling to 75th out of 76 shows, and the series was cancelled five episodes into the new season. As ABC decided to pull the plug on 9 to 5 just a month into the season, only five episodes were broadcast in the 1983–84 season, with two episodes remaining unaired.

== First-run syndication ==
New episodes of 9 to 5 surfaced in first-run syndication in Fall 1986. Valerie Curtin was back as Judy Bernly as was Rachel Dennison. Assuming the starring role, in place of the unavailable Rita Moreno, was Sally Struthers as slightly naive single mother Marsha McMurray Shrimpton, who added fresh perspective to the group. For the second time in the TV series, the company that the lead characters worked for changed again, this time to Barkley Foods International.

In the syndicated version, Franklin Hart was no longer the girls' supervisor. During this version, the girls' superiors were ladies' man Russ Merman (Peter Evans), Bud Coleman (Edward Winter), and Marsha's boss in the 1986-87 season, Sharmin Cunningham (Dorian Lopinto). The following season, Vice President of Sales E. Nelson Felb (Fred Applegate) became Marsha's boss. Also featured were James (James Martinez), the maintenance man of the Barkley Foods building, and Morgan (Art Evans), the Jamaican-accented mailroom clerk who added to the office camaraderie.

The syndication arm of 20th Century Fox Television sold the series to stations across the United States, including those owned by then-corporate sibling Fox Television Stations. 9 to 5 also aired on WTBS in Atlanta, whose then-status as a cable superstation made the series available to a national audience.

== Episodes ==
Season	Episodes	Originally released			Nielsen Rank	Nielsen Rating
Season	Episodes	First released	Last released	Network	Nielsen Rank	Nielsen Rating
1	4	March 25, 1982	April 15, 1982	ABC	33	TBA
2	22	September 28, 1982	May 10, 1983	ABC	15	19.3 (Note: Tied with The Mississippi)
3	7	September 29, 1983	October 27, 1983	ABC	84	11.4
4	26	September 13, 1986	March 28, 1987	Syndication	TBA	TBA
5	26	September 13, 1987	March 26, 1988	Syndication	TBA	TBA

== Cast ==
=== Main characters ===
- Rita Moreno as Violet Newstead (season 1–3), replacing Lily Tomlin from the original film
- Valerie Curtin as Judy Bernly (season 1–2, 4–5), replacing Jane Fonda from the original film
- Rachel Dennison as Doralee Rhodes Brooks, replacing Dolly Parton from the original film
- Jean Marsh as Roz Keith (season 1–2), replacing Elizabeth Wilson from the original film
- Jeffrey Tambor (season 1) and Peter Bonerz (seasons 2–3) as Franklin Hart, their boss, replacing Dabney Coleman from the original film
- Leah Ayres as Linda Bowman (season 3), secretary, replacing Valerie Curtin's role in the show
- George Deloy as Michael Henderson (season 3), salesman, replacing recurring guest star Herb Edelman's role in the show
- Tony La Torre as Tommy Newstead (season 3), Violet's son
- Sally Struthers as Marsha McMurray Shrimpton (seasons 4–5), replacing Rita Moreno's role in the show
- Peter Evans as Russ Merman (seasons 4–5), co-worker
- Art Evans as Morgan (seasons 4–5), mailroom clerk
- James Martinez as James (seasons 4–5), maintenance man
- Ed Winter as William "Bud" Coleman (seasons 4–5), co-worker
- Dorian Lopinto as Charmin Cunningham (season 4), the boss, replacing Peter Bonerz' role in the show
- Fred Applegate as E. Nelson Felb (season 5), the boss, replacing Dorian Lopinto's role in the show

=== Recurring characters ===
- Herb Edelman as Harry Nussbaum (season 2)
- Ann Weldon as Clair (seasons 2–3)

== Theme music ==
The hit title song from the movie, "9 to 5", written and performed by Dolly Parton, was used as the theme song for the TV series. However, during the first season run in spring 1982, Phoebe Snow performed the vocals. Starting with Season 2 and through the end of the show's syndication run in 1988, Parton's vocals were featured in the theme.

== Differences between the film and TV series ==
Several other plot changes were present in the TV series that were not featured in the film. For instance, the film shows aspects of Violet's life as a widow supporting four children, the most visible of whom is Tommy. While this carried over to the television series, only her son Josh was featured. Also, due to the casting of Rita Moreno, Violet's maiden name was changed to Fernandez in the television series, and her characterization was changed to a fiery Latina woman. While the film portrayed Franklin Hart as a womanizing, despotic tyrant, he is instead portrayed as bumbling and incompetent in the television series. In the film, Doralee's husband's name was Duane, while in the television version, the character was initially single, and, in later seasons, married a man named Curtis.
