= Mark Phelan =

Irish hurler

Personal information
- Native name: Marcus Ó Faoláin (Irish)
- Born: 1982 (age 43–44) Ballyfacey, County Kilkenny, Ireland
- Height: 5 ft 11 in (180 cm)

Sport
- Sport: Hurling
- Position: Right corner-back
Club
- Years: Club
- 1999-present: Glenmore
Club titles
- Kilkenny titles: 2
Inter-county
Years	County	Apps (scores)
2004-2005	Kilkenny	1 (0-00)
Inter-county titles
- Leinster titles: 1
- All-Irelands: 0
- NHL: 1
- All Stars: 0

Mark Phelan (born 1982) is an Irish hurler who played as a right corner-back for the Kilkenny senior team.

Phelan joined the team during the 2004 Walsh Cup and was a regular member of the team for two seasons. During that time he failed to win any honours at senior level. He has won two All-Ireland and 3 Leinster winners' medals in the intermediate grade.

At club level Phelan is a one-time county club championship medalist with Glenmore.
