= Leah Ayres =

American actress

Leah Ayres Kalish
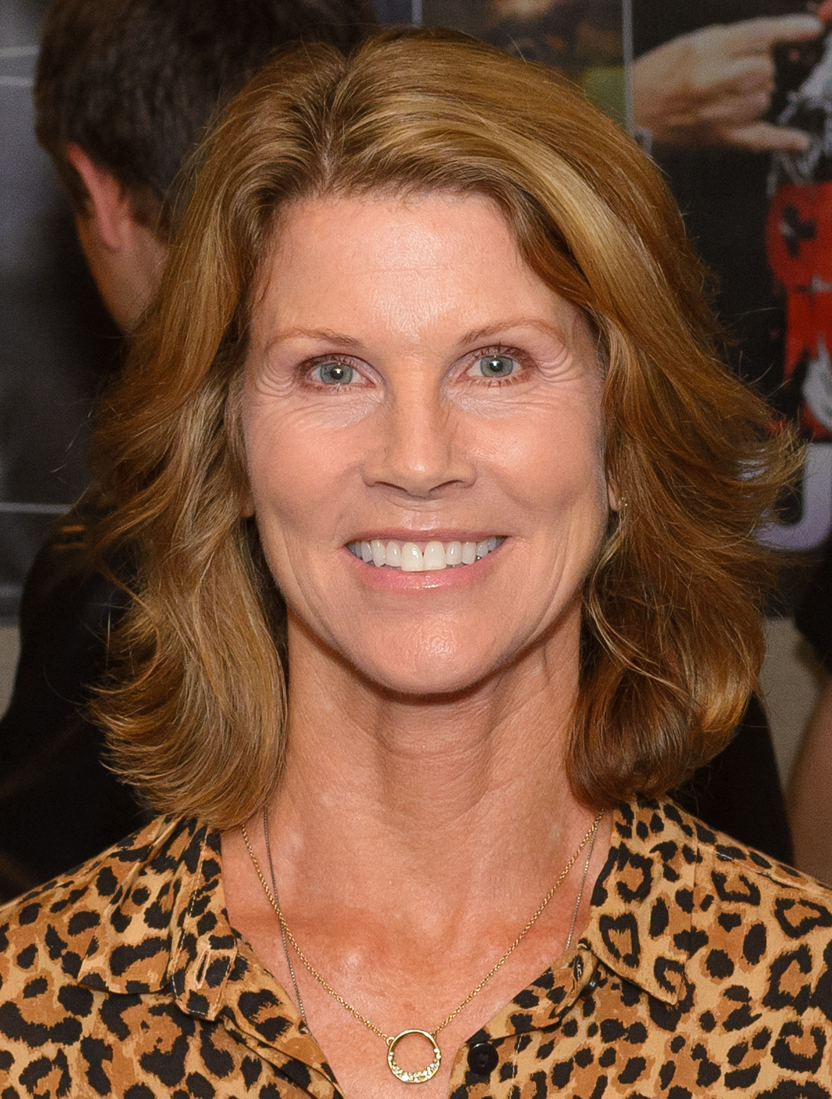
- Kalish in 2017
- Born: Leah Simpson; May 29, 1957 (age 69)
- Education: Tufts University; New York University (BA); Pacific Oaks College (MA)
- Occupation: Actress
- Years active: 1979–1998
- Known for: The Bradys; The Edge of Night; Bloodsport
- Spouse: Bruce Kalish (m. 1990)
- Children: 1
- Website: leahkalish.com

Leah Ayres Kalish (born Leah Simpson; May 29, 1957) is an American former actress, best known for her role as Janice Kent in the martial arts sports action film Bloodsport and as Valerie Bryson on the daytime serial The Edge of Night. Kalish is a master yoga teacher, Family Constellations practitioner, and coauthor of children's books.

== Education ==
Kalish attended both Tufts University and New York University (NYU), earning a degree in dance from NYU. Ayres also earned an MA in human development from Pacific Oaks College in Pasadena, California in 1996.

== Certifications ==
Kalish is a certified Family Constellations facilitator, embodied language processing (embodiment process) practitioner, and Yoga Alliance registered master yoga teacher. She is a proponent of socio-emotional education and teaching integrated yoga and mindfulness in schools. She and her husband Bruce Kalish are founders of a family constellations and inherited family trauma facilitation practice based in Los Angeles.

== Television ==
Her first major role was as Valerie Bryson on the daytime serial The Edge of Night in the early 1980s. In 1984, she starred in Velvet, an ABC/Aaron Spelling television movie opposite Sheree J. Wilson, Shari Belafonte, and Mary Margaret Humes. In primetime, she co-starred as Linda Bowman on the abbreviated third season of ABC's 9 to 5. She also played Jill Schrader on the HBO original comedy 1st & Ten in 1986-87.

In 1990, she replaced Maureen McCormick in the role of Marcia Brady on the short-lived series The Bradys. She also made guest appearances on such series as Hotel, The Love Boat, Fantasy Island, Married... with Children, and Who's the Boss?. In 1995, she had a recurring role as Tara Flynn on three episodes of Walker, Texas Ranger.

== Film ==
Ayres starred in Bloodsport (1988) alongside Jean-Claude Van Damme and played Michelle in the 1981 film The Burning. She appeared in Eddie Macon's Run (1983) and portrayed the diner waitress in the Meat Loaf music video for "More Than You Deserve".

== Filmography ==
Film and television
| Year | Title | Role | Notes |
|---|---|---|---|
| 1979 | Love of Life | Christy Bringham | Daytime drama |
| 1979 | Mother and Me, M.D. | Barrie Tucker | Television pilot episode |
| 1979 | All That Jazz | Nurse Capobianco | Feature film |
| 1981 | The Burning | Michelle | Feature film |
| 1981 | Meat Loaf: More Than You Deserve | Waitress | Music video |
| 1981–1983 | The Edge of Night | Valerie Bryson | Daytime drama |
| 1982 | Dead Ringer | Waitress | Feature film |
| 1983 | 9 to 5 | Linda Bowman | Main role (7 episodes) |
| 1983 | Eddie Macon's Run | Chris Macon | Feature film |
| 1983 | Nine to Five | Linda Bowman | Recurring role (7 episodes) |
| 1984 | Fantasy Island | Lauren Spenser | Episode: "Sing Melancholy Baby/The Last Dogfight" |
| 1984 | Velvet | Cass Dayton | Television film |
| 1984 | The A-Team | Jenny Olsen | Episode: "Double Heat" |
| 1984 | The Love Boat | Nancy Sidon | Episode: "The Buck Stops Here / For Bettor or Worse / Bet on It" |
| 1984 | The Love Boat | Arlene Cort | Episode: "Country Blues / A Matter of Taste / Frat Brothers Forever" |
| 1985 | Dreams | Kim | Episode: |
| 1985 | Finder of Lost Loves | Stacey Barnes | Episode: "Deadly Silence" |
| 1985 | Hotel | Jill | Episode: "Identities" |
| 1985 | Crazy Like a Fox | Elaine Mulligan | Episode: "If the Shoe Fits" |
| 1985–1986 | St. Elsewhere | Mona Polito | Recurring role (5 episodes) |
| 1986 | We're Puttin' on the Ritz | Micki Cline | Television film |
| 1986 | Too Close for Comfort | Jennifer | Episode: "Ya Gotta Have Heart" |
| 1987 | 1st & Ten | Jill Schrader | Main role (11 episodes) |
| 1987 | 21 Jump Street | Susan Chadwick | Episode: "Don't Pet the Teacher" |
| 1987 | The Oldest Rookie | Nina Zaga | Episode: "An Internal Affairs Affair" |
| 1987 | Hot Child in the City | Rachel Wagner | Feature film |
| 1988 | Bloodsport | Janice Kent | Feature film |
| 1988 | Police Story: The Watch Commander | Nancy Morgan | Television film |
| 1989 | Who's the Boss? | Pam | Episode: "Heather Can Wait" |
| 1989 | Freddy's Nightmares | Roxanne Wodehouse | Episode: "Welcome to Springwood" |
| 1990 | The Bradys | Marcia Brady-Logan | Main role (6 episodes) |
| 1990 | Capital News | Stephanie Sellars | Episode: "Finished? Not Dunne" |
| 1991 | Who's the Boss? | Pam Harper | Episode: "Party Politics" |
| 1991 | P.S. I Luv U | Nicole Benton | Episode: "The Honeymooners" |
| 1992 | Baby Talk | Lois Herman | Episode: "Broadway Baby" |
| 1992 | Baby Talk | Lois Herman | Episode: "The Prince and the Pooper" |
| 1992 | The Player | Sandy | Feature film |
| 1992 | Married... with Children | Betty | Episode: "The Gas Station Show" |
| 1992 | Raven | Ellen | Episode: "Is Someone Crazy in Here or Is It Me" |
| 1995 | Walker, Texas Ranger | Tara Flynn | Episode: "Case Closed" |
| 1995 | Walker, Texas Ranger | Tara Flynn | Episode: "Point After" |
| 1995 | Walker, Texas Ranger | Tara Flynn | Episode: "Evil in the Night" |
| 1998 | The Journey of Allen Strange | Ms. Symonds | Episode: "Battle" |
| 1998 | Sliders | Darla | Episode: "Slidecage" |
