= Amerifit Brands =

American producer of numerous health and wellness brands

Amerifit Brands, Inc.
- Type: Subsidiary
- Genre: Health and wellness
- Headquarters: Cromwell, Connecticut, USA
- Key people: Wes Parris, CEO; Jeff Shirley, VP
- Products: AZO, Culturelle, Estroven, Flex Able, SofTouch, Sootherbs, Vitaball
- Parent: Martek
- Website: www.amerifit.com

Amerifit Brands, also commonly known as Amerifit, Inc. and Amerifit Nutrition, is an American corporation that produces numerous health and wellness brands, such as Estroven, AZO, and Culturelle. Its headquarters are located in Cromwell, Connecticut, but were previously located in Bloomfield, nearly 25 miles away. Its current CEO is Wes Parris.

== Brand names ==
=== AcuTrim ===
AcuTrim was an over-the-counter appetite suppressant first manufactured by the Ciba-Geigy Corporation in 1982. Ciba-Geigy merged with Sandoz to form Novartis in 1996 and shortly thereafter, in 1997, the brand was sold to Heritage Consumer Products. In 2000, however, the U.S. Food and Drug Administration requested that all manufacturers cease making products containing phenylpropanolamine (PPA), which included the AcuTrim brand. PPA is believed to increase the likelihood of suffering a hemorrhagic stroke, particularly in women. In 2001, the brand was acquired by Health and Nutrition Systems International. The AcuTrim brand comprised 22% of the company's sales for that year, 18% in 2002, and 7% for half of 2003. At that time, the product no longer contained PPA, but had been converted to a natural dietary supplement for weight loss. In August 2003, Amerifit acquired the brand name, and marketed a weight loss program under the name Acutrim, but it never contained PPA at any time. Then, in December 2005, the FDA issued an order that banned the over-the-counter sale of products containing PPA. Amerifit discontinued the product in 2005, but Amerifit still owns the AcuTrim trademark.

During its lifetime, varieties of the brand included AcuTrim Late Day and AcuTrim Complete.

=== Culturelle ===
Culturelle is a probiotic supplement featuring the Lactobacillus rhamnosus GG strain of bacteria.

=== Estroven ===
Estroven is a dietary supplement, first produced in 1997, used to treat the effects of hormonal imbalance in women during all stages of menopause. Estroven contains a standardized extract of black cohosh (Cimicifuga racemosa) and plant-based estrogens (called isoflavones) from soy, both used to help reduce hot flashes and night sweats. All varieties also include essential vitamins and minerals, such as calcium, boron, vitamin E, vitamin B6, vitamin B12, and folic acid.

=== Vitaball ===
Vitaball was a kind of gumball that contained vitamins. It came in various fruit flavors including: cherry, watermelon, grape, and bubble gum. It was recently discontinued.
