= List of Ithaca College alumni =

Ithacans are persons affiliated with Ithaca College, especially alumni. The following is a list of notable Ithacans.

== Art ==
- Nydia Blas, visual artist whose works explore the identities of young black women
- Cathleen Chaffee, art curator, art historian

== Business ==
- Chris Burch (B.S. 1976), founder and CEO of Burch Creative Capital; co-founder of Tory Burch LLC
- Bess Freedman (B.S. 1992), CEO Brown Harris Stevens
- Bob Iger (B.S. 1973), chairman and CEO, The Walt Disney Company
- Stew Leonard, Jr. (B.S. 1977), president and CEO, Stew Leonard's

== Entertainment ==
=== Actors ===
- Kathryn Allison, 2014 winner of the NYMF Next Big Broadway Sensation competition
- Erinn Bartlett, actress
- The Birthday Boys (2005, 2006), sketch comedy group and stars of IFC comedy show
- David Boreanaz (B.S. 1991), actor, Buffy the Vampire Slayer, Angel, Bones
- John Ross Bowie, actor, The Big Bang Theory
- Kerry Butler (B.F.A. 1992), Tony Award-nominated Broadway actress, Xanadu, Catch Me If You Can and Little Shop of Horrors
- Daniel Motta (B.F.A. 2021), Famed Youtuber, Danny Motta Channel also known as Alex Brightman's rival
- Matt Cavenaugh (B.F.A. 2001), Broadway actor, West Side Story
- Thom Christopher, Emmy Award-winning actor, Buck Rogers in the 25th Century and One Life to Live
- Andy Daly (1993), actor and comedian
- Ben Fankhauser (B.F.A.), theater actor best known for his role as Davey Jacobs in Newsies
- Michelle Federer (B.F.A. 1995), theater and film actress; originated the character Nessarose in Broadway's Wicked
- Ben Feldman, Emmy Award-nominated actor known for Mad Men and Superstore
- Ilene Graff, actress and singer
- Sean Grandillo, actor, Spring Awakening, The Real O'Neals, The Lost Boys.
- Jennifer Hall, actress
- Jeremy Jordan (B.F.A., 2007), Tony Award-nominated and Grammy Award-nominated star of Newsies and Bonnie & Clyde, also starred on Smash and in Joyful Noise
- Ricki Lake (non-degreed), Emmy Award-winning actress, Serial Mom, Hairspray; television host
- Gavin MacLeod, Golden Globe Award-nominated actor, The Love Boat, and The Mary Tyler Moore Show
- Daniel McDonald, Tony Award-nominated actor
- Mark Moses, actor, Desperate Housewives, Mad Men
- David Newsom, actor and producer
- Joe Pera (2010), stand-up comedian, actor, star/creator of Adult Swim's Joe Pera Talks with You
- CCH Pounder, Emmy Award-nominated actress, Bagdad Café, The Shield and Avatar
- Judson Pratt (1938), television, film and stage actor known for Union Pacific, Sergeant Rutledge and Born Yesterday
- Josh Andrés Rivera, (B.F.A ‘18), actor known for portraying Chino in Steven Spielberg’s West Side Story, and Sejanus Plinth in The Hunger Games: The Ballad of Songbirds & Snakes
- Brian Sack, humorist, author, and contributor on Fox News Channel's Glenn Beck program
- Charlie Schlatter, actor, Diagnosis: Murder
- Amanda Setton (B.A. 2007), film and TV actress, Gossip Girl, The Mindy Project, The Crazy Ones
- Aaron Tveit, Tony Award-winning actor in Moulin Rouge!, Catch Me If You Can and Next to Normal, starred in USA Network's Graceland and Fox's Grease: Live
- Jeff Winkless, voice-over actor
- Ali Louis Bourzgui, (B.F.A '21), Tony Award-winning actor and musician, The Lost Boys, The Who's Tommy.

=== Directors and producers ===
- Matthew Bennett (1986), scripted and non-scripted director and producer; created modern aftershow format with After the Catch
- Bill D'Elia, writer, director and executive producer of How to Get Away with Murder, Chicago Hope, Boston Legal, Ally McBeal and others; co-creator of Judging Amy
- Anna DeShawn, media personality and podcaster
- Peter Dougherty (1977), creator of Yo! MTV Raps
- Barbara Gaines (B.A. 1979), Emmy Award-winning executive producer, Late Show with David Letterman
- Brian Herzlinger (1997), director, special correspondent on The Tonight Show
- David Guy Levy, film producer, Would You Rather and Terri
- Jesse Zook Mann (B.S. 2002), Emmy Award-winning documentary film and television producer and director
- Mark Romanek, filmmaker (One Hour Photo, Never Let Me Go) and Grammy Award-winning music video director
- Mike Royce, executive producer and writer, Everybody Loves Raymond and One Day at a Time
- Deborah Snyder (1991), executive producer of Suicide Squad, 300 and Watchmen
- Larry Teng, television director and producer
- Liz Tigelaar, television writer and executive producer, Life Unexpected and Casual
- Alex Westerman, Webby Award-winning creative director

=== Hosts, presenters, and news anchors ===
- David Brody (B.S.1988), Emmy Award-winning journalist and White House Correspondent for the Christian Broadcasting Network
- Alan Colmes (non-degreed), television and radio host of Hannity & Colmes and The Alan Colmes Show
- Chip Hines (B.A. 1990), host of Spotlight on CatholicTV
- Chris Kellogg, morning radio host for WMAS-FM and The Kellogg Krew
- Bob Kur (B.S. 1970), Washington Post Radio, former NBC News national reporter
- David Muir (B.S. 1995), ABC World News anchor
- Jessica Savitch (B.S. 1968), the first female network anchor
- Todd Schnitt, conservative radio personality and host of The Schnitt Show
- Giorgio A. Tsoukalos (1998), television presenter specializing in the ancient astronaut hypothesis
- Robin Young, host of National Public Radio's Here and Now

=== Music ===
- Kate Aldrich (B.M. 1996), internationally renowned mezzo-soprano
- Rick Beato (B.M. 1980), YouTube personality, multi-instrumentalist, and music producer and educator
- Cindy Bradley (B.F.A. Jazz Studies 1998), jazz trumpet player and composer
- Nick Brignola, jazz baritone saxophonist
- Suzan Brittan, dance vocalist
- Robert E. Brown, lead ethnomusicologist and musician
- Ted Cohen (non-degreed), music industry executive
- Alec Coone, multi-instrumentalist member of Balam Acab
- Patricia Craig, renowned operatic soprano
- Margaret Daum, opera singer
- Richard De Benedictis (B.A. 1958), Broadway and television composer
- Henrique de Curitiba, composer
- Gavin DeGraw (non-degreed), Grammy Award-nominated and platinum-selling musician
- Tony DeSare (1997), jazz musician
- Julius Eastman (non-degreed), composer of minimal music
- Arnald Gabriel (1950), conductor emeritus of the U.S. Air Force Band
- Matthew Hoch, singer; leading music scholar and teacher
- Scott LaFaro, influential jazz bassist with the Bill Evans Trio
- New York Voices, Grammy Award-winning vocal music group of Ithaca alumni
- Maureen Tucker, drummer for The Velvet Underground
- Ruth Underwood, xylophonist for Frank Zappa and the Mothers of Invention
- Bora Yoon (B.A. 2002), musician

=== Screenwriters and designers ===
- Max Brallier, children's book author, Emmy Award-winning writer, and screenwriter; author of The Last Kids on Earth and Eerie Elementary
- Paul Gallo (B.F.A. 1974), Tony Award-nominated lighting designer, has designed more than 200 shows in NYC and regional theaters
- Allan Loeb, film screenwriter, Things We Lost in the Fire, Wall Street: Money Never Sleeps, The Dilemma
- Chris Regan (1989), Emmy Award-winning writer for The Daily Show
- Rod Serling, former faculty, taught at Ithaca College Communications School 1967–1975; Emmy Award-winning screenwriter; creator of The Twilight Zone

=== Sportscasters ===
- Bruce Beck (B.S. 1978), weekend sports anchor for WNBC, NY
- Brendan Burke (B.S. 2006), sportscaster for Fox Sports and television announcer for New York Islanders on MSG Network
- Mike Catalana (B.S. 1985), sports director WHAM-TV Rochester, New York
- Ed Cohen (B.S 2005), WEPN-FM radio voice of the New York Knicks
- Kevin Connors (B.S. 1997), ESPN sportscaster
- Giselle Donnelly, author of AEI's National Security Outlook
- Lanny Frattare (B.S. 1970), play-by-play announcer for MLB's Pittsburgh Pirates
- Eric Frede (B.S. 1988), Boston Bruins studio host, NESN
- Drew Goodman (B.S. 1985), television announcer for Colorado Rockies 2002–present, Denver Nuggets 1994–2004
- Neil Hartman (B.S. 1982), sports anchor, Comcast SportsNet Philadelphia
- Jack Michaels (B.S. 1995), announcer for the Edmonton Oilers on Sportsnet
- Nick Nickson, hockey broadcaster for Los Angeles Kings
- Sal Paolantonio, ESPN sportscaster; member of the college's Philadelphia Executive Committee
- Karl Ravech (B.S. 1987), ESPN sportscaster
- Eric Reid, TV announcer for Miami Heat

== Law ==
- Mitchell S. Goldberg (BA 1981), judge of the United States District Court for the Eastern District of Pennsylvania

== Literature and journalism ==
- Robert Bluey, editor of the daily online edition of Human Events
- Kristen Britain, author of Green Rider and First Rider's Call
- Jason Colavito, author
- Andrew Marchand, sports media reporter for the New York Post
- Sandra McDonald, author of The Outback Stars and The Stars Down Under
- Tish Rabe (1973), children's book author and writer of over 40 Dr. Seuss books
- Bill Roorbach, novelist, short story writer and memoirist
- K. M. Soehnlein, novelist and essayist
- Julia Spencer-Fleming, author of the Clare Fergusson/Russ Van Alstyne mystery series
- Julie Spira, author of The Perils of Cyber-Dating
- David A. Weiner (1990), executive editor of Famous Monsters of Filmland and writer/director of In Search of Darkness

== Politics ==
- Christopher Bateman, member of the New Jersey General Assembly
- Michael A. Battle, former director of the Executive Office for United States Attorneys, United States Department of Justice
- Ed Diana, county executive of Orange County, New York
- Richard K. Eaton, senior judge on the United States Court of International Trade
- Eileen Filler-Corn (B.A. 1986), speaker of the Virginia House of Delegates
- Emily Gallagher (2006), member of the New York State Assembly
- Loni Hancock, member of the California State Senate
- Ben Walsh (B.A. 2001), mayor of Syracuse, New York

== Science and medicine ==
- Richard Jadick (B.S. 1987), combat surgeon who was awarded the Bronze Star for service in Iraq
- C. William Schwab (B.A. chemistry 1968), chief of the Division of Traumatology, Surgical Critical Care and Emergency Surgery Research at the University of Pennsylvania
- Steven Van Slyke (B.S. 1978), chemist, inventor of the OLED, with over twenty patents related to OLEDs, materials, and device architecture

== Sports ==
- Glen Cook, professional baseball player for the Texas Rangers
- Conor Heun, mixed martial artist
- Tommy Hicks, former light heavyweight boxer
- Henny Hiemenz, head college football coach, Carroll University
- George Kissell, coach for St. Louis Cardinals
- Tim Locastro, professional baseball player for the New York Yankees
- Robert Marella, former professional wrestler (known as Gorilla Monsoon), ringside commentator for the World Wrestling Federation
- Emily Morley, first Bahamian rower to qualify for the Olympic Games
- Meghan Musnicki, rower and member of the gold medal-winning women's 8+ for the United States at the 2012 London Olympics
- Tom Nugent, college football head coach and sportscaster; College Football Hall of Famer; developer of the I Formation
- Les Otten (B.S. 1971), vice chairman and partner, Boston Red Sox Organization
- Eddie Sawyer, former Philadelphia Phillies manager and MLB scout
- Barry Smith, former NHL associate coach
- Travis Warech, American-German-Israeli basketball player for Israeli team Hapoel Be'er Sheva
- Jerry Welsh, head coach college basketball Potsdam State University, head coach college basketball Iona College
- Tony Wise, former NFL assistant coach
- Jeff Wittman, member of the College Football Hall of Fame

== Other ==
- Kathryn Krick (2013), American Pentecostal pastor and social media personality
