= Clifford's Puppy Days =

Animated children's television series

- Genre: Children's
- Based on: Clifford the Big Red Dog by: Norman Bridwell
- Developed by: Deborah Forte; Martha Atwater; Jef Kaminsky; Jessica Wollman
- Directed by: Bob Doucette (season 1); Joey Ahlbum (season 2)
- Voices of: Lara Jill Miller; Grey DeLisle; Cam Clarke; Kath Soucie; Masiela Lusha; Orlando Brown; LaTonya Holmes; Ogie Banks; Jess Harnell; Lauren Tom; Henry Winkler; Candi Milo
- Theme music composer: Jared Faber; Emily Kapnek
- Opening theme: "Love Makes Little Things Grow" performed by Freedom Bremner
- Ending theme: "Love Makes Little Things Grow" (Instrumental)
- Composer: Jared Faber
- Country of origin: United States
- Original language: English
- No. of seasons: 2
- No. of episodes: 39 (78 segments)

Production
- Executive producer: Deborah Forte
- Producers: Jef Kaminsky; Jessica Wollman
- Running time: 25 minutes
- Production companies: Scholastic Productions; Mike Young Productions (season 1)

Original release
- Network: PBS Kids
- Release: September 1, 2003 – February 25, 2006

Related
- Clifford the Big Red Dog (2000); Clifford the Big Red Dog (2019)

Clifford's Puppy Days is an American animated television series that originally aired on PBS Kids from September 1, 2003 to February 25, 2006. The prequel to the 2000–2003 series Clifford the Big Red Dog, it features the adventures of Clifford during his puppy days before he became a big red dog and before moving to Birdwell Island.

The series ended in February 2006 after two seasons and 39 episodes. Since then, occasional reruns continued to air, typically on holidays until April 2022.

In the United Kingdom, the series aired on CBeebies until early 2011 and like the original series, the prequel was dubbed with British voice actors, replacing the original American soundtrack.

The show featured Henry Winkler as the voice of Norville. For his role as Norville, Winkler was nominated for 2 Daytime Emmy Awards for Outstanding Performer in an Animated Program for his work on the series, one of which he won in 2005.

== Premise ==
Set two years before the events of Clifford the Big Red Dog, the series focuses on when Clifford was a tiny red puppy. Clifford was the runt in a litter of puppies born to the pet dog of Emily Elizabeth's neighbor, Mr. Bradley (who appeared in an episode of the previous cartoon series, "Little Clifford"). He was adopted by Emily Elizabeth before he grew up into a giant red adult dog, forcing the Howard family to move out of their small apartment so Clifford would be able to live comfortably. The series shows Clifford and Emily Elizabeth's life and friends before they moved from the city to Birdwell Island.

== Format ==
The series followed the same format as its predecessor, Clifford the Big Red Dog.

- The opening theme is followed by one central story, which is sometimes about Clifford and his friends.
- Storytime with Speckle – Between the first and second story, Emily Elizabeth reads Clifford a Speckle Story, a short 60-second (approximately) time filler about a fictional dog (Speckle) and his animal friends Darnell (a duck), Reba (a rabbit), Ravi (a panda), and Luna (a racoon).
- This is followed by another central story, sometimes about Emily Elizabeth and her friends.
- Clifford's Idea to Grow On – Before the credits, another 30-second short takes place called Clifford's Idea to Grow On. The short is basically an animation of an etiquette, a proverb, or basic truth such as "Play Fair", "Help Others", etc., with narration by Emily Elizabeth. This short was called Clifford's Big Idea in the previous series.
- Live action segments with real kids and their dogs.

Like the original series, on UK airings, only one story is shown, with either the Storytime with Speckle or the Clifford's Idea to Grow On segments at the end, shortening the show to about 15 minutes.

== Characters ==
=== Humans ===
- Emily Elizabeth Howard (voiced by Grey DeLisle in the US version and Joanna Ruiz in the British version) is the 6-year-old owner of Clifford and Daffodil. DeLisle reprises her role from the previous series.
- Nina Flores (voiced by Masiela Lusha in the US version and Julie-Ann Dean in the British version) – is a young Mexican-American girl and the owner of Jorge.
- Evan Thomas Taylor (voiced by Orlando Brown) is a Black American boy who looks a few years older than Emily Elizabeth.
- Shun (voiced by Lauren Tom in the US version and Ben Small in the British version) is a young Japanese-American boy.
- Mr. Solomon (voiced by Alan Oppenheimer) is a writer who uses a wheelchair. Flo and Zo are his two pet kittens. He and his pet kittens are Jewish.
- Mrs. Z (voiced by Russi Taylor) is an elderly Italian woman who was once in the circus and the owner of Tricksie.
- Jenny (voiced by Dionne Quan) is a blind girl and owner of Bebe.
- Vanessa (voiced by LaTonya Holmes) is a girl who first appears in the first season episode Keeping Cool. She also appeared in the second season episode Celebrating Spring.
- Caroline Howard (voiced by Grey DeLisle) is Emily Elizabeth's mother and the wife of Mark Howard. DeLisle reprises her role from the previous series.
- Mark Howard (voiced by Cam Clarke) is Emily Elizabeth's father and the husband of Caroline Howard. Clarke reprises his role from the previous series.

=== Animals ===
- Clifford (voiced by Lara Jill Miller in the US version and Lizzie Waterworth-Santo in the British version) is a small red puppy. His owner is Emily Elizabeth Howard; he is also the younger adoptive brother of Daffodil.
- Daffodil (voiced by Kath Soucie) is a Holland Lop. In the first half of the series she was originally pink, but her fur was changed to white in the second half; she is also the older adoptive sister of Clifford.
- Flo (voiced by LaTonya Holmes) and Zo (voiced by Ogie Banks) are brother and sister kittens owned by Mr. Solomon. They and their owner are Jewish.
- The Sidarskis are a family of mice who live in the laundromat. They have five children: Lucy, Lewis, Sophie and Sid, and a newly-born baby boy who is unnamed.
- Jorge (US)/George (UK) (voiced by Jess Harnell in the US version and Ben Small in the British version) is a brown dachshund owned by Nina.
- Bebe (voiced by Jill Talley) is a Golden Retriever Seeing-eye dog owned by Jenny.
- Tricksie (voiced by Russi Taylor) is an elderly Golden Retriever dog who once performed in the circus with Mrs. Z.
- Norville (voiced by Henry Winkler in the US version and Tom Eastwood in the British version) is a bird who lives all on his own.
- Chereath (voiced by LaTonya Holmes) is a Labrador Retriever puppy whose only appearance is in the episode "Your Secret Valentine".
- Teacup (voiced by Lucy Liu) is an adult—albeit "miniature"—poodle who has spent most of her life in the pound, as shown in her only appearance in the episode "Adopt a Pup." She eventually gets adopted by an elderly woman who had always wanted a dog, but never had enough room in her apartment for a normal-sized one.
- Bobby (voiced by Philip Hayes) is a giant terrier puppy.
- Jack (voiced by Tara Strong) is a competitive puppy who is featured in a sandcastle contest that he competes against Clifford and Jorge.

== Episodes ==
Each half-hour episode was divided into 2 stories.

Season	Episodes	Originally released	
Season	Episodes	First released	Last released
1	25	September 1, 2003	February 19, 2005
2	14	September 12, 2005	February 25, 2006

=== Season 1 (2003–2005) ===
No. overall	No. in season	Title	Directed by	Written by	Storyboard by	Original release date
1	1	"Keeping Cool"	Bob Doucette	Frederick Stroppel Suzanne Collins	Dan Kuenster Jeff Gordon	September 1, 2003
1	1	"Socks & Snooze"	Bob Doucette	Frederick Stroppel Suzanne Collins	Dan Kuenster Jeff Gordon	September 1, 2003
2	2	"The Monster in 3B"	Bob Doucette	Suzanne Collins Barry "Baz" Hawkins	Cynthia Petrovic Curtis Cim	September 1, 2003
2	2	"Cat-tastrophe"	Bob Doucette	Suzanne Collins Barry "Baz" Hawkins	Cynthia Petrovic Curtis Cim	September 1, 2003
3	3	"Jorge and the Dog Run"	Bob Doucette	Jeff Borkin James Ponti	Dave Cunningham and Dan Kuenster Cynthia Petrovic	September 17, 2003
3	3	"Clifford's Clubhouse"	Bob Doucette	Jeff Borkin James Ponti	Dave Cunningham and Dan Kuenster Cynthia Petrovic	September 17, 2003
4	4	"Paw Print Picasso"	Bob Doucette	Tish Rabe Peter Bakalian	Michael Kim Anna Burns	October 15, 2003
4	4	"Hup Hup"	Bob Doucette	Tish Rabe Peter Bakalian	Michael Kim Anna Burns	October 15, 2003
5	5	"Sock It to Me"	Bob Doucette	Dev Ross Alan Goodman	Lenord Robinson Curt Walstead	October 1, 2003
5	5	"My Toy"	Bob Doucette	Dev Ross Alan Goodman	Lenord Robinson Curt Walstead	October 1, 2003
6	6	"Friends of All Ages"	Bob Doucette	Dev Ross Tish Rabe	Dan Kuenster Tim George	October 8, 2003
6	6	"Clifford's Super Sleepover"	Bob Doucette	Dev Ross Tish Rabe	Dan Kuenster Tim George	October 8, 2003
7	7	"Clifford's Field Trip"	Bob Doucette	Sindy McKay Dev Ross	Kevin Frank Tim George	December 10, 2003
7	7	"Helping Paws"	Bob Doucette	Sindy McKay Dev Ross	Kevin Frank Tim George	December 10, 2003
8	8	"Nina's Perfect Party"	Bob Doucette	Frederick Stroppel Jeff Borkin	Lenord Robinson Byron Vaughns	December 17, 2003
8	8	"Just the Right Size"	Bob Doucette	Frederick Stroppel Jeff Borkin	Lenord Robinson Byron Vaughns	December 17, 2003
9	9	"Something Special"	Bob Doucette	James Ponti Tish Rabe	Roy Meurin Gloria Jenkins	October 29, 2003
9	9	"Shun Gets in the Game"	Bob Doucette	James Ponti Tish Rabe	Roy Meurin Gloria Jenkins	October 29, 2003
10	10	"Clifford's Winter Spirit"	Bob Doucette	Jeff Borkin Frederick Stroppel	Holly Boruck Trevor Wall	November 5, 2003
10	10	"Flo-Motion"	Bob Doucette	Jeff Borkin Frederick Stroppel	Holly Boruck Trevor Wall	November 5, 2003
11	11	"No Small Parts"	Bob Doucette	Jeff Borkin Peter Bakalian	Stephen Sandoval Kevin Frank	February 16, 2004
11	11	"Fine Feather Friend"	Bob Doucette	Jeff Borkin Peter Bakalian	Stephen Sandoval Kevin Frank	February 16, 2004
12	12	"Sing-a-Song Norville"	Bob Doucette	Barry "Baz" Hawkins Sindy McKay	Byron Vaughns Tim George	February 17, 2004
12	12	"Tell Me a Tale"	Bob Doucette	Barry "Baz" Hawkins Sindy McKay	Byron Vaughns Tim George	February 17, 2004
13	13	"Hoop Dreams"	Bob Doucette	Frederick Stroppel Dev Ross	Roy Meurin Gloria Jenkins	February 18, 2004
13	13	"Doggie Duds"	Bob Doucette	Frederick Stroppel Dev Ross	Roy Meurin Gloria Jenkins	February 18, 2004
14	14	"Best Nest"	Bob Doucette	Dennis Haley and Marcy Brown James Ponti	Trevor Wall Ralph Zondag	February 19, 2004
14	14	"Practice Makes Perfect"	Bob Doucette	Dennis Haley and Marcy Brown James Ponti	Trevor Wall Ralph Zondag	February 19, 2004
15	15	"Your Secret Valentine"	Bob Doucette	Barry "Baz" Hawkins James Ponti	Ken Laramay Gloria Jenkins	February 20, 2004
15	15	"Perfect Pet"	Bob Doucette	Barry "Baz" Hawkins James Ponti	Ken Laramay Gloria Jenkins	February 20, 2004
16	16	"My Blanky"	Bob Doucette	Peter Bakalian Barry "Baz" Hawkins	John Howley Stephen Sandoval and Jeff Gordon	September 5, 2004
16	16	"With Friends Like You"	Bob Doucette	Peter Bakalian Barry "Baz" Hawkins	John Howley Stephen Sandoval and Jeff Gordon	September 5, 2004
17	17	"Time Out"	Bob Doucette	Dennis Haley and Marcy Brown Alan Goodman	Rafael Rosado Tim George	September 8, 2004
17	17	"Sniff, Sniff"	Bob Doucette	Dennis Haley and Marcy Brown Alan Goodman	Rafael Rosado Tim George	September 8, 2004
18	18	"A Promise Is a Promise"	Bob Doucette	Sindy McKay Tish Rabe	Roy Meurin Gloria Jenkins	September 12, 2004
18	18	"Share and Share Alike"	Bob Doucette	Sindy McKay Tish Rabe	Roy Meurin Gloria Jenkins	September 12, 2004
19	19	"Fall Feast"	Bob Doucette	Barry "Baz" Hawkins Jeff Borkin	Trevor Wall Diane Kredensor	September 15, 2004
19	19	"Norville's New Game"	Bob Doucette	Barry "Baz" Hawkins Jeff Borkin	Trevor Wall Diane Kredensor	September 15, 2004
20	20	"Oh, Brother"	Bob Doucette	Sindy McKay Dev Ross	Kathy Carr John Howley	September 19, 2004
20	20	"Up, Up, & Oops!"	Bob Doucette	Sindy McKay Dev Ross	Kathy Carr John Howley	September 19, 2004
21	21	"Moving On"	Bob Doucette	Frederick Stroppel James Ponti	Kevin Frank Tim George	September 22, 2004
21	21	"Fair Is Fair"	Bob Doucette	Frederick Stroppel James Ponti	Kevin Frank Tim George	September 22, 2004
22	22	"Grooming Gloom"	Bob Doucette	Sindy McKay Alan Goodman	Roy Meurin Gloria Jenkins	September 26, 2004
22	22	"The Letter"	Bob Doucette	Sindy McKay Alan Goodman	Roy Meurin Gloria Jenkins	September 26, 2004
23	23	"Adopt-a-Pup"	Bob Doucette	Suzanne Collins Barry "Baz" Hawkins	Diane Kredensor Kathy Carr	February 15, 2005
23	23	"Jokes on You"	Bob Doucette	Suzanne Collins Barry "Baz" Hawkins	Diane Kredensor Kathy Carr	February 15, 2005
24	24	"Lights, Camera, Action"	Bob Doucette	James Ponti Deborah Forte and Frederick Stroppel	John Howley Dan Kuenster and Tim George	February 16, 2005
24	24	"Basketball Babysitter"	Bob Doucette	James Ponti Deborah Forte and Frederick Stroppel	John Howley Dan Kuenster and Tim George	February 16, 2005
25	25	"The Halloween Bandit"	Bob Doucette	Peter Bakalian Dennis Haley and Marcy Brown	Diane Kredensor Roy Meurin	February 17, 2005
25	25	"An Honest Spin"	Bob Doucette	Peter Bakalian Dennis Haley and Marcy Brown	Diane Kredensor Roy Meurin	February 17, 2005

=== Specials (2004–2005) ===
No.	Title	Original release date
—	"Smooches & Pooches"	February 9, 2004
One-hour Valentine's special that includes three stories from Clifford the Big Red Dog ("Clifford's Big Heart," "Big Hearted T-Bone" and "Cleo's Valentine Surprise") and one story from Clifford's Puppy Days ("Your Secret Valentine").
—	"Clifford's Heart-y Party"	February 14, 2005
One-hour Valentine's Special that includes two stories from Clifford the Big Red Dog ("T-Bone, Dog About Town" and "Mimi's Back in Town") and from Clifford's Puppy Days ("Valentines Schmalentines" and "Sweetheart's Dance").

=== Season 2 (2005–2006) ===
No. overall	No. in season	Title	Directed by	Written by	Storyboard by	Original release date
26	1	"Small Packages"	Joey Ahlbum	Frederick Stroppel Sindy McKay	Scott Cooper and Jason McDonald Jennifer Batinich and Mike Wisniewski	September 12, 2005
26	1	"Clifford's Magic Lamp"	Joey Ahlbum	Frederick Stroppel Sindy McKay	Scott Cooper and Jason McDonald Jennifer Batinich and Mike Wisniewski	September 12, 2005
27	2	"Finders Keepers?"	Joey Ahlbum	Peter Bakalian	Jennifer Batinich and Mike Wisniewski Scott Cooper and Frank Detrano	September 13, 2005
27	2	"You're Famous!"	Joey Ahlbum	Peter Bakalian	Jennifer Batinich and Mike Wisniewski Scott Cooper and Frank Detrano	September 13, 2005
28	3	"Puppy Dog Power"	Joey Ahlbum	Dev Ross Sindy McKay	Jennifer Batinich and Mike Wisniewski Scott Cooper	September 14, 2005
28	3	"Extra! Extra!"	Joey Ahlbum	Dev Ross Sindy McKay	Jennifer Batinich and Mike Wisniewski Scott Cooper	September 14, 2005
29	4	"Sandcastle Hassle"	Joey Ahlbum	Jeff Borkin Suzanne Collins	Jennifer Batinich and Mike Wisniewski Scott Cooper and Frank Detrano	September 15, 2005
29	4	"School Daze"	Joey Ahlbum	Jeff Borkin Suzanne Collins	Jennifer Batinich and Mike Wisniewski Scott Cooper and Frank Detrano	September 15, 2005
30	5	"Celebrating Spring"	Joey Ahlbum	Dennis Haley and Marcy Brown Dev Ross	Mike Wisniewski and Frank Detrano Jennifer Batinich and Scott Cooper	September 16, 2005
30	5	"Garden Delights"	Joey Ahlbum	Dennis Haley and Marcy Brown Dev Ross	Mike Wisniewski and Frank Detrano Jennifer Batinich and Scott Cooper	September 16, 2005
31	6	"Clifford the Scary Puppy"	Joey Ahlbum	Frederick Stroppel James Ponti	Mike Wisniewski and Frank Detrano Mike Wisniewski, Jennifer Batinich and Frank Detrano	October 26, 2005
31	6	"Things That Go Bump"	Joey Ahlbum	Frederick Stroppel James Ponti	Mike Wisniewski and Frank Detrano Mike Wisniewski, Jennifer Batinich and Frank Detrano	October 26, 2005
32	7	"The Big, Big Present"	Joey Ahlbum	Dev Ross Baz Hawkins	Dan Haskett and Frank Detrano Jennifer Batinich and Scott Cooper	December 21, 2005
32	7	"Hanukah Plunder Blunder"	Joey Ahlbum	Dev Ross Baz Hawkins	Dan Haskett and Frank Detrano Jennifer Batinich and Scott Cooper	December 21, 2005
33	8	"Valentines Schmalentines"	Joey Ahlbum	Jeff Borkin James Ponti	Mike Wisniewski, Ian Freedman and Frank Detrano Jennifer Batinich and Scott Cooper	February 14, 2006
33	8	"Sweetheart's Dance"	Joey Ahlbum	Jeff Borkin James Ponti	Mike Wisniewski, Ian Freedman and Frank Detrano Jennifer Batinich and Scott Cooper	February 14, 2006
34	9	"The Big Surprise"	Joey Ahlbum	Frederick Stroppel Baz Hawkins	John Holmquist Jennifer Batinich and Scott Cooper	February 15, 2006
34	9	"Be My Guest"	Joey Ahlbum	Frederick Stroppel Baz Hawkins	John Holmquist Jennifer Batinich and Scott Cooper	February 15, 2006
35	10	"Clifford's Little Friend"	Joey Ahlbum	Frederick Stroppel Sindy McKay	Mike Wisniewski and Frank Detrano Jennifer Batinich and Scott Cooper	February 16, 2006
35	10	"Tricky Business"	Joey Ahlbum	Frederick Stroppel Sindy McKay	Mike Wisniewski and Frank Detrano Jennifer Batinich and Scott Cooper	February 16, 2006
36	11	"But I Really, Really Saw It!"	Joey Ahlbum	Peter Bakalian Dennis Haley and Marcy Brown	Mike Wisniewski and Frank Detrano Jennifer Batinich and Scott Cooper	February 17, 2006
36	11	"The Perfect Pancake"	Joey Ahlbum	Peter Bakalian Dennis Haley and Marcy Brown	Mike Wisniewski and Frank Detrano Jennifer Batinich and Scott Cooper	February 17, 2006
37	12	"Show and Tell"	Joey Ahlbum	Peter Bakalian Dennis Haley and Marcy Brown	Ian Freedman and Frank Detrano Mike Wisniewski, Jennifer Batinich and Scott Cooper	February 20, 2006
37	12	"What a Story"	Joey Ahlbum	Peter Bakalian Dennis Haley and Marcy Brown	Ian Freedman and Frank Detrano Mike Wisniewski, Jennifer Batinich and Scott Cooper	February 20, 2006
38	13	"Lost and Found"	Joey Ahlbum	Dev Ross Dennis Haley and Marcy Brown	Ian Freedman and Frank Detrano Jennifer Batinich and Scott Cooper	February 22, 2006
38	13	"Basketball Blunders"	Joey Ahlbum	Dev Ross Dennis Haley and Marcy Brown	Ian Freedman and Frank Detrano Jennifer Batinich and Scott Cooper	February 22, 2006
39	14	"Heroes and Friends"	Joey Ahlbum	Sindy McKay Frederick Stroppel	Dan Haskett and Frank Detrano Jennifer Batinich and Scott Cooper	February 25, 2006
39	14	"The Cookie Crumbles"	Joey Ahlbum	Sindy McKay Frederick Stroppel	Dan Haskett and Frank Detrano Jennifer Batinich and Scott Cooper	February 25, 2006

== Opening theme ==
The opening theme, "Love Makes Little Things Grow", was composed by Jared Faber and Emily Kapnek (creator of Nickelodeon's As Told by Ginger) and performed by Freedom Bremner.
