= The High King's Tomb =

Novel by Kristen Britain

- First edition
- Author: Kristen Britain
- Cover artist: Donato Giancola
- Language: English
- Series: Green Rider (series)
- Genre: Epic fantasy
- Publisher: DAW Books
- Publication date: November 6, 2007
- Publication place: United States
- Media type: Print (Hardback)
- Pages: 679
- ISBN: 978-0-7564-0266-2
- OCLC: 150361032
- Preceded by: First Rider's Call
- Followed by: Blackveil

The High King's Tomb is the third novel in Kristen Britain's Green Rider series.

== Plot summary ==
Karigan G’Ladheon, a member of the King's Green Rider messenger service, finds her life increasingly tangled in the third book of the Green Rider series. King Zachary, for whom Karigan has feelings, has admitted his feeling for Karigan but is being forced into a political marriage with Lady Estora of Coutre. This causes difficulties for all three as Karigan and Zachary cannot be together and Karigan is now jealous of Estora and ceases to show friendship to her former friend.

Soon Karigan is sent on several messenger errands as Captain Mapstone attempts to separate her from King Zachary. Accompanied by rider-in-training Fergal Duff, she delivers several messages, the last one a decoy message presented to her old school nemesis, now lord-governor Timas Mirwell, in an attempt to contact Rider Beryl Spencer.

Meanwhile, Riders Alton D’yer and Dale Littlepage's attempts to mend the wall at the Blackveil Forest are met with failure, and the wall's strength continues to wane.

“Grandmother,” the leader of the Second Empire, plans to overthrow Sacoridia in the name of the Empire. She is a member of Second Empire, a remnant of those who came to Sacoridia from Arcosia with Mornhavon the Black. By using her magic and a book that can only be read "by the light of the High King's tomb", Grandmother plans to destroy the D’Yer Wall. This book, written by one of the last great mages, contains the secrets of the D'Yer Wall; how it was built and how to maintain it. It is a race between Second Empire and the Green Riders to obtain the book to either destroy or repair the great wall.

After delivering her messages, Karigan discovers that Lady Estora has been kidnapped by men working with Second Empire. She offers herself as a distraction, trading clothes with Estora, to allow the King's betrothed to escape safely and return to Sacor City. Karigan is captured but escapes with the aid of Lord Xandis Amberhill. Knowing Grandmother's plot, Karigan travels back to Sacor City to thwart Second Empire and gain possession of the book.

When she arrives, Karigan joins a band of Weapons (guards highly committed to guarding the King and the tombs of dead royalty) who enter the tombs to stop the Second Empire from reading the book. Karigan successfully recovers the book, with the help of the god Westrion.

In the aftermath of these events, Karigan is knighted by King Zachary and a translation of the book is given to Alton D'Yer in the hopes that he can discern the secrets in repairing the breach in the wall. Grandmother and the members of Second Empire journey through the breach into Blackveil hoping to "awake the sleepers".

The author has confirmed that there are more books to come. The fourth book in the series, "Blackveil," was released in February 2011.

== Characters ==
- Karigan G'ladheon
- Alton D'yer
- King Zachary
- Lady Estora
- Arms master Drent
- Immerez
- Jametari
- Captain Mapstone
- Fergal Duff
- Grandmother
- Lord Amberhill
- Dale Littlepage

== See also ==
- Green Rider - First book of the Green Rider Series
- First Rider's Call - Second book of the Green Rider Series
- The High King's Tomb – Third book of the "Green Rider" series
- Blackveil - Fourth book of the Green Rider Series
- Mirror Sight - Fifth book of the Green Rider series
- Firebrand - Sixth book of the "Green Rider" series
