= Majestic International =

Multinational organization

Majestic International Company
- Type: Limited Liability Company
- Founded: 1981
- Area served: Saudi Arabia Offices (Riyadh, Jeddah, Khobar) United Arab Emirates Office (Dubai) USA Office (New York)
- Key people: Mohammad Mabrouk (CEO)
- Number of employees: over 1500
- Website: https://www.majesticint.us/

Majestic International Company is a multinational organization founded in 1981 in the United Arab Emirates, uniting a dozen of firms from retail, logistics, construction, etc. industries.

== History ==
The company was founded in 1981 by a consortium of American investors. In the early 1990s, Majestic International expanded its market to the United States. The name Majestic comes from the group of companies owned by the same investors. Majestic is a group of companies having the same name, practicing business in 14 different sectors and running its business around the world.

The company expanded its operations to the Kingdom of Saudi Arabia (KSA) and the United Arab Emirates (UAE), with offices located in New York City, Riyadh, Jeddah, Khobar, and Dubai. Majestic International focuses on providing logistics technologies.

In 2012, Majestic International Company established a LEED-certified facility.

In 2019, Mohammad Mabrouk appointed CEO position in Majestic International Company.

In 2023, the company was certified by Great Place To Work.

== Divisions ==
Majestic Group of companies consists of dozen of firms.

=== Majestic Athletic ===
Majestic Athletic, an official U.S. sports team apparel retailer, offers a wide range of MLB merchandise, including Cool Base Jerseys, Flex Base Jerseys, T-shirts, and sweatshirts. It was initially a subsidiary of VF Imagewear Inc.

=== Majestic Steel ===
Majestic Steel is Cleveland-based steel company which specializes in the steel supply chain, offering inventory management, processing, and distribution for over 3,000 clients. Majestic Steel has over 250 employees steel stocks exceeding 200 million pound. In 2023, Majestic Steel has acquired Georgia's Quicken Steel and California's Mercury Transport, enhancing its growth strategy and market reach. Earlier Majestic Steel bought west Coast-based service centre chain Merit Steel USA.

In 2023, Majestic Steel USA expanded its operations with the addition of a new facility in Hickman, Arkansas, enhancing its material handling capabilities with advanced equipment such as custom telescopic coil grabs from The Caldwell Group. The Hickman facility is equipped to process a wide range of steel products, catering to various markets including construction, HVAC, and transportation.

In 2023, Majestic Steel secured a $287.5 million 3-year Senior Secured Credit Facility from White Oak finalized the deal.

In 2021, Majestic Steel USA announced the establishment of a new service center and processing plant on Nucor Steel's Blytheville campus, aiming to create 225 jobs and optimize cost efficiency through direct steel processing from the mill.

In 2017, Majestic Steel Properties, linked Majestic Steel, faced a lawsuit by Brown Harris Stevens Miami for allegedly reneging on a real estate commission. The brokerage claims it secured a buyer for one of Majestic Steel Properties' luxury condos in South Beach, with an agreed 6% commission on a $12 million sale. Despite a buyer's deposit and a purchase agreement, the sale did not finalize, and Brown Harris Stevens alleges Majestic Steel Properties withheld their $540,000 commission.

=== Majestic Marine Engineering ===
Founded in the 1980s in the UAE, Majestic Marine Engineering LLC is a specialized company with a workforce of 300, providing complete marina construction services and marine contracting, including pontoons and various marine civil works. In 2018, Nakheel, a Dubai-based developer, started investing AED 15 million in the construction of two new marinas on Palm Jumeirah. These additions are set to increase the island's boat mooring capacity to a total of 600 berths. Majestic Marine Engineering has been commissioned to construct the marinas, with Applied Technology and Management Inc. serving as the project consultant.
