= Blackveil =

Novel by Kristen Britain

- First edition
- Author: Kristen Britain
- Cover artist: Donato Giancola
- Language: English
- Series: Green Rider (series)
- Genre: Epic fantasy
- Publisher: DAW Books
- Publication date: February 1, 2011
- Publication place: United States
- Media type: Print (hardback)
- Pages: 664
- ISBN: 978-0-7564-0660-8
- OCLC: 693779330
- Preceded by: The High Kings Tomb
- Followed by: Mirror Sight

Blackveil by Kristen Britain is a fantasy novel from 2011, the fourth book in the Green Rider series.

== Plot summary ==
Blackveil Forest was once the home of the Eletians, a magical elf-like race. Corrupted and warped into an evil place by Mornhavon the Black during the Long War, the realm has been sealed away for a millennium behind the D’yer Wall, a magically enhanced barrier that has been neglected by the humans and the Elt for centuries. Strange occurrences in Blackveil Forest have escalated since the Wall was breached during the events of Green Rider. Both the Eletians and the Sacoridians need more information on what threats exist in the forest; the two races agree to a joint expedition to investigate what lies south of the Wall.

Rider Sir Karigan G'ladheon visits her family and informs them of the knighthood bestowed up on her at the end of The High King's Tomb. Upon her return to Sacor City, she finds her role as a knight draws her into in court life more than she’d like, yet she rarely sees King Zachary and his betrothed Lady Estora. She does keep running into the King’s cousin Lord Xandis Amberhill, who tries to learn more about Karigan’s ability to fade out.

At the Wall, Rider Alton D’yer is desperate to repair the breach but unable to do so. Estral Andovian, Karigan’s best friend and the daughter of the Golden Guardian, arrives and begins to heal the wall with her singing. Estral helps Alton and the other Riders gain access to the towers that span the length of the wall, where they can communicate with ancient sage like wizards who witnessed the creation of the wall. Estral and Alton fall in love and worry about how break their new relationship to Karigan.

King Zachary is furious when Captain Lauren Mapstone, the commander of the Green Riders and his closest confidant, selects Karigan as one of the members of the Sacoridian portion of the Blackveil expedition because of her past experiences with the forest and the Eletians. Their argument is overheard by the ambitious Lord Richmont Spane, who realizes that the King’s love for a commoner could jeopardize his cousin Estora’s upcoming marriage and spoil his own plans to expand his power in the kingdom. Spane arranges for one of his own loyal followers, a forester named Ard, to join the expedition so he can murder Karigan if she somehow manages to survive the dangers posed by the forest.

Karigan and the rest of the Sacoridian expedition – which consists of two Sacoridan soldiers, Ard, and Green Riders Lynx and Yates – rendezvous with six Eletians at the Wall on the day of the spring equinox as planned. Hoping to find comfort with Alton before heading into such a dangerous realm, Karigan takes the news of Alton and Estral’s relationship as a personal betrayal and parts with them on bad terms. Once in Blackveil, Karigan and her companions head for Castle Argenthyne, the ancient home of the Eletians. The Eletians travelling with her reveal that their goal is to rescue the sleeping Eletians who have been trapped in Blackveil, sealed within a pocket of time. The expedition faces many dangers during their journey through the forest; more than half its members dies, including Rider Yates and Ard.

On the day of the spring equinox, Captain Mapstone suggests that the King should find a way to distract himself from his anxiety over the Blackveil expedition. Zachary decides to go for a ride in the country with Lady Estora and an entourage. However, an assassination attempt is made upon the king's life. Zachary takes a poisoned arrow to the chest, leaving him near death. With the King's life and the state of the kingdom in the balance, Spane and most of Zachary’s closest advisors advocate for a deathbed wedding. The only two who object are Captain Mapstone, who is drugged and confined to the mending wing, and Lady Estora, who is blackmailed by Spane into following his orders. The wedding proceeds and the rite of consummation is performed while Zachary is too feverish to realize what is going on. Queen Estora, who by now has fallen in love with Zachary, learns of his true feelings when he calls out Karigan’s name while making love to her. The new queen enlists the aid of Green Rider Beryl Spencer to find evidence of Spane’s duplicity and he is arrested. Eventually, Zachary recovers and passes judgement on those of his advisors who betrayed him, but at Captain Mapstone’s intervention he decides not to invalidate his marriage to Estora.

Descendants of The Second Empire, led by the necromancer Grandmother, enter Blackveil Forest before the Sacoridians and Eletians to follow Mornhavon’s orders to awaken the Sleepers in the present. The Sleepers have been largely protected by the spirit of their Queen, but after their long confinement in the tainted forest, a few of the sleeping Eletians have been corrupted into evil, mindless, dark creatures. At least one of the corrupted Sleepers make it inside of one of the towers at the Wall; Alton kills that Sleeper and conveys the danger posed by the Sleepers back to Sacor City. Karigan uses her Green Rider abilities to cross the layers of the White World and to lead most of the Sleepers to safety in the past.

While still in Blackveil, Grandmother senses that Estral is strengthening the D’Yer Wall and coming close to discovering the magical strand of music that will repair the breach. Grandmother constructs her own spell and sends it to the wall. The dark spell strips Estral of her voice and transfers it to Grandmother’s mute granddaughter Lala, who can now begin her training as the next leader of Second Empire in earnest.

Karigan is once again forced to fight for her life against Mornhavon and a peculiar mirror-masked tumbler in the White Would who offers her the power to control the strands of the universe. Focused only on denying Mornhavon the thing he desires most, she destroys the mirror mask and tumbles through space and time, sending the surviving members of the expedition out of Blackveil in the process. She is saved from the endless blackness by the God Westrion, who deposits her in a sealed crypt, in which she is trapped and running out of air.

Meanwhile, Amberhill tracks down more of the pirates he originally encountered near the Berry sisters’ manor and takes one of the pirates, Yap, into his employ. Amberhill and Yap leave Sacor City and sail in search of the island that the dragon stone ring Amberhill now possesses originated from. Their craft eventually crashes into an island inhabited by a Yolande the sea goddess.

== Characters ==
- Karigan G'ladheon
- Alton D'yer
- King Zachary
- Lady Estora
- Captain Mapstone
- Grandmother
- Lord Amberhill

== See also ==
- Green Rider - First book of the Green Rider Series
- First Rider's Call - Second book of the Green Rider Series
- The High Kings Tomb - Third book of the Green Rider Series
- Blackveil - Fourth book of the Green Rider Series
- Mirror Sight - Fifth book of the Green Rider series
- Firebrand - Sixth book of the "Green Rider" series
