= First Rider's Call =

Novel by Kristen Britain

- First edition
- Author: Kristen Britain
- Cover artist: Keith Parkinson
- Language: English
- Series: Green Rider (series)
- Genre: Epic fantasy
- Publisher: DAW Books
- Publication date: August 5, 2003
- Publication place: United States
- Media type: Print (hardback)
- Pages: 656
- ISBN: 0-88677-861-1
- OCLC: 52710387
- Preceded by: Green Rider
- Followed by: The High King's Tomb

First Rider's Call (2003) is the second novel written by Kristen Britain and is the second book in its series.

== Plot summary ==
Now a Green Rider, one of the king's elite troop of messengers, Karigan returns to Sacor City, giving up her merchant lifestyle. The story opens a year into this service as danger is threatening the kingdom of Sacoridia once again. The dark magic in Blackveil Forest is restless, and has found an outlet through the breach in the D'Yer Wall, which has protected Sacoridia from the forest for over 1000 years. This influx of magic has interfered with a land that has largely learned to live without magic during this time. Reports of strange instances of animals turned to stone and entire villages disappearing are brought to the palace from around the country. In the end the strange magic touches even the main city as suits of iron are brought to life and snow falls within the castle. Even the Green Riders' magic is affected, sending Captain Mapstone into self-imposed solitary confinement. As a result, Mara, another rider, and Karigan are left to lead the riders as best they can. Throughout the book Karigan has ghostly visions of Lil Ambriodhe, First Rider, legendary founder of the Green Rider messenger service.

Karigan meets with an Eletian prince and learns that she has wild magic within her that entered her as a result of her battle with Shawdell in the previous book. This wild magic augments her rider ability and allows her to travel through time, even visiting Lil Ambriodhe in her own time. Unfortunately, the magic also allows Mornhavon the Black to possess her. However, Karigan uses this to her favor---while Mornhavon possesses her, she transports him into the future, and, with the help of Lil Ambriodhe, she deposits him there. This buys the defenders of Sacoridia time to prepare for Mornhavon's return.

With the weakening of the wall, Mornhavon's spirit reawakens in Blackveil Forest and begins to control the forest. Alton D'Yer is sent to fix the wall, but is betrayed by Seargent Uxton and knocked over the side of the wall into Blackveil. Mornhavon then possesses Alton and tricks him into singing the song that would destroy the D'Yer Wall, keeping him imprisoned. Mornhavon also raises two lieutenants from his army from the dead but they are later destroyed.

Excerpts woven throughout the book are entries from the journal of Hadriax el Fex. Hadriax El Fex was Mornhavon's right-hand man and best friend. From the journals the reader learns that Mornhavon was once Alessandros del Mornhavon, a prince of a foreign land called Arcosia. He comes to Sacoridia to conquer the land and harvest the land's magic to prove himself to his father. He destroys the Eletian city of Argenthythe and many of the human cities. He is met with resistance and the war drags on for many years, becoming the Long War referred to in the book. Losing contact with his father and the empire of Arcosia, he feels abandoned by his father, driving his quest for ultimate power. He conducts experiments to increase his power and make a foul weapon called the Black Star. Hadriax increasingly dislikes the Long War and Mornhavon's experiments. It all becomes too much for Hadriax when Mornhavon sacrifices one of his elite units to power the Black Star. Hadriax joins the Sacoridian league and helps in the Eletian King's defeat of Mornhavon in the final battle of the long war. Karigan receives a copy of Hadriax's journal from Estral, who finds it in the archives in Selium. From the journal, Karigan learns that Hadriax had changed his name to Hadriax G'ladheon and that he is Karigan's ancestor.

Overall the book more fully develops the characters met in the first book and introduces new characters that further the plot.

== Characters in "Green Rider" ==
- Karigan G'ladheon is the protagonist of the Green Rider book series. She displays a strong sense of loyalty throughout all three books. First, by risking her life to continue F'ryan's mission and honor his request. It is hinted that King Zachary and she are developing a relationship. Among the Green Riders, the King's messengers, Karigan is fairly well liked and has many friends, two of which flirt with her and remove her boots, as well as drawing her a bath, when she comes back from intense training with the Swordmaster.
- Lil Ambriodhe was the legendary First Rider. It is revealed in First Rider's Call that she was carrying the king's child. However, she apparently had a miscarriage and lost too much blood to live. Lil shows determination and has a slightly comical, exasperated personality, even if she is but a ghost. Karigan is favored by Lil, and Lil even goes so far as to possess her to save her from an evil force, and nearly kills her in the process.

== See also ==
- Green Rider - first book of the Green Rider Series
- First Rider's Call – Second book of the "Green Rider" series
- The High King's Tomb – Third book of the "Green Rider" series
- Blackveil – Fourth book of the "Green Rider" series
- Mirror Sight – Fifth book of the "Green Rider" series
- Firebrand - Sixth book of the "Green Rider" series
