= The Daily Signal =

Conservative media outlet based in Washington, D.C.

- Website type: News and opinion website
- Available in: English
- Headquarters: Washington, D.C.
- Editors: Katrina Trinko, editor-in-chief
- President: Robert Bluey
- Website: www.dailysignal.com
- Launched: 2014; 12 years ago
- Current status: Active

The Daily Signal is an American conservative news and commentary website founded in June 2014. It focuses on politics, policy, and culture and offers political commentary from a conservative perspective.

The Daily Signal was a project of the Heritage Foundation, a Washington, D.C.-based conservative think tank from the time of its launch in 2014 until 2024, when it became an independent publication with its own board of directors and leadership.

== Content ==
The website reports on American politics and public policy issues, both foreign and domestic, with a focus on stories it believes to be unreported or under-reported. One month before it was launched, the Heritage Foundation claimed that the site would publish nonpartisan news reporting and conservative commentary. It was created as an attempt to remedy what the organization saw as a lack of original reporting on public policy issues from understaffed publications.

The Daily Signal includes an opinion section geared toward millennials that features conservative commentary. Entertainment and sports stories that relate to politics are also published by the site.

== Leadership ==
Katrina Trinko, a former National Review political reporter, is The Daily Signal's editor-in-chief. Robert Bluey, a former Human Events editor, Media Research Center reporter, is the president and executive editor of The Daily Signal. Tyler O'Neil, a former Fox News editor, is the managing editor.

== History under The Heritage Foundation ==
Prior to starting The Daily Signal, The Heritage Foundation ran two digital publications: The Foundry, a blog, and Townhall, a news and opinion site. In 2005, Townhall was acquired by Salem Communications, and The Foundry was phased out in preparation for The Daily Signal, which began in May 2014.

The Heritage Foundation founded The Daily Signal as a digital-only news and commentary website. Atlantic Media Strategies was hired to design the site for mobile phones and tablets. Kelly McBride, a media ethicist at the Poynter Institute, said The Daily Signal could never be credible for liberal readers, but could reach an undecided audience, so long as the publication removed political agenda and published quality work from trained journalists.

The site officially launched the following month, in June 2014. Debut stories included an interview with then Kansas Governor Sam Brownback about federal health care law's effects on his state, and an account of a trip to the Korean Demilitarized Zone by Jim DeMint, then president of The Heritage Foundation.

The Daily Signal was funded entirely by The Heritage Foundation through June 3, 2024, when it became independent. The publication's initial annual budget was US$1 million.

When the site launched in 2014, it had a staff of 12 plus freelance reporters.
