= Mirror Sight =

2014 novel by Kristen Britain

- First edition
- Author: Kristen Britain
- Cover artist: Donato Giancola
- Language: English
- Series: Green Rider (series)
- Genre: Epic fantasy
- Publisher: DAW Books
- Publication date: 2014
- Publication place: United States
- Media type: Print (hardback)
- Pages: 775
- ISBN: 978-0-7564-0879-4
- Preceded by: Blackveil
- Followed by: Firebrand

Mirror Sight by Kristen Britain is a fantasy novel from 2014, the fifth book in the Green Rider series.

== Plot ==
In the heart of Blackveil in the castle Argenthyne, Karigan is confronted by a mysterious figure wearing a mirrored looking mask. To prevent Mornhavon the Black from possessing such a powerful magical item she shatters it and is propelled into darkness. She awakens to find herself sealed within a stone sarcophagus, delirious she fights to break out, desperately starved of air she starts to fall unconscious only to be released from the tomb into the bright lights and loud music of a circus stage. She staggers from the arena and through a dark city completely disoriented, she is set upon by a rowdy bunch of thugs but makes quick work of them with her bonewood staff. An unexpected ally arrives but before she agrees to go with him to a safe haven she is drugged and whisked away.

When Karigan awakes, she has various injuries including a broken arm and can barely walk. Promptly a housekeeper informs her that this is her 'uncle's' house and she is safe and should rest. Her uncle it transpires is a professor of archaeology from high society and has no idea that his new house guest is a real life artifact. Soon it is revealed to her that she has been transported nearly 200 years into the future. Karigan no longer recognizes the city - an industrial revolution is underway, with gas lighting, steam engines, factories belching smoke, cotton mills run on slave labor and curious animatronic law enforcers. With women forced to cover their faces and not speak unless instructed, Karigan struggles to fit into her role in this new society.

One of her Eletian companions, from her mission to Blackveil was also pulled through time, however Lhean is weakened by the lack of magic in the world. He is captured and taken to be presented to the Emperor as Eletians were believed to be extinct having been hunted and killed during the fall of Sacoridia nearly 200 years ago.

Karigan convinces the professor and his assistant Cade Harlow that she is in fact the real Sir Karigan G'ladheon from 200 years in their history. The professor explains that all knowledge of the empires history is restricted, and that the emperor who now rules is merciless, powerful and immortal. They reveal they are part of the resistance to bring down the empire and restore a monarch to the throne. They also explain that Arhys, a young girl the professor employs as a maid is the last living descendant of King Zachary and that she is unaware of her royal bloodline. Finally the professor confesses that Cade is in training to become Arhys' bodyguard, a new generation of Weapon.

Arhys becomes jealous of the professors new found interest in Karigan, and the young girl reports the strange nocturnal activity of the professor to the authorities. The professor's secret underground museum and training facility is breached by the law enforcers and in a desperate bid to buy Karigan and Cade time to escape, the professor blows up the entire complex including himself.

Karigan catches the interest of the professor's rival Dr. Silk, a cruel and ambitious man. His aim is to curry favor with the emperor and earn himself eternal life. Learning of Lhean's fate, Karigan travels with Cade and Luke, a former groomsmen of the late professor, to the new capital to rescue him. At their arrival of the palace they are immediately captured, Luke is killed, Cade imprisoned and Karigan strikes a bargain with Dr. Silk to ensure Cade's well-being before his inevitable execution. In the depths of the palace, Cade is shown a woman, known as The Witch, she has been mutilated and tortured for centuries by the emperor's preferred inner circle, he is warned that should he not cooperate this will be Karigan's fate.

Karigan comes face to face with the Emperor who is none other than King Zachary's cousin Xandis Amberhill. She realizes however it is not just Amberhill residing within his body and that there are two other personalities fighting for dominance. She is forced to placate his more aggressive personas and duel the emperor's personal bodyguard, The Eternal Guardian. The Eternal Guardian reveals himself to Karigan as Fastion, King Zachary's sworn Weapon, who was killed only to be reanimated by Mornhaven to serve for eternity. With Fastion's help she is able to free Lhean and Cade, who in turn releases The Witch. All hell breaks loose as the witch, once free, is returned to full power as Yolande the sea goddess, who floods the country in revenge for her imprisonment. Karigan is able to cross the threshold of the world and travel back in time with Lhean, however as she tries to bring Cade with her she is prevented and Cade releases her so that she can safely return home.

Karigan returns to her own time with the knowledge from the future that Xandis Amberhill will bring about the doom of Sacoridia. And that their only hope is to find a mysterious 'Dragonfly' device that may help stand against his unimaginable power.

== See also ==
- Green Rider - First book of the Green Rider Series
- First Rider's Call - Second book of the Green Rider Series
- The High King's Tomb – Third book of the "Green Rider" series
- Blackveil - Fourth book of the Green Rider Series
- Mirror Sight - Fifth book of the Green Rider series
- Firebrand - Sixth book of the "Green Rider" series
