= Terra Holdings =

American real estate broker

Terra Holdings, founded in 1995, is a parent company of several previously acquired real estate brokerage firms that focus on real estate in the New York City and Manhattan area. The company was established in 1995 and has since acquired Brown Harris Stevens, Feathered Nest, and Halstead Property. Headquartered at 770 Lexington Avenue, it also has a service arm known as the Vanderbilt Companies that focus on insurance, appraisals, advertising, and marketing.

Co-chairmen and owners of Terra Holdings are David Burris, Kent Swig, descendant of the Swig real estate family; and Arthur and William Lie Zeckendorf, scions of the Zeckendorf real estate dynasty, and principals of Zeckendorf Realty. Arthur's son, Arthur III is the fourth generation to join the family firm.

In June 2017, they purchased the cooperative and condominium management division (with 8,250 units in 35 buildings in New York) from Rose Associates.
