= Green Rider =

Novel by Kristen Britain

- First edition
- Author: Kristen Britain
- Cover artist: Keith Parkinson
- Language: English
- Series: Green Rider
- Genre: Epic fantasy
- Publisher: DAW Books
- Publication date: November 1998
- Publication place: United States
- Media type: Print (Hardback)
- Pages: 504
- ISBN: 0-88677-824-7
- OCLC: 39980147
- Dewey Decimal: 813/.54 21
- LC Class: PS3552.R4964 G74 1998
- Followed by: First Rider's Call

Green Rider (titled The Green Rider in some later printings) is the first novel written by Kristen Britain and is the first book in its series. It was nominated for the Crawford Award in 1999.

== Plot summary ==
Karigan G'ladheon, a merchant's daughter, is cast out of her school in Selium by Dean Geyer following a duel in which she bested a wealthy aristocrat.

Running away from the shame of her expulsion, she travels into the forest called the Green Cloak. She meets a Green Rider (one of a group of legendary elite messengers in the king's service) who is dying with two black arrows protruding from his back. The Green Rider, F'ryan Coblebay, makes Karigan swear to carry a message to Sacor City for the 'love of her country', and there to deliver it into the hands of either Laren, the Captain of the Green Riders, or the king himself. He also orders Karigan not to read the letter for the sake of her life. Coblebay entrusts a second more private letter to her care also. As his life passes, he whispers with his last breath; "beware the shadow man...". She also takes the gold winged horse brooch that is the symbol of his office as a Green Rider.

Karigan, following her promise, rides the horse, which she calls "Horse" (whose real name is Condor), to Sacor City through perilous paths. Horse appears to have an uncanny ability to evade the various dangers Karigan encounters, always delivering Karigan to safety. During the journey, she meets many people, including the Berry sisters, members of the mystical, elf-like race of Eletians, and two traitorous Weapons (a special rank given only to the bodyguards of the king). Throughout her journey, the ghost of F'ryan Coblebay follows her, urging her on and providing help when desperately needed.

When she reaches Sacor City, she is hailed as a Green Rider, and she delivers both letters. The second seemingly less important letter, which Karigan felt justified in reading as it was not addressed to the king, was a love letter to the beautiful Lady Estora.

Karigan delivers the letter from F'ryan Coblebay but to everyone's dismay the letter appears to contain nothing of any importance. The Lady Estora, confused by inaccuracies in the letter delivered to her, approaches Karigan; who then takes the letter to Laren for closer inspection. The love letter is decoded to reveal a plot by his brother Amilton and one of the clan chiefs to kill King Zachary. Amilton, the elder brother of Zachary, was denied the throne due to his dishonorable character and eventually even lost the right to rule over the family province of Hillander due to his shameful behaviour.

There follows a desperate battle as Shawdell, an Eletian who has infiltrated the king's court and gained the trust of the crown, is revealed as the Shadowman F'ryan Coblebay warned Karigan of. During a dangerous battle Karigan, with the help of ghosts, wounds the rogue Eletian and he disappears. After the battle, it is discovered that Amilton, Zachary's disinherited older brother, has stolen into the castle and taken over. An elaborate and daring plan allows Karigan, along with the King and his retinue, to enter the castle through the underground tombs. Once inside, they make their way to the throne room and confront Prince Amilton. Shawdell (the rogue Eletian/Shadowman) has merged with Amilton and is taking him over. At this point, Karigan almost manages to sever the connection between Amilton and Shawdell and is transported to an in-between place where she manages to defeat Shawdell/Amilton and save the kingdom. After recovering from the ordeal, she goes home with her father, vowing to follow in his footsteps and become a merchant, leaving behind service as a Green Rider.

== Characters ==
- Karigan G'ladheon – The daughter of merchant Stevic G'ladheon, and a green rider. She finds F'Ryan Cobblebay, a dying rider, and takes over his message errand, helping to defeat Shawdell and Amilton. She is in love with King Zachary.
- F'Ryan Coblebay – the Green Rider who died while trying to get an important message to King Zachary. Karigan G'ladheon found him dying on the road with two arrows in his back and agreed to carry on his mission for him. He fought the power of Shawdell the Eletian to help his message arrive successfully, and appears as a ghost to Karigan in Green Rider with two arrows in his back that are said to cause him constant, unbearable pain. He helps the other ghosts of previous Green Riders and Karigan with the Wild Ride. Karigan breaks the arrows that were in the back of his body and frees him from the service of Shawdell the Eletian.
- Alton - 'Lord Alton D'yer' is the heir to the Clan of D'yer and a Green Rider. He was one of the few Riders to talk to Karigan after she arrived in Sacor City with F'ryan's message. Because of his aristocratic heritage, Alton has been forbidden from partaking in the usual message errands of the Riders as it is too dangerous. At the Battle of the Lost Lake, he found out that his Green Rider ability is that of a walled shield. He is in love with Karigan.
- King Zachary - 'King Zachary Hillander' is the current high king of Sacoridia. He is the youngest son of the late High King Amigast Hillander who named Zachary his heir over his older son, Amilton Hillander. King Zachary wished to spend his days as Lord-Governor of the seaside Hillander Province but takes his role as king of Sacoridia seriously. His kingship was threatened by the coalition of Shawdell the Eletian, former Lord-Governor Tomas Mirwell, and his brother Amilton Hillander. With the help of Karigan G'ladheon, his Black Shields, other Green Riders and the Lord and Lady Governor's of Sacoridia, he kept his crown. He is in love with Karigan, feelings she returns. He is engaged to Lady Estora.
- Lady Estora – Aristocrat and lover of the deceased F'ryan Coblebay. Good friend of Karigan.
- The Berry sisters – 'Miss Bayberry and Miss Bunchberry' – These two eccentric sisters live in the manor Seven Chimneys that their father Professor Berry built so he could study the arcane arts. All of their servants are invisible, after a spell of their father's went wrong. They provide Karigan a place to stay after a close call with Captain Immerez. They also give her a moonstone with which she defeats Shawdell the Eletian, and help her better understand her winged horse brooch. In The High King's Tomb, their house is destroyed when a bottled ship grows in size after the bottle breaks.
- Arms master Rendle – Arms Master Rendle is Karigan's sword teacher. After she defeats Timas Mirwell in a bout of swordplay, he offers to take her on as his personal student. He defends her case in front of the Trustees so she does not have to leave school. She ends up being expelled anyway. He allows her to become a swordmaster trainee to Arms master Drent.
- Abram Rust the Axe Man – Abram Rust is the king's forester. Nowadays he spends more time defending the king's trees than cutting them. He assists Karigan on her journey to North. He also tells her of an inn where she will be able to stay without fear of robbery.
- Jendara and Torne - Jendara and Torne are the personal Weapons to Prince Amilton. Torne is killed by Karigan in her escape. Jendara dies when Amilton attempts to overthrow Zachary. She is killed by the Weapons after she kills their teacher Devon.
- Garroty - Mercenary for the company, The Talons. He joins Jendara and Torne after they have captured Karigan on the road. When Jendara and Torne both leave the camp he attempts to rape Karigan but is defeated when Karigan headbutts him in the face, fracturing his nose and knocking pieces of it into his brain, thus killing him.
- Amilton - Prince Amilton is King Zachary's brother. He was supposed to inherit the throne but his father passed it on to Zachary. He attempts to overthrow Zachary with the help of Shawdell the Eletian, but is thwarted.
- Immerez - Captain of the Mirwellian militia, later part of Second Empire. Sent to waylay Coblebay's message.
- Shawdell – He is the Eletian who attempted to bring down the D'yer wall. He also aided Amilton in his quest for power. He tried to trick Karigan into helping his cause. They fought each other and the Lost Lake and Karigan won but her moonstone shattered in the fight.
- Captain Laren Mapstone – Elder captain of the Green Riders and adoptive mother of Melry Exiter. Firm in her belief of discipline and order, she manages the Riders accordingly.
- Sevano – Cargo Master for Stevic G'ladheon. He taught Karigan self-defense so she wouldn't be hurt. He also taught her rudimentary swordplay.
- Estral – Estral Andovian is the best friend of Karigan. She is also the daughter of the Golden Guardian, Aaron Fiori. Estral is deaf in one ear but claims it makes her a better minstrel. She always beats Karigan in the game of Intrigue but only because Karigan never tries.
- Stevic G'ladheon – The father of the headstrong Karigan. He grew up fishing on a small island but got tired of the life and came to make a better life. He is now one of the wealthiest merchants in all of Sacoridia.

== See also ==
- Green Rider - First book of the Green Rider Series
- First Rider's Call – Second book of the "Green Rider" series
- The High King's Tomb – Third book of the "Green Rider" series
- Blackveil – Fourth book of the "Green Rider" series
- Mirror Sight – Fifth book of the "Green Rider" series
- Firebrand - Sixth book of the "Green Rider" series
- Winterlight - Seventh book of the “Green Rider” series
- Falling in a Sea of Stars - Eighth book of the “Green Rider” series
