= Kristen Britain =

American author (born 1965)

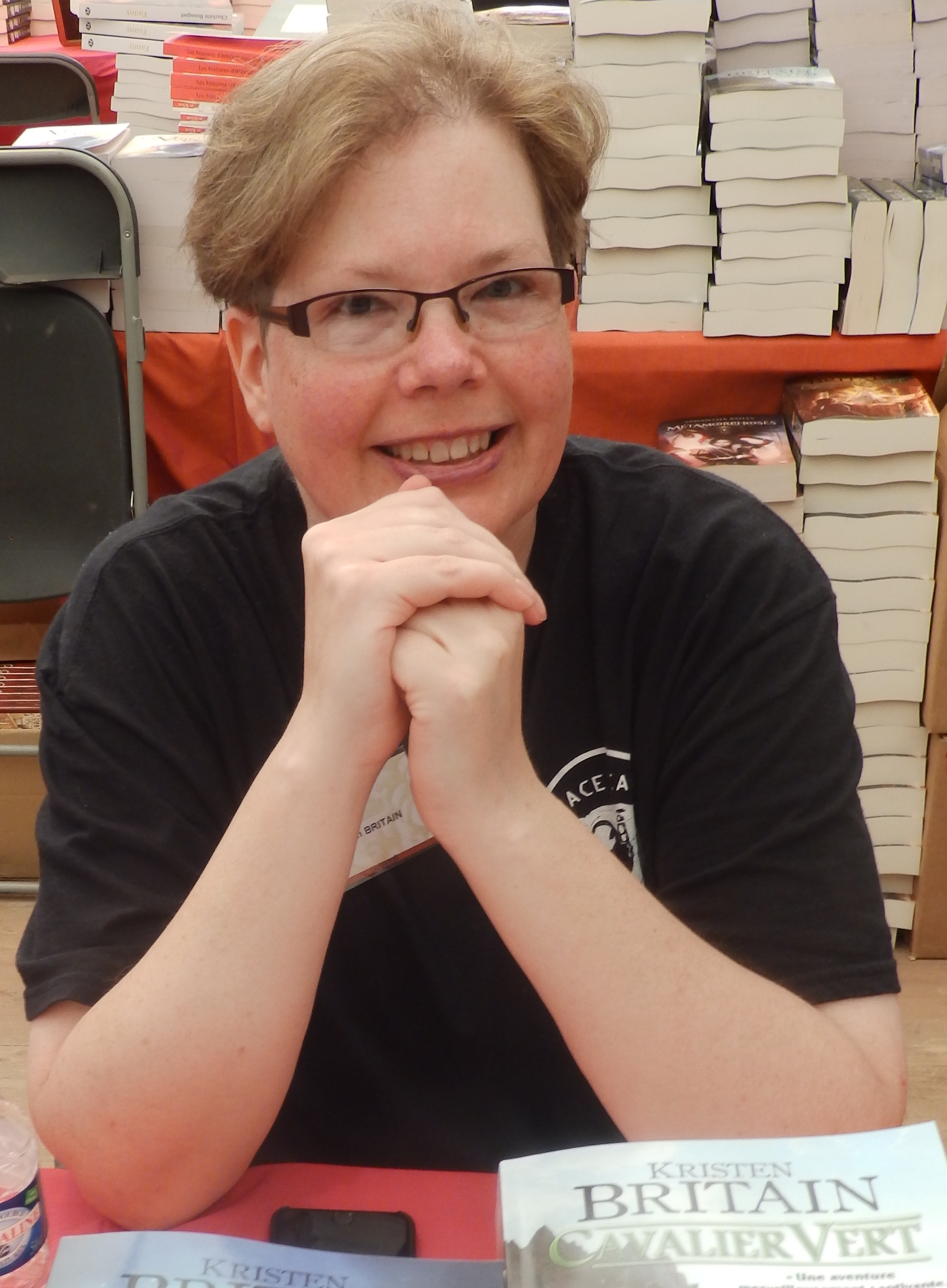
- Born: October 18, 1965 (age 61)
- Education: Ithaca College
- Occupation: Author
- Website: kristenbritain.com

Kristen Britain (born October 18, 1965) is an American author. She is the author of the fantasy series Green Rider which includes the eponymous first volume (nominated for the Crawford Award), First Rider's Call, The High King's Tomb, Blackveil (nominated for the David Gemmell Legend Award), and Mirror Sight.

== Early life and education ==
Britain grew up in the Finger Lakes region of New York State, where she started her first novel — an undersea fantasy featuring herself and her friends — at the age of nine. She published her first book, a cartoon collection called Horses and Horsepeople, at the age of thirteen.

After completing her degree in film production, with a minor in writing, at Ithaca College in 1987, she went to work for the National Park Service in 1988 after a conversation with a park ranger during a visit to Women's Rights National Historical Park.

Britain currently resides in Maine.

== Career ==
Her first ranger job was a seasonal position at Clara Barton National Historic Site in Maryland. At the time of the publication of her first novel, Green Rider, she was working full-time as a park ranger at Acadia National Park, and she drew much of the inspiration for the landscape of Sacoridia from the park. Her many years as a park ranger enabled her to work in a variety of natural and historical settings, from 300 feet below the surface of the Earth to 13,000 feet above sea level on the Continental Divide; and from the textile mills of the American Industrial Revolution to the homes of Americans who changed the course of history.

Kristen Britain's first novel, Green Rider, was published by DAW Books in November 1998. It was acclaimed as an influential work of fantasy fiction and nominated for the Locus Award for Best First Novel and the William L. Crawford - IAFA Fantasy Award, or Crawford Award. Green Rider introduces us to Karigan, "a young woman who went from being expelled from school to entering a world filled with dangerous magic." The book grew into a series of nine books (as of 2024) comprising an epic fantasy adventure based in a medieval world called Sacoridia.

== Published works ==
=== Green Rider series ===
- Green Rider (1998, ISBN 0-88677-858-1 US paperback; ISBN 0-671-03303-4 UK paperback)
- First Rider's Call (2003, ISBN 0-7564-0193-3 US paperback; ISBN 0-7434-0894-2 UK paperback) (initial working title was Mirror of the Moon)
- The High King's Tomb (2007, ISBN 0-7564-0266-2)
- Blackveil (2011, ISBN 978-0-7564-0660-8, hardcover)
- Mirror Sight (2014, ISBN 978-0-7564-0879-4, hardcover)
- Firebrand (2017, ISBN 978-0-7564-0880-0, hardcover)
- The Dream Gatherer (2018, ISBN 978-0-7564-1496-2, hardcover); collection of Green Rider short fiction
- Winterlight (2021, ISBN 978-0-7564-0881-7, hardcover)
- Spirit of the Wood (2023, ISBN 978-0-7564-1871-7, hardcover); Green Rider novella / short novel
- Falling in a Sea of Stars (2025, ISBN 978-0-7564-0882-4, hardcover)

=== Short stories ===
- Linked, on the Lake of Souls in DAW 30th Anniversary Anthology: Fantasy 2003
- Avalonia Out Of Avalon 2001
- Justine and the Mountie in Imaginary Friends 2008
- Chafing the Bogey Man in Misspelled 2008
