= Tish Rabe =

American writer

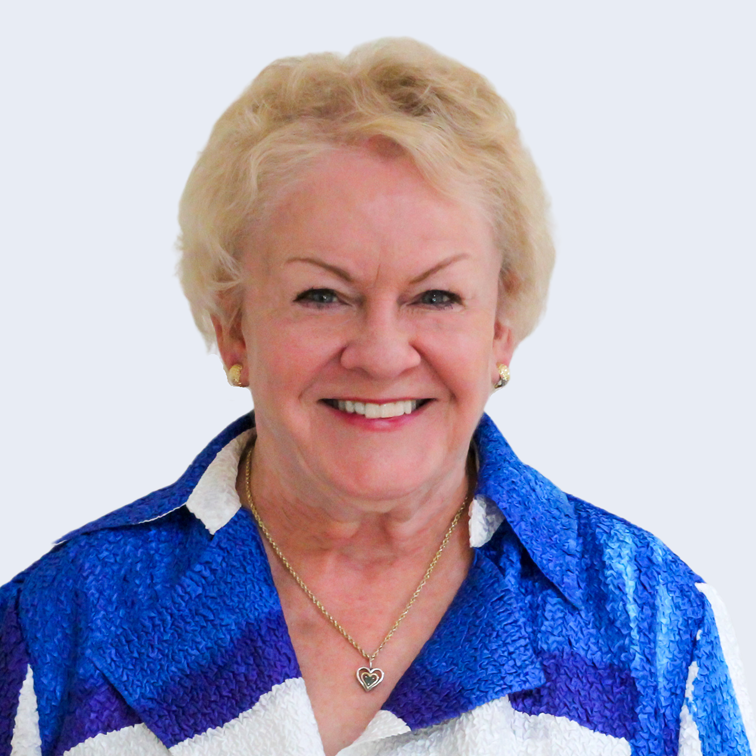
- Tish Rabe in 2023
- Born: July 24, 1951 (age 75)
- Education: Ithaca College

Tish Rabe is a children's book author who lives in New York City, New York and Mystic, Connecticut. She has written or adapted more than 40 Dr. Seuss books since Seuss's death.

== Career ==
Rabe has written over 135 children's books, including titles for Sesame Street, Blue's Clues, Clifford the Big Red Dog, Bear in the Big Blue House and Curious George. In 1996 she began writing The Cat in the Hat's Learning Library, a new series of non-fiction science books for early readers.

Her books include Oh, Baby, the Places You'll Go!, which is meant to be read in utero, and eleven other titles that present science concepts to early readers.

Her book My Oh My—A Butterfly! was named by the Bank Street College of Education as one of the 40 best books for children in 2007. Her story for Nick Jr. Magazine, "The Best Dressed Guest," won the Distinguished Achievement Award from the Association of Educational Publishers.

Rabe has also written scripts for several children's television series, including Clifford, Clifford's Puppy Days, I Spy and The Country Mouse and the City Mouse Adventures.

As both a songwriter and music producer, she has created children's songs that have been broadcast on PBS Kids, Fox, Nickelodeon and HBO Family.

Rabe is a graduate of Ithaca College.
