= List of Clifford the Big Red Dog episodes =

This is a list of episodes of Clifford the Big Red Dog. During the course of the series, 65 episodes of Clifford the Big Red Dog aired over two seasons.

== Series overview ==
Season	Segments	Episodes	Originally released	
Season	Segments	Episodes	First released	Last released
1	80	40	September 4, 2000	December 5, 2001
2	50	26	February 12, 2002	February 25, 2003

== Episodes ==
=== Season 1 (2000–01) ===
No. overall	No. in season	Title	Written by	Storyboarded by	Original release date
1	1	"My Best Friend"	Sindy McKay	Joseph Orrantia	September 4, 2000
1	1	"Cleo's Fair Share"	Sindy McKay	Jeff Gordon	September 4, 2000
"My Best Friend": Emily-Elizabeth decides that she must find something "special" for Show and Tell. Jetta keeps scorning her many attempts although. But after an exhaustive search of Birdwell Island for the perfect thing to share, Emily-Elizabeth learns that sometimes the best things in life are right under her nose.; "Cleo's Fair Share": Cleo gets a new toy and doesn't want to share it with anyone. Cleo learns it's not as much fun playing with a new toy without your friends.
2	2	"Special Delivery"	Larry Swerdlove	Marc Schirmeister	September 5, 2000
2	2	"A Ferry Tale"	Sindy McKay	Marty Murphy	September 5, 2000
"Special Delivery": Clifford accidentally breaks a present he was supposed to deliver for Emily-Elizabeth, then allows Cleo to convince him to try and hide the fact from Emily-Elizabeth. Clifford learns that it's best to be honest, right from the start.; "A Ferry Tale": After Emily-Elizabeth grooms Clifford in preparation for Prize Pooch Magazine's "Dog of the Year" contest, he is expected to "stay clean" until the contest judge arrives. Clifford struggles to stay clean, but getting dirty gets the better of him. In the end, Clifford learns that Emily-Elizabeth loves him-- clean or dirty!
3	3	"And Birdy Makes Three"	Dev Ross	Joseph Orrantia	September 6, 2000
3	3	"The Titanic Tower"	Dennis Haley and Marcy Brown	Marty Murphy	September 6, 2000
"And Birdy Makes Three": Emily-Elizabeth finds a baby bird and has to take care of her until she can learn to fly. This doesn't leave her much time to play with Clifford. Clifford learns that even when she's busy with other things, Emily-Elizabeth never stops loving him.; "The Titanic Tower": Emily-Elizabeth feels a little jealous that Jetta gets to go see the amazing Titanic Tower in the exciting big city. Emily-Elizabeth learns that there are some pretty amazing things right in her own backyard. Meanwhile, Jetta's trip does not go as well as planned.
4	4	"Clifford's Carnival"	John Semper, Jr.	Marty Murphy	September 7, 2000
4	4	"Clifford's Doggy Reunion"	Larry Swerdlove	Jeff Gordon	September 7, 2000
"Clifford's Carnival": Everyone, including Clifford, must work as a team to put on this year's Fall Carnival. But it isn't fair that Jetta sees herself as more of a "boss" than a team player. Jetta learns the importance of doing your part as a member of a "team."; "Clifford's Doggy Reunion": Clifford and Emily-Elizabeth are excited -- Cousin Laura and her dog Rex are coming to visit! They haven't seen each other since Clifford was a little puppy! When they arrive, however, Clifford and Emily-Elizabeth learn that people change and adjustments have to be made in a relationship.
5	5	"The Great Race"	Dev Ross	Joseph Orrantia	September 8, 2000
5	5	"Tummy Trouble"	Lois Becker & Mark Stratton	Marc Schirmeister	September 8, 2000
"The Great Race": T-Bone finds himself in a contest with Mac. T-Bone learns that you don't have to win to feel good -- you just have to do your very best. He ends up winning because Mac cheated.; "Tummy Trouble": The dogs convince themselves that it's okay to keep eating treats as long as they've done something "special" to deserve them. All 3 learn that too much of a good thing can be bad.
6	6	"Cleo Comes to Town"	Sindy McKay	Cynthia Petrovic	September 11, 2000
6	6	"False Friends"	Kati Rocky	Charles Visser	September 11, 2000
"Cleo Comes to Town": In this flashback episode the audience sees how Cleo shook things up when she first moved to the island. T-Bone learns to accept a new friend in the neighborhood and also how to share an old friend with a new one.; "False Friends": Cleo gets a new doggie playground and suddenly Mac is her new best friend -- and she starts ignoring Clifford and T-Bone! Cleo learns that good friends stick by you through thick and thin.
7	7	"Jane and the Beanstalk"	Baz Hawkins	Joseph Orrantia	September 12, 2000
7	7	"An Itchy Patch"	Anne-Marie Perrota & Tean Schultz	Marty Murphy	September 12, 2000
"Jane and the Beanstalk": Emily-Elizabeth works hard to prepare tor her audition for the lead in the school play, but loses the role to Jetta. But Jetta becomes so smug about her talents and being the role, that she doesn't practice or learn her lines. So Emily-Elizabeth steps in to play the lead role at the last minute -- and Jetta learns the hard way that hard work and preparation are the things that make you successful. NOTE: This is the only episode where Clifford cries.; "An Itchy Patch": Clifford can't stop scratching. He is itching like crazy but tries his best to stop when he hears Emily-Elizabeth say that she'll have to take him to the vet if he keeps it up. With the help of Cleo and T-Bone, Clifford tries every solution in order to stop itching and conceal his discomfort to avoid a trip to the doctor! Clifford learns the importance of trust when going into an unknown situation.
8	8	"A New Friend"	Larry Swerdlove	Jeff Gordon	September 13, 2000
8	8	"Stormy Weather"	Dev Ross	Marty Murphy	September 13, 2000
"A New Friend": There is a new dog in town -- and he only has 3 legs. Clifford, Cleo and T-Bone learn that people with different abilities want to be friends and that they are able to do many things without anyone's help. Then K.C. becomes a good friend!; "Stormy Weather": Clifford's talent for digging seems to be disruptive to everyone in town. But when a big storm comes in, his deficit becomes an asset. Clifford learns that there's an appropriate time and place for talents to be expressed.
9	9	"Circus Stars"	Dennis Haley & Marcy Brown	Joseph Orrantia	September 14, 2000
9	9	"Limelight Fright"	Sheryl Scarborough & Kayte Kuch	Marc Schirmeister	September 14, 2000
"Circus Stars": When Clifford's hero, Gordo the elephant, star of the circus, comes down with a cold, Clifford volunteers to step in and help out. Starstruck Clifford learns that "stars" are just regular people and, like everyone else, they sometimes need a helping hand.; "Limelight Fright": Emily-Elizabeth and Charley recruit the dogs to help them with a show and scene-stealing Cleo is surprised to discover she has stage fright, but Cleo learns that the support of good friends can help you work through a problem.
10	10	"To Catch a Bird"	Meg McLaughlin	Charles Visser	September 15, 2000
10	10	"The Best Party Ever"	Dean Stefan	Cynthia Petrovic	September 15, 2000
"To Catch a Bird": When Jetta's medal and mirror go missing, all fingers and paws point to Emily-Elizabeth – all of them except for Clifford's! When the dogs finally prove Emily-Elizabeth didn't steal anything, and that a seagull took it, Clifford learns the value of having faith in a friend.; "The Best Party Ever": Jetta ridicules Emily-Elizabeth for not planning enough exciting activities for her "homemade" birthday party. Assuming that Jetta doesn't want to come to the party, Charley convinces Emily-Elizabeth not to invite her. But Emily-Elizabeth exercises compassion when she realizes that Jetta's feelings were hurt and ends up inviting her after all.
11	11	"Come Back, Mac"	Anne-Marie Perrotta & Tean Schultz	Jeff Gordon	September 18, 2000
11	11	"Boo!"	Lois Becker & Mark Stratton	Marty Murphy	September 18, 2000
"Come Back, Mac": Mac tears one of Jetta's favorite sweaters and feels so terrible he runs away, leaving Jetta heartbroken. He is afraid to come home, but Clifford and friends seek him out and convince him to return. Mac learns that he's more important to Jetta than her sweater, and that facing up to your deeds is the wise thing to do.; "Boo!": It's Halloween and Jetta can't stop bragging about how brave she is. When the whole town gets a little spooked after watching a scary "ghost" movie together, Jetta learns that it's okay to have fears.
12	12	"Little Clifford"	Baz Hawkins	Cynthia Petrovic	September 19, 2000
12	12	"Welcome to Birdwell Island"	Dev Ross	Marty Murphy	September 19, 2000
"Little Clifford": Emily-Elizabeth tells how she and Clifford got together and how Emily-Elizabeth's unconditional love changed the "runt" of the litter into the biggest dog around.; "Welcome to Birdwell Island": This flashback episode tells the story of the day when the Howards moved to Birdwell Island. The town is full of preconceived ideas about how "a big dog can mean big problems", but they soon learn that Clifford has much to offer and they shouldn't make assumptions before they know the facts.
13	13	"Doing the Right Thing"	Baz Hawkins	Marc Schirmeister	September 20, 2000
13	13	"The Dog Who Cried Woof"	Anne-Marie Perrotta & Tean Schultz	Tom Ellery	September 20, 2000
"Doing the Right Thing": When T-Bone inadvertently steals a squeak toy, he experiences a guilt-induced nightmare where his conscience shows him the right thing to do. T-Bone learns that it's always best to just do the right thing.; "The Dog Who Cried Woof": After overhearing Samuel tell the kids a scary story about Whiffy the Skunk Ghost, Clifford and T-Bone get a bit spooked. Cleo takes the opportunity to play a series of tricks on them, but finds them not believing her when she really needs them after getting stuck on a bush and sprayed by a real skunk. She learns that it isn't nice to play tricks on people.
14	14	"Leaf of Absence"	Scott Guy	S.O.B.	September 21, 2000
14	14	"Nobody's Perfect"	Sheryl Scarborough & Kayte Kuch	Phil Mosnes	September 21, 2000
"Leaf of Absence": T-Bone asks Clifford and Cleo to keep an eye on a pile of leaves he has collected, but even though he knows he shouldn't, Clifford simply can't resist jumping into them. When the wind picks up, Clifford realizes he hasn't taken the responsibility seriously enough. Clifford and Cleo spend the afternoon re-collecting the pile, and T-Bone is truly grateful when he returns to see if his leaves are okay. Clifford learns the importance of keeping a promise.; "Nobody's Perfect": It's Silly Sports Day at school and everyone is looking forward to seeing Charley master yet another athletic feat, but Charley is having a messy time trying to learn how to "Jiggly Juggle"! Charley wants to throw in the towel, but he learns that you don't have to be the best at something to enjoy doing it!
15	15	"Teacher's Pet"	Lois Becker	Jeff Gordon	September 22, 2000
15	15	"Islander of the Year"	Dennis Haley & Marcy Brown	Joseph Orrantia and S.O.B.	September 22, 2000
"Teacher's Pet": The dogs go to school for the first time and T-Bone worries that he won't be able to keep up with the rest of the class. He works hard and pays close attention to the teacher's directions, and in the end his efforts are rewarded -- as are the efforts of every member of the class as each is praised for his/her unique qualities.; "Islander of the Year": The library sponsors an essay contest for Islander of the Year and the children all submit their ideas. But somehow, as they tell their tales, Clifford keeps turning up -- and is ultimately chosen as the winner! The kids learn that sometimes a real hero is the one you least expect.
16	16	"Clifford's Big Surprise"	Sheryl Scarborough & Kayte Kuch	Enrique May	September 25, 2000
16	16	"The Ears Have It"	Bruce Talkington	Cynthia Petrovic	September 25, 2000
"Clifford's Big Surprise": Everyone is too busy to play with Clifford 1 day -- because they are too busy planning a surprise party for him! While on his own, Clifford learns that playing by yourself can be fun -- and so can having a huge party with all your friends!; "The Ears Have It": Clifford and Cleo are all excited about the town's upcoming celebration complete with fireworks! But they notice that T-Bone isn't quite as enthusiastic and soon learn that he is scared of the loud noises of all the festivities. T-Bone learns that the support of good friends can help you manage feelings of fear.
17	17	"Tough Enough"	Anne-Marie Perrotta & Tean Schultz	Enrique May	September 26, 2000
17	17	"Stars in Your Eyes"	Donna Harman	Jeff Gordon	September 26, 2000
"Tough Enough": Thinking that it'll make him more appealing to Sheriff Lewis, T-Bone decides to "toughen up." T-Bone eventually learns that it's much better to be nice than to be tough -- and everyone loves him just the way he is.; "Stars in Your Eyes": Charley gets a new telescope and offers to bring it to Emily-Elizabeth's "space" theme party. When Jetta mentions that the telescope might get damaged at the party, Charley changes his mind. Thinking that his friends won't want him at the party without his telescope, he decides to stay home. In the end, Charley realizes that his friends like him for who he is rather than what he has.
18	18	"Mac's Secret Dog Club"	Larry Swerdlove	Tom Ellery	January 15, 2001
18	18	"The Dog Park"	Pamela Hickey & Dennys McCoy	Tom Ellery	January 15, 2001
"Mac's Secret Dog Club": Mac starts a club and tries to exclude T-Bone. When Cleo and Clifford refuse to join without T-Bone, Mac gets lonely being the only member of such an "exclusive" club. Mac soon realizes that it's not fun to be left out and he opens the club to everyone.; "The Dog Park": It's a beautiful day at the park, the birds are singing, the sun is shining, and the dogs are playing -- much to Mr. Bleakman's annoyance! Mr. Bleakman manages to make the park "off limits" to dogs only to discover that he misses them when they're gone.
19	19	"Fluffed Up Cleo"	Anne-Marie Perrotta & Tean Schultz	Phillip Mosnes	January 16, 2001
19	19	"Team Spirit"	Dennis Haley & Marcy Brown	Tom Ellery	January 16, 2001
"Fluffed Up Cleo": When Cleo wins the esteemed honor of Fluffiest Dog of Birdwell Island, it's all she can talk about! Clifford and T-Bone bear with the new star, but it takes a lot of patience. When Cleo gets a dose of her own medicine from Mac, she learns that bragging all of the time can be boring -- it's okay to be proud of an accomplishment, but be careful to be respectful of others.; "Team Spirit": After Jetta tells Vaz that his poor soccer skills are holding back their team, Vaz tries to sit out the rest of the game. In the end, both Jetta and Vaz learn that being part of a team is more important than winning games.
20	20	"Clifford on Parade"	Kati Rocky	Cynthia Petrovic and S.O.B.	January 17, 2001
20	20	"Follow the Leader"	Bob Carrau	Cynthia Petrovic and S.O.B.	January 17, 2001
"Clifford on Parade": Emily-Elizabeth and Charley are having a difficult time deciding what kind of float to make for the annual Birdwell Parade. But, with a little help from Clifford, they learn the importance of compromise in making everyone happy.; "Follow the Leader": Cleo has a difficult time giving up her role as "leader" in a game of Follow the Leader, but soon learns that playing with friends is more fun when everyone cooperates and takes turns with one another.
21	21	"Good-Bye T-Bone"	Baz Hawkins	Marty Murphy	January 18, 2001
21	21	"The Truth About Dogs and Cats"	Bob Carrau	Norma Rivera-Klingler	January 18, 2001
"Good-Bye T-Bone": Clifford and Cleo misunderstand a conversation, and think that T-Bone is moving away. They vow to make T-Bone's last day on Birdwell Island extra special. Both dogs eventually learn to listen to a whole story before jumping to conclusions, but the good friends enjoy a truly special day nonetheless!; "The Truth About Dogs and Cats": When 2 cats move into the tree next door to T-Bone, the dogs try everything to get rid of them, but they soon discover that they have no real reason not to like cats. The dogs learn that, just because individuals are different, it doesn't mean they can't be friends.
22	22	"The Big Sleepover"	Larry Swerdlove	Sean Bishop	January 19, 2001
22	22	"Dog for a Day"	Scott Guy	Tom Ellery	January 19, 2001
"The Big Sleepover": Emily-Elizabeth is going off the Island for a night because her cousin is allergic to dogs and asks Charley to babysit Clifford. The day goes pretty well, but when night falls, Clifford really misses Emily-Elizabeth. The whole town bands together to get the big red dog through the night and they learn that this community has the spirit of kids that can accomplish anything if they put their minds to it!; "Dog for a Day": Fed up with his "responsibilities," Charley decides he would like to lead a dog's life -- being free from chores, school, or problems. But courtesy of a dream he learns that while being a dog is just fine, he likes being just who he is.
23	23	"T-Bone, Dog About Town"	Lois Becker and Mark Stratton	Tom Ellery	February 14, 2001
23	23	"Clifford's Big Heart"	Baz Hawkins	Sahin Ersoz	February 14, 2001
"T-Bone, Dog About Town": A cute little poodle named Mimi comes to Birdwell Island on vacation and T-Bone gets a crush. He starts trying to be the kind of dog he thinks she will like, but learns that it's always best to be yourself.; "Clifford's Big Heart": Clifford works hard to try to make Emily-Elizabeth the perfect Valentine to show her how much he loves her. In the end, he learns it's his presence, not presents, that means the most to Emily-Elizabeth.
24	24	"Who Me, Jealous?"	Scott Guy	Norma Rivera-Klingler	January 22, 2001
24	24	"A Bunny in a Haystack"	Anne-Marie Perrota and Tean Schultz	Cynthia Petrovic	January 22, 2001
"Who Me, Jealous?": Mrs. Diller is taking care of Susie, her sister's adorable little puppy, for the weekend. To a jealous Cleo, it appears that Mrs. Diller likes the cute little puppy better than she likes Cleo! So Cleo determines to "out-cute" the puppy and win back Mrs. Diller's affection. But she soon learns that Mrs. Diller thinks Cleo is perfect just the way she is.; "A Bunny in a Haystack": When Emily-Elizabeth brings home the class bunny, Clifford, Cleo and T-Bone learn what a big responsibility it is to take care of a pet!
25	25	"Clothes Don't Make the Dog"	Dev Ross	Marty Murphy	January 23, 2001
25	25	"Short-Changed"	Pamela Hickey & Dennys McCoy	Jeff Gordon	January 23, 2001
"Clothes Don't Make the Dog": T-Bone gets a new sweater, but when a jealous Mac teases him about it, it embarrasses him. He soon learns that it's not what you wear that makes others like you.; "Short-Changed": When family friend Skyscraper Jackson comes to visit, Emily-Elizabeth worries that Clifford prefers the attention of a super tall basketball player to the attention of a short little girl. But Emily-Elizabeth soon learns that love comes in all sizes.
26	26	"The Kibble Crook"	Dev Ross	Marc Schirmeister	January 24, 2001
26	26	"Screaming for Ice Cream"	Sheryl Scarborough & Kayte Kuch	Marc Schirmeister	January 24, 2001
"The Kibble Crook": T-Bone can't resist sneaking a bite -- well, okay, the whole bowl -- of Cleo's new dog food. When Cleo gets upset, T-Bone blames it on another dog and sends our fearless friends on a wild goose chase. But T-Bone ultimately confesses that there is no other dog, and he learns that he must take responsibility for his own mistakes.; "Screaming for Ice Cream": Charley and Emily-Elizabeth find themselves up to their elbows in ice cream when Charley takes it upon himself to serve ice cream while his father is at a doctor's appointment. Charley learns that there are some responsibilities kids should not attempt to shoulder without the help of an adult.
27	27	"New Dog in Town"	Anne-Marie Perrotta & Tean Schultz	Phillip Mosness	January 25, 2001
27	27	"Get Well"	Don Gillies	Enrique May and Sahin Ersoz	January 25, 2001
"New Dog in Town": In a heartwarming flashback story, the audience learns how Clifford's enormous size frightened T-Bone when they met for the first time. T-Bone learns that "you can't judge a book by its cover" – and friends come in all shapes and sizes.; "Get Well": Emily-Elizabeth comes down with a cold and Clifford and friends want to help her feel better. Using their imaginations, creativity, and the resources around them, they create a card, collect flowers, a balloon, and a small gift. When they present their offerings to Emily-Elizabeth, it is obvious they have succeeded in making her feel cared for and loved. The dogs learn that it's the thought behind a gift that matters most.
28	28	"Babysitter Blues"	Dev Ross	Tim George	January 26, 2001
28	28	"Saturday Morning"	Kati Rocky	Marty Murphy	January 26, 2001
"Babysitter Blues": Mr. Bleakman is ready for a quiet relaxing weekend of oil painting. But a monkey wrench is thrown in the works when he is asked to babysit Clifford for the day. Mr. Bleakman struggles to find a way to keep Clifford out of his way, but soon discovers that the big red dog has much to teach him about being spontaneous and having fun.; "Saturday Morning": When T-Bone's "special Saturday time" with Sheriff Lewis doesn't turn out the way he expected one week, he goes on a quest to see how others spend their Saturdays. He learns there are many different ways to spend time with the people you love.
29	29	"Best Paw Forward"	Bob Carrau	Jeff Gordon	January 29, 2001
29	29	"Then Came Bob"	Anne-Marie Perrotta & Tean Schultz	Norma Rivera-Klingler	January 29, 2001
"Best Paw Forward": Cement is being poured at the new Birdwell Island recreation center and the kids and dogs are invited to leave their hand prints in the cement. But it is quickly discovered that Clifford's paw print is just too big to stay. Seeing Clifford's disappointment, his friends work together to find a way to include Clifford – and everyone is delighted when Clifford's paw print becomes the new wading pool for the very young children of Birdwell Island.; "Then Came Bob": Vaz babysits a cute, but not very well-behaved dog that Dr. Dihn recently acquired from the dog pound. This little mischief-maker is very good at getting into trouble – and causing Clifford to get the blame. Several people think Clifford has suddenly developed some very bad habits – but Emily-Elizabeth never doubts her big dog for a minute. The truth about Bob finally comes out and Clifford receives apologies from all his doubters.
30	30	"Friends, Morning, Noon, and Night"	Scott Guy	Sahin Ersoz	January 30, 2001
30	30	"Mr. Bleakman's Special Day"	Bruce Talkington	Tim George	January 30, 2001
"Friends, Morning, Noon and Night": Cleo and Clifford are excited to learn that Cleo will be Clifford's houseguest for a weekend while her house is being painted. But soon Cleo is filling Clifford's doghouse with her stuff, taking over his bed, and butting in on his time alone with Emily-Elizabeth. It takes time, but Cleo eventually learns that being a good houseguest means respecting the needs of the host.; "Mr. Bleakman's Special Day": Mr. Bleakman appears to the dogs to be particularly grumpy one day. At first they are upset with him, but then when they overhear Mrs. Howard say that sometimes a grumpy attitude can be changed through acts of kindness. This inspires the dogs to perform a series of "secret good deeds" to see if they can turn Mr. Bleakman's frown into a smile. They are surprised to learn that performing kind acts makes them feel better, too!
31	31	"Doggie Garden"	Dev Ross	Jeff Gordon	October 3, 2001
31	31	"Captain Birdwell's Treasure"	Scott Guy	Sahin Ersoz	October 3, 2001
"Doggie Garden": It's "Keep Birdwell Beautiful" month and the kids are doing their part by planting a flower garden. Seeing this, the dogs decide to create a doggie flower garden of their own. But when Cleo hears that "almost anything grows" in Birdwell Island soil, she decides she'd much rather grow a garden full of dog toys! She soon learns, however, that working alone for a selfish end is not nearly as rewarding as working together for the whole community.; "Captain Birdwell's Treasure": Clifford and his dog friends find the long-lost trunk of Captain Birdwell, filled with wonderful items brought to the Island by the explorer long ago. But through a misunderstanding, Jetta is given credit for the discovery. She knows that telling the truth is the right thing to do, but she can't resist the promise of a gold medal award. It doesn't take long for her to realize, however, that awards don't give much pleasure when they're not deserved.
32	32	"Welcome to the Doghouse"	Scott Guy	Enrique May	October 10, 2001
32	32	"Promises, Promises"	Dennis Haley & Marcy Brown	Ken Boyer	October 10, 2001
"Welcome to the Doghouse": In this flashback episode the audience sees some of the challenges the Howards faced when they arrived on Birdwell Island with a very big red dog. Where will Clifford live? How will they feed him? What will they use as a water dish? The folks of Birdwell Island work together to help the new arrivals solve their dilemmas, forging strong new friendships in the process.; "Promises, Promises": Jetta and Emily-Elizabeth make plans to spend their Saturday at Seal Cove together, but Jetta breaks the play date when a "better offer" from an older girl comes along. However, when the older girl calls and cancels on Jetta, Jetta understands how Emily-Elizabeth must have felt. She now realizes that being a good friend means keeping a promise.
33	33	"Clifford's Hiccups"	Baz Hawkins	Jeff Gordon	October 17, 2001
33	33	"It's My Party"	Bob Carrau	Tim George	October 17, 2001
"Clifford's Hiccups": Clifford gets a bad case of the hiccups -- and that's a real problem with a dog the size of Clifford! His dog friends work together to come up with various remedies for Clifford. They are not successful and the hiccups eventually go away on their own. But Clifford expresses to his friends how good it feels to know they care so much about him.; "It's My Party": When Jetta throws a "movie-watching" party, she expects everyone to do things her way -- which in this case means watching home movies of herself. The other kids try their best, but are soon bored and take a vote to go outside and make their own movie with Vaz's movie camera. Jetta is encouraged to join them, but stubbornly refuses. But she soon learns that it's more fun to play when everyone has a voice in deciding what to do together.
34	34	"Clifford Cleans His Room"	Dev Ross	Phillip Mosness	October 24, 2001
34	34	"Baby Makes Four"	Lois Becker & Mark Stratton	Marty Murphy	October 24, 2001
"Clifford Cleans His Room": Clifford's good friends come over to clean out his doghouse, determined to get rid of all the old "junk" he no longer uses. But before long Clifford realizes that each item holds a special memory and can't be parted with. Mac thinks this is nonsense, until he is reminded of a memory in which he was included. He then understands, along with Clifford, that one dog's "junk" can be another dog's treasure.; "Baby Makes Four": Jetta gets a new baby brother and at first is extremely proud to be a big sister. But when she realizes this means she will now have to share the spotlight with the baby, she goes out to get back her attention as the "center of attention." She eventually learns that a good "big sister" is far more rewarding than being the "star of the show."
35	35	"Jetta's Tall Tale"	Kati Rocky	Ken Boyer	October 31, 2001
35	35	"The Big Fetch"	Don Gillies	Sahin Ersoz	October 31, 2001
"Jetta's Tall Tale": Jetta feels a twinge of jealousy when they other children make a fuss over Emily-Elizabeth's wonderful pet Clifford, so she blurts out a story about her own big pet -- a huge parrot named Lulu. But the little lie quickly grows into a big mess, forcing Jetta to dress Clifford up as a bird to keep the lie from being exposed. Her conscience finally makes her do the right thing and she apologizes for having created the lie in the first place.; "The Big Fetch": Vaz is new at being a paperboy and is struggling with getting the papers onto people's doorsteps. Cleo steps in and discovers that she can earn treats by helping out! She recruits Clifford and T-Bone and together they enjoy helping Vaz out -- and getting treats. But before long Cleo has forgotten about the "helping out" part and is only concerned with getting treats. Clifford and T-Bone help her rediscover that helping for its own sake is its own reward.
36	36	"Potluck Party Pooper"	Dennis Haley & Marcy Brown	Tom Ellery	November 7, 2001
36	36	"The Best Gift"	Dennis Haley & Marcy Brown	Cynthia Petrovic	November 7, 2001
"Potluck Party Pooper": The Howards are having a party and everyone they know will be attending. Everyone but Mr. Bleakman, that is. The old "party pooper" insists that he'd rather stay home and do his usual Saturday afternoon routine. But Clifford, Emily-Elizabeth and all their friends won't give up on trying to convince Mr. Bleakman that trying something new can be fun! Finally they are able to convince him to join them and a great time is had by all.; "The Best Gift": Emily-Elizabeth believes she has the perfect gift for her mother's birthday. She plans to spend the entire afternoon with her mother and then reading her poem written just for her mom. Charley agrees that the gift is perfect, but Jetta has other ideas. But in the end she realizes that the gift she created from her heart really is the best gift.
37	37	"Two's Company"	Anne-Marie Perrotta & Tean Schultz	Norma Rivera-Klingler	November 14, 2001
37	37	"Fair Weather Friend"	Larry Swerdlove	Enrique May	November 14, 2001
"Two's Company": All of the dogs are excited that their old friend K.C. is back on the island for a couple of days. Cleo, however, is particularly excited and focuses all of her attention on him -- at the expense of ignoring T-Bone and Clifford. She discovers that being a good friend means you should be kind and considerate to all of your friends and not take any if them for granted.; "Fair Weather Friend": Mac is particularly disappointed when rainy weather threatens to ruin the upcoming Back-To-School Picnic held every year at Jetta's house. The other dogs, seeing his disappointment, vow to find a way to stop the rain from falling. It doesn't take long for them to realize that you can't change the weather. But Mac's disappointment is replaced with delight that his friends would go to great lengths to try to help him.
38	38	"Topsy Turvy Day"	Barry Harman	Cynthia Petrovic	November 21, 2001
38	38	"Clifford's Charm School"	Don Gillies	Phillip Mosness	November 21, 2001
"Topsy Turvy Day": Jetta and Emily-Elizabeth trade their dogs for the Island's annual Topsy Turvy Day, a day where everything gets turned around. Jetta learns that being kind and thoughtful gets you a lot farther than being bossy.; "Clifford's Charm School": Mrs. Bleakman is having a very special party for her book club members and Cleo and Mac convince Clifford that his regular good manners won't be good enough for the event. Clifford believes he is just fine the way he is, but Cleo and Mac insist on teaching him some "fancy" manners. In the end, Clifford decides to just be himself -- and ends up saving the party by providing shade for Mrs. Bleakman's guests.
39	39	"Forgive and Forget"	Anne-Marie Perrotta & Tean Schultz	Cynthia Petrovic	November 28, 2001
39	39	"Mimi's Back in Town"	Lois Becker & Mark Stratton	Enrique May	November 28, 2001
"Forgive and Forget": When Clifford forgets a play date, Cleo gets really upset. After all, she would never do that to a friend. Cleo won't even accept Clifford's apologies. But T-Bone points out to Cleo that maybe she is the one who isn't being a good friend. After all, Clifford did apologize - and a good friend would never hold a grudge. Cleo learns that good friends forgive (and forget too!).; "Mimi's Back in Town": T-Bone really likes Mimi, the little brown poodle that visits the Island on occasion. T-Bone is very excited to hear she's coming back again! But when Cleo starts teasing him about how much he likes Mimi, T-Bone feels embarrassed and uncomfortable. He finally confronts Cleo about it and Cleo learns that teasing can be anything that makes someone feel uncomfortable.
40	40	"Blanket Blues"	Dennis Haley & Marcy Brown	Jeff Gordon	December 5, 2001
40	40	"Dino Clifford"	Anne-Marie Perrotta & Tean Schultz	Norma Rivera-Klingler	December 5, 2001
"Blanket Blues": Cleo spies on Clifford's favorite blanket – one he has had since he was a puppy – and proclaims it the perfect cape for Super T-Bone. Clifford reluctantly allows his friends to use the blanket, if they promise to be very careful. The game turns rambunctious, the blanket gets dirty – and Clifford gets upset. Cleo and T-Bone realize that to be a good friend you should listen to and respect the wishes and property of others.; "Dino Clifford": Vaz's big sister Teresa is home from college and is ready to dig for dinosaur bones and fossils on Birdwell Island. Who is more perfect to help her dig than Clifford and his dog friends? Everybody has great luck digging up fossils that will complete a dinosaur skeleton that Teresa is piecing together – everybody but T-Bone, that is. But by believing in himself, T-Bone ultimately comes up with one of the most important bones to complete the job.

=== Season 2 (2002–03) ===
No. overall	No. in season	Title	Written by	Storyboarded by	Original release date
41	1	"That's Snow Lie"	Scott Guy	Cynthia Petrovic	February 12, 2002
41	1	"A Friend in Need"	Larry Swerdlove	Jeff Gordon	February 12, 2002
"That's Snow Lie": Cleo pretends to hurt herself so she won't have to embarrass herself on the ice rink. But with the help of Clifford and his friends, they help her understand that trying new things with your friends is fun.; "A Friend in Need": Jetta insists on taking a big job so she can be the "hero", but soon learns that it's okay to graciously accept help when it is needed and offered by good friends.
42	2	"Fan Mail"	Bob Carrau	Jenny Lerew	May 17, 2002
42	2	"Hooray for Cleo"	Don Gillies	Phil Mosness	May 17, 2002
"Fan Mail": Emily-Elizabeth writes a fan letter to her favorite pop star and discovers -- with the help of Mr. Bleakman -- that sometimes wishes do come true.; "Hooray for Cleo": Cleo withholds which makes everyone think she's a beach ball playing hero, then learns that there are many kinds of heroes -- and the best ones tell the truth.
43	3	"Nothing to Fur But Fur Itself"	Anne-Marie Perrotta & Tean Schultz	Tim George	May 23, 2002
43	3	"Jetta's Project"	Larry Swerdlove	Mark Zoeller	May 23, 2002
"Nothing to Fur But Fur Itself": Having been scared by a monster movie, T-Bone resolves to not let fear get the better of him -- easier said than done.; "Jetta's Project": When Jetta decides she really wants to win a model-building contest, she exploits her friendship with Charley and Emily-Elizabeth to get her way. But she soon learns that things work out much better when you treat your friends with respect.
44	4	"Stinky Friends"	Sindy McKay-Swerdlove	Paul Fisher	May 24, 2002
44	4	"He's Wonderful Mr. Bleakman"	Lois Becker & Mark Stratton	Garrett Ho	May 24, 2002
"Stinky Friends": Clifford can't resist going into a field to play -- even after Emily-Elizabeth tells him he's not allowed. He and his friends soon learn that rules are there for a reason and it's a good idea to follow them!; "He's Wonderful Mr. Bleakman": Mr. Bleakman gets a little grumpy when Clifford messes up his new potato garden, making Emily-Elizabeth almost wish he wasn't her neighbor; but through several flashbacks she is reminded if all the nice things he's done; and Emily-Elizabeth learns that under his sometimes gruff exterior he is a nice man and a very good neighbor.
45	5	"Magic in the Air"	Meg McLaughlin	Jennifer Lerew	May 27, 2002
45	5	"Everyone Loves Clifford"	Pamela Hickey & Dennys McCoy	Louis Scarborough	May 27, 2002
"Magic in the Air": When the Peter Poundstone, Magician craze sweeps the island, Charley gets carried away with the magic and neglects an important assignment. Charley learns that you can have fun but you have to be responsible too.; "Everyone Loves Clifford": When Emily Elizabeth scratches Clifford's "sweet spot" his back leg starts thumping and the whole island shakes! But the kindness and love everyone feels toward Clifford causes them to keep trying to find a way for him to get the good scratching he deserves.
46	6	"Clifford Grows Up"	Barry "Baz" Hawkins	Cynthia Petrovic and Charles Visser	May 28, 2002
46	6	"Jetta's Sweater"	Cynthia Harrison & Brooks Wachtel	Shawna Gallego	May 28, 2002
"Clifford Grows Up": In their flashbacks, the Howards do their best to make Clifford comfortable after he's grown too big for their city apartment. They finally move to Birdwell Island, because making Clifford happy is so very important to them.; "Jetta's Sweater": Jetta inadvertently gives Emily-Elizabeth a sweater that was a gift from her grandma. When she realizes her mistake, she resorts to all kinds of tricks to get it back. But in the end she realizes that just being honest would have made everything a whole lot easier.
47	7	"Big Hearted T-Bone"	Cynthia Harrison & Brooks Wachtel	Shawna Gallego	May 29, 2002
47	7	"Cleo's Valentine Surprise"	Larry Swerdlove	Ken Boyer	May 29, 2002
"Big Hearted T-Bone": T-Bone generously offers to watch Cleo's niece Kiki so Cleo can get some rest. But his honorable intentions are challenged when his female friend Mimi comes to town and T-Bone must choose between responsibility and pleasure.; "Cleo's Valentine Surprise": Cleo, with some help from K.C., goes overboard preparing a special gift for Clifford and T-Bone. But when she doesn't get a big gift in return, she learns to recognize the joy in giving.
48	8	"Embarrassing Moments"	Meg McLaughlin	Tim George	May 30, 2002
48	8	"Lucky Charm"	Dennis Haley & Marcy Brown	Garrett Ho	May 30, 2002
"Embarrassing Moments": When Vaz rips his pants during a soccer game, everyone helps him feel better by telling their own tales of embarrassing moments. Jetta insists these things never happen to her, but she ends up laughing at her own potential for embarrassing moments.; "Lucky Charm": After losing her lucky stone, Emily-Elizabeth loses her confidence, and can't skate well without it. But Charley and Vaz help her understand that confidence comes from within.
49	9	"Princess Cleo"	Dev Ross	Enrique May	September 18, 2002
49	9	"Basketball Stories"	Barry "Baz" Hawkins	Diane Kredensor	September 18, 2002
"Princess Cleo": Cleo discovers her grandmother was a Queen -- and that makes her a Princess! She begins to enjoy all the privileges she believes come with being a Princess -- but soon learns that her friends are more important to her that any other crown or title could ever be.; "Basketball Stories": Skyscraper Jackson has come to Birdwell Island for a big exhibition game, which makes Charley not to miss anything -- except a bad cold. But Emily-Elizabeth, Vaz and Jetta each write a story about the game for Charley from their different point of view. Charley gets to relive the game through his friends' stories and they have a lot of fun writing and reading them to him.
50	10	"Doggie Detectives"	Larry Swerdlove	Zoom Cartoons, Ent.	May 16, 2002
50	10	"Camping it Up"	Scott Guy	Barry Cauldwell	May 16, 2002
"Doggie Detectives": Equipment is disappearing from the local playground and it's up to K.C., inspired by the Detective Mike books he likes so much, to figure out what happened. He enlists the help of Clifford and the gang to form the "Doggie Detectives" to solve the mystery and the whole gang soon discovers the joy of discovery available in reading a good book!; "Camping it Up": Because she thinks camping is going to be boring, Jetta tries to bring the comforts of home into the woods. But she soon realizes that there's more than one way to have a good time -- and sometimes the simple way is just perfect.
51	11	"Cleo Gets a Cone"	Meg McLaughlin	Ken Boyer & Marc Schirmeister	October 2, 2002
51	11	"A Job Well Read"	Meg McLaughlin	Garrett Ho	October 2, 2002
"Cleo Gets a Cone": The dogs see another dog wearing a cone collar (actually, an Elizabethan collar), and Cleo and Mac make assumptions about the other dog's "weakness of character"! That is, she should have been able to stop scratching. However, a few days later, Cleo is forced to "walk a mile in her cone" when she herself can't stop scratching -- and the experience teaches her compassion.; "A Job Well Read": Jetta volunteers to watch her baby brother Cosmo but finds him more energetic than she was expecting. With the help of her good friends Charley and Emily-Elizabeth, she's convinced to try reading to the little guy -- an activity that Cosmo really loves!
52	12	"When I Grow Up"	Barry "Baz" Hawkins	Scott Jeralds	October 16, 2002
52	12	"Not Now, I'm Busy"	Larry Swerdlove	Garrett Ho	October 16, 2002
"When I Grow Up": When Jetta hears that Charley wants to be a Martial Arts Master when he grows up, she gives him a difficult time about it. But Jetta soon learns that everyone's dreams are valuable and worthy.; "Not Now, I'm Busy": When K.C. tells the gang he's too busy to play with them today, Cleo feels slighted. Eventually the dogs learn that K.C. is moving to the island to be an Assistance Dog for Bruno's elderly mother. The dogs learn that even though sometimes friends aren't always available, they're still friends.
53	13	"Special T-Bone"	Anne-Marie Perrotta & Tean Schultz	Enrique May	October 16, 2002
53	13	"Jetta's Sneak Peek"	Kati Rocky	Diane Kredensor	October 16, 2002
"Special T-Bone": When Emily-Elizabeth starts working on a project titled "What Makes Me Special," it gets all the dogs to thinking about what makes them special. T-Bone isn't quite sure, but soon discovers that he has a special gift of making others feel good.; "Jetta's Sneak Peek": Jetta can't resist reading Emily-Elizabeth's diary, but soon learns that it's important to respect someone's privacy.
54	14	"Vaz Goes Down the Tubes"	Carter Crocker	Douglas McCarthy	October 23, 2002
54	14	"Cyber Puppy Problems"	Jack & Carole Mendelsohn	Barry Cauldwell	October 23, 2002
"Vaz Goes Down the Tubes": Vaz gets a new satellite dish with 632 channels and begins to lose himself to the world of TV until Clifford and his friends help him realize that he's missing out on some very fun and important real-life experiences.; "Cyber Puppy Problems": When Mac worries, that Happy Birthday Jetta loves her mechanical toy dog cybo more that she loves him. His friends rally around to help him get through his crisis of confidence.
55	15	"Another Fine Mess"	Carter Crocker	Diane Kredensor	October 30, 2002
55	15	"King Mac"	Kati Rocky	Marc Schirmeister and Nate Clessowich	October 30, 2002
"Another Fine Mess": Emily-Elizabeth keeps putting off the responsibility of cleaning her room. She soon learns that taking care of responsibility now can save her a lot of trouble later.; "King Mac": Mac keeps quiet, and mistakenly gets a reward for T-Bone's work. When T-Bone thinks he is responsible for getting Mac in trouble, he goes overboard to help Mac in any way he can. But Mac shows a lack of respect for their friendship by taking advantage of his little friend's guilt, and he discovers that telling the truth is a lot more important than having a yummy treat.
56	16	"Who Moved My Bone?"	Cynthia Harrison & Brooks Wachtel	Scott Jeralds	November 6, 2002
56	16	"Clifford the Pirate King"	Don Gillies	Phil Mendez	November 6, 2002
"Who Moved My Bone?": When Cleo accuses T-Bone of trying to steal her bone, Clifford gets caught in the middle of his two feuding friends. Clifford helps them realize that you can't be good friends if all you do is fight over something like a silly old bone. His efforts finally pay off when Cleo and T-Bone realize that their friendship is more important.; "Clifford the Pirate King": After reading the book "Treasure Island" in school, the kids decide to throw a "Treasure Island" theme party. Clifford helps them prepare for the festivities. But once the party begins, they discover Clifford is too big for the boat. The kids decide to relocate the party rather than let Clifford feel left out.
57	17	"Clifford's Cookie Craving"	Barry "Baz" Hawkins	Tim George and Enrique May	November 13, 2002
57	17	"Jetta's Friend"	Marcy Brown & Dennis Haley	Phil Mendez	November 13, 2002
"Clifford's Cookie Craving": Mr. Bleakman bakes a giant cookie for the Birdwell Fair, then leaves it unattended. Clifford, T-Bone and Cleo get one whiff of it and, try as they might, simply can't resist the temptation to taste it. Mr. Bleakman forgives the 3 dogs when he realizes that everyone makes mistakes -- including the mistake of leaving too big of a temptation in front of a child.; "Jetta's Friend": When her pen pal, Monique, visits the island, nothing goes as Jetta planned much, but to her own surprise, she still has fun anyway!
58	18	"Fishing Lessons"	Bob Carrau	Byron Vaughns	November 16, 2002
58	18	"No Baths For Cleo"	Dennis Haley & Marcy Brown	Tim George	November 16, 2002
"Fishing Lessons": Emily-Elizabeth is excited to go on a fishing adventure with Charley. Charley promises to teach Emily-Elizabeth how to fish, then keeps putting it off until "tomorrow." Emily-Elizabeth and Jetta help him realize that once a promise is made, it should be honored and respected, and you can't break a promise if you keep one.; "No Baths for Cleo": To avoid baths, Cleo runs away from home. With the help of her friends, she comes to understand and respect the fact that having a bath is just one of the many ways Mrs. Diller shows her love.
59	19	"Clifford's Big Heart"	Baz Hawkins	Sahin Ersoz	February 14, 2003
59	19	"Cleo's Valentine Surprise"	Larry Swerdlove	Ken Boyer	February 14, 2003
"Clifford's Big Heart": Repeat of an episode aired during the first season.; "Cleo's Valentine Surprise": Repeat of an episode aired earlier in this season.; Note: Based on part of the special, Clifford's Valentine's Day Special
60	20	"Flood of Imagination"	Scott Guy	Tim George and Marc Schirmeister	February 17, 2003
60	20	"Lights Out!"	Lois Becker & Mark Stratton	Charles Visser	February 17, 2003
"Flood of Imagination": It's raining and Cleo's going stir-crazy with boredom! But Clifford comes to her rescue by helping her to imagine an exciting action/adventure story.; "Lights Out!": When a blackout hits Birdwell Island, Clifford and Mr. Bleakman save the day by looking for a big traffic light.
61	21	"A Big Help"	Don Gillies	Zoom Cartoons, Ent. and Marc Schirmeister	February 18, 2003
61	21	"The Trouble With Kittens"	Dev Ross	Garrett Ho	February 18, 2003
"A Big Help": Cleo and T-Bone notice how often Clifford is able to use his large size to help out. But when the kittens, Billy and Betty, get stuck in a tree, the little dogs learn that you don't have to be big to be helpful.; "The Trouble With Kittens": When kittens Betty and Billy insist on playing in Mr. Bleakman's yard, Clifford does his best to keep them out. But when they wreak havoc in the yard, Clifford gets the blame from Mr. Bleakman! Mr. Bleakman soon learns that it's not fair to judge a situation until you have all the facts.
62	22	"Led Astray"	Marcy Brown & Dennis Haley	Cynthia Petrovic and Enrique May	February 19, 2003
62	22	"Wedding Bell Blues"	Dev Ross	Diane Kredensor	February 19, 2003
"Led Astray": A visiting dog influences Clifford to do things that he knows aren't right. But Clifford soon learns that he can has the strength of character to stand up for himself and what he believes.; "Wedding Bell Blues": Ms. Carrington is getting married and the kids speculate about what kind of teacher "Mrs. Grumbly" will be. Based on her name, they assume she will not be very nice. But they soon learn that you can't judge someone until you've actually met them.
63	23	"Food For Thought"	Marcy Brown & Dennis Haley	Douglas McCarthy	February 20, 2003
63	23	"Friends Forever"	Larry Swerdlove	Barry Cauldwell and David Mucci Fassett	February 20, 2003
"Food for Thought": Clifford and his friends are influenced by advertisements for a new dog food.; "Friends Forever": When T-Bone learns his old best buddy Hamburger is coming for a visit, he tells Clifford and Cleo about the time when he was a puppy, and thought he'd never be able to have another friend as good Hamburger. (Note: Hamburger is voiced by Kenan Thompson, Kel Mitchell's co star on the Nickelodeon television series Kenan & Kel and All That.)
64	24	"Tie-Dye Clifford"	Larry Swerdlove	Scott Jeralds	February 21, 2003
64	24	"Stage Struck"	Marcy Brown & Dennis Haley	Garrett Ho	February 21, 2003
"Tie-Dye Clifford": When Clifford accidentally gives himself a bath with tie-dye dyes, he ends up looking like a T-shirt from the '60s! Not wanting to upset Emily Elizabeth, he tries to hide the fact. But soon learns that he can tell the truth to Emily Elizabeth because she understands that everyone makes mistakes.; "Stage Struck": Mary has always been afraid to perform in front of an audience. But with the help and support of her friend Emily-Elizabeth, Mary is able to overcome her stage fright.
65	25	"Doghouse Rock"	Meg McLaughlin W : Brooks Wachtel; W/T : Cynthia Harrison	Tom Ellery and Cynthia Petrovic	February 24, 2003
65	25	"Guess Who's Coming to Birdwell"	Meg McLaughlin W : Brooks Wachtel; W/T : Cynthia Harrison	Byron Vaughns	February 24, 2003
"Doghouse Rock": Mac wants to join the pop band T-Bone has put together, but has a difficult time finding where his talents fit in. With the help of his good friends, Mac discovers he has a special talent for writing.; "Guess Who's Coming to Birdwell": When the famous dog champion, Oscar Owen Bright Like the Sun (Mark Hamill), comes to Birdwell, the dogs go out of their way to impress him. But they soon learn that the best way to impress someone is to just be yourself.
66	26	"Little Big Pup"	Ken Koonce & Dave Weimers	Marty Murphy	February 25, 2003
66	26	"Getting to Know You"	Anne-Marie Perrotta & Tean Schultz	David Mucci Fassett	February 25, 2003
"Little Big Pup": A very small dog named Frankie (Frankie Muniz) moves to Birdwell Island and is envious of Clifford's size until he realizes that sometimes being small can be just right.; "Getting to Know You": When Clifford moves to the island, he makes friends with T-Bone, but the 2 dogs learn that some adjustments must be made to accommodate their size difference.
