= Bess Freedman =

American businesswoman

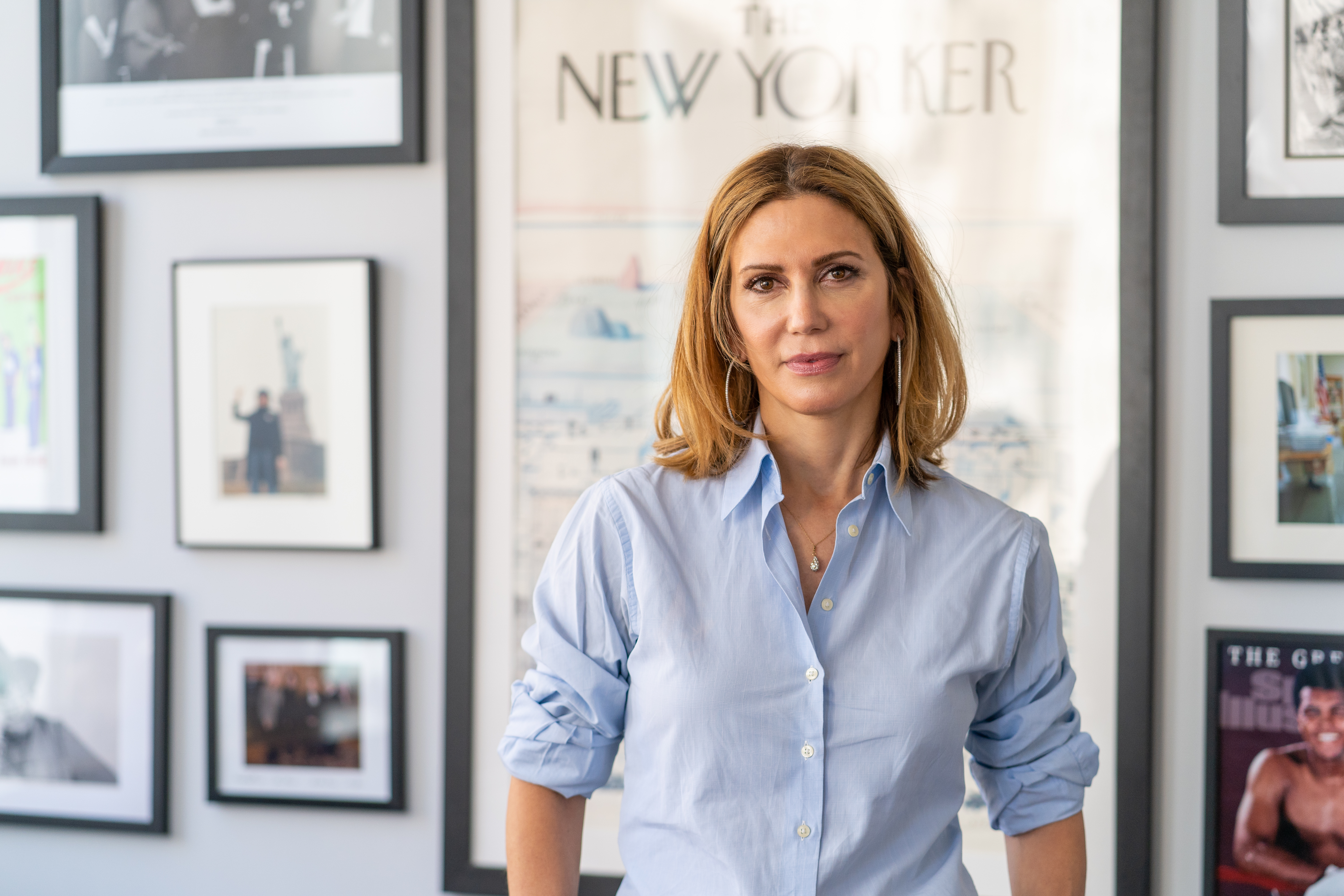
- Born: May 31, 1969 (age 57)
- Education: University of the District of Columbia (J.D.)
- Occupations: Businesswoman; CEO of Brown Harris Stevens

Bess Freedman (born May 31, 1969) is an American businesswoman. She is currently the CEO of Brown Harris Stevens. She previously practiced law.

== Career ==
Born in Troy, New York, Freedman got her undergraduate degree from Ithaca College and completed her Juris Doctor degree at the University of the District of Columbia. She practiced law as an Assistant State's Attorney and worked as an attorney at Legal Aid Society. In 2003, Freedman joined the Corcoran Group, an American real estate firm. At the Corcoran Group, she served as Senior Managing Director for the East Side headquarters.

In 2013, Freedman joined Brown Harris Stevens as Senior Vice President. In 2017, she was named its co-president alongside Hall Willkie. Less than a year later, Freedman was appointed as the company's first CEO.

In 2020, Freedman became one of the first NYC-based brokerage leaders to offer Election Day as a paid company holiday to all employees nationwide. In 2022, when Roe vs. Wade was overturned, Freedman announced that Brown Harris Stevens would reimburse travel expenses up to $4,000 for any real estate agent or employee who must travel to access safe and legal reproductive healthcare.
