= Robert Bluey =

American blogger (born 1979)

Robert B. Bluey
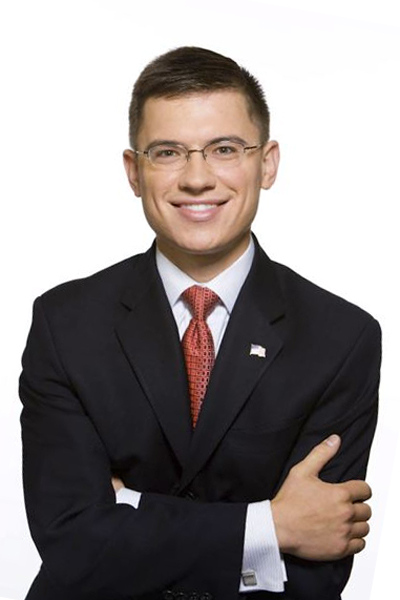
- Bluey in 2009
- Born: August 23, 1979 (age 47); New York City, U.S.
- Education: Ithaca College
- Occupations: Vice president of publishing at The Heritage Foundation, editor-in-chief of The Daily Signal
- Employer: The Heritage Foundation

Robert B. Bluey (born August 23, 1979) is an American conservative blogger and journalist. He is executive editor of The Heritage Foundation's The Daily Signal, a multimedia news organization. Bluey is a former editor of Human Events. He has written for The Daily Caller, RedState, Andrew Breitbart's Big Government and the Washington Examiner.

== Early life and education ==
Bluey was born in upstate New York and graduated from Ithaca College with a bachelor's degree in journalism. While a student, Bluey was the editor of the college newspaper, The Ithacan. After graduating, he spent one year as a fellow at the Student Press Law Center in Arlington, Virginia.

== Career ==
In 2004, while a reporter at Cybercast News Service, Bluey wrote about the Killian documents controversy regarding President George W. Bush's service in the Air National Guard.

Bluey became managing editor and later online editor at Human Events, where he developed the paper's first blog. In 2006, Bluey co-founded "The Bloggers Briefing", a weekly policy discussion among conservative bloggers, politicians and activists. Guests included Congressmen John Boehner, Eric Cantor and Paul Ryan, Senators Tom Coburn, Jim DeMint and Jim Inhofe, former House Speaker Newt Gingrich, talk-show host Herman Cain, and reporter Robert Novak. Bluey was one of a handful of bloggers invited to attend the bill-signing ceremony of the Federal Funding Accountability and Transparency Act of 2006. He also co-authored the Sunlight Foundation’s Open House Project, which aimed to increase online transparency in Congress.

In 2007, Bluey was hired at The Heritage Foundation, where he became editor of the foundation’s web site and helped create its blog, The Foundry. Campaigns & Elections named Bluey one of its "rising stars of 2008," and Politico called him one of the "top 50 politicos to watch." He took on the role of director of Heritage's Center for Media and Public Policy in 2010, where he led the think tank's investigative reporting team.
