= Brown Harris Stevens =

American real estate company

- Type: Private
- Industry: Residential Real Estate
- Founded: 1873
- Founder: Charles Stelle Brown
- Headquarters: New York City, New York, United States of America
- Key people: Bess Freedman (CEO); Itzaskun Garay(Co-President Managing Director of Sales); Kevin Kovesci(Co-President, Managing Director of Sales); Christopher Halstead (Chief Strategy Officer); Stephen Kliegerman (President, Development Marketing); Hall F. Willkie (President Emeritus & Chief Brokerage Consultant)
- Number of employees: 1,592
- Website: bhsusa.com

Brown Harris Stevens is an American real estate service company headquartered in New York City with offices across the East Coast serving Connecticut, New Jersey, the Hudson Valley, the Hamptons, Palm Beach, and Miami. The original firm was founded in 1873. It is primarily known for its real estate brokerage and management divisions that have catered to wealthy buyers and sellers.

== Early history ==
After graduating from college, Charles Stelle Brown entered the real estate business in New York City in 1873, and specialized in valuations and appraisals. A descendant of Dutch settlers in the area, Brown was born in New York. His business was immediately successful.

In 1901, Brown formed a partnership with the prominent New York real estate broker Douglas Robinson. Robinson was married to the former Corinne Roosevelt, sister of President Theodore Roosevelt. The new partnership was called Douglas Robinson, Charles S. Brown Company.

On Robinson's staff was appraiser Francis K. Stevens. Stevens began his real estate career with the Astor Bank after graduating from Yale in 1897. He joined Robinson's office in 1901. Stevens remained with the merged companies.

While Robinson and Brown increasingly handled many high-profile transactions in the city, another broker was making his mark in the field. Duncan G. Harris began his real estate career as an assistant to real estate tycoon John Jacob Astor in 1901, the year after he graduated from Harvard.

In 1907, Harris began his own firm, Harris & Vaughan. He later partnered with Douglas Vought and, in 1914, the company name changed to Harris, Vought & Co.

William H. Wheelock joined the Robinson Brown firm after he graduated from Harvard in 1898. Starting in the maintenance department, Wheelock rose through the ranks to become a vice president and director in 1902. When Robinson died in 1918, Wheelock was elected president of the firm.

In 1922, Wheelock and Harris arranged a merger of their two firms and the new company was named Brown, Wheelock, Harris, Vought & Co. When Vought left the firm in 1931, the name changed to Brown, Wheelock, Harris & Co.

Charles S. Brown died at 85 in 1935. He held the title of chairman of the board. He was a trustee or director of several insurance and banking companies and non-profit groups. He lived at 535 Park Avenue.

In 1938, Wheelock took Brown's title of chairman and Harris become president. The firm's main office was at 67 Wall Street. When the new titles were announced, it was noted that Wheelock had participated in the sale of the Waldorf-Astoria Hotel and the assemblage of the land for the Pennsylvania Railroad Station. When Wheelock died in 1942, he was also credited with assembling property for New York Hospital, Presbyterian Hospital and the Brooks Brothers and Gimbels stores. At the time of Wheelock's death, the firm had the name Brown, Wheelock, Harris, Stevens, Inc.

By 1948, the name of the company was Brown, Harris, Stevens. Harris, who had been president since 1938, took the title of chairman of the board in 1951. Henry Forster, vice president, become president. Another Harvard graduate, Forster had joined the company in 1913.

In 1959, Forster stepped down as president and became vice chairman; John W. Lonsdale became president; and Harris remained as chairman of the board. Lonsdale had been a vice president of the firm since 1941. Forster retired from the firm in 1960 but continued to work in real estate. He finally retired from William A. White & Sons in 1984 after his 95th birthday. He died at age 100 in 1989. After his death, the Real Estate Board of New York established the Henry Forster Award for “outstanding record of achievement and conduct – both within the industry and in the community.” The award was given to a member of the profession "whose career accomplishment brings credit to the residential brokerage community." The first award was given in 1990.

== Helmsley era ==
New York real estate investor Harry Helmsley purchased the company in 1965. Helmsley retained Harris as chairman. Paul J. Etzel was president. Helmsley said he would keep the company, which was mainly known for its residential brokerage and management services, separate from his commercial companies. In 1970, Harris died at age 93.

Seven top agents and executives from rival Douglas Elliman moved to Brown Harris Stevens in 1988. Angered by Elliman's management policies and the firing of executive Roger Tuckerman, the group moved to Brown Harris Stevens along with the management of many buildings at prestigious addresses. Tuckerman later became president of Brown Harris Stevens. Hall Willkie, one of the executives who left Elliman, became sales director.

The Helmsley real estate empire suffered when Helmsley's wife Leona was convicted for federal income tax evasion and other crimes in 1989. After serving nineteen months in prison and dealing with her husband's declining health, Mrs. Helmsley put the company on the market in 1992.

In 1994, more than 80 individual New York real estate property managers and companies pled guilty to charges of bribery by Manhattan District Attorney's office. The managers were found to have been extorting millions of dollars annually from contractors working in buildings managed by the companies. A total of fourteen real estate management companies were found to have employees involved in the schemes. Brown Harris Stevens saw 17 of its agents indicted. The company acknowledged that it failed to properly supervise the managers and made more than $1 million in restitution payments.

The company was the exclusive sales agent for the sale of the cooperative apartment owned by the late Jacqueline Kennedy Onassis in early 1995. The 14-room apartment was sold to industrialist David Koch for $9.5 million.

== Terra Holdings era ==
In March 1995, Helmsley sold the company to Terra Holdings, a partnership composed of Arthur Zeckendorf, William Lie Zeckendorf, Kent Swig, and David Burris.

After five years, in 2000, the number of buildings managed by the company went from 98 to 170. On the brokerage side of the business, the number of agents grew to a total of 160 from 58 and closed sales went from $250–300 million to $1.3 billion. The company's headquarters was located at 770 Lexington Avenue with Manhattan sales offices on the east side, west side, downtown and another office in Palm Beach, Florida.

Terra Holdings also purchased Halstead Property Company in 2001. The combined companies made the firm the second largest in New York, behind Douglas Elliman. The combined sales volume of the two companies would be close to $3 billion and number of agents was 635. In the previous two years, Brown Harris Stevens purchased one of the city's largest rental brokerage firms, Feathered Nest.

In 2001, Hall F. Willkie was named president of the company's residential sales division after previously being executive vice president. Willkie was charged with overseeing the company's 190 residential sales agents.

In 2009, the firm took over Edward Lee Cave Inc., a 28-year-old firm noted for its high-end sales.

For the year ended on February 29, 2016, Brown Harris Steven had closed 789 sales totaling $2.02 billion.

In 2017, the company was the exclusive agent for the sale of David Rockefeller's upper east side town house. The asking price was $32.5 million.

Bess Freedman, an executive with the company, was named co-president with Hall Willkie in 2017. At that time, the company had about 500 agents and closed more than $4 billion in sales in the previous year in NYC. Less than a year later, she was promoted to Chief Executive Officer.

In 2025, the company announced that Hall Willkie would step down as President of the NYC Brokerage after 37 years, and into a full-time consulting role for the next 6 years. Sales managers Kevin Kovesci and Itzy Garay were named as co-presidents in his place.

== Restructuring ==
In June 2020, Terra Holdings announced that its subsidiaries Brown Harris Stevens and Halstead would restructure to form one unified company operating under the Brown Harris Stevens Brand. The move created one of the largest privately held real estate services companies with more than 2,500 agents and 55 offices across New York City, Connecticut, New Jersey, the Hudson Valley, the Hamptons, Palm Beach and Miami. Combined, the two firms had more than $9 billion in sales in 2019.
