= Firebrand (Green Rider series) =

Novel by Kristen Britain

- First edition
- Author: Kristen Britain
- Cover artist: Donato Giancola
- Language: English
- Series: Green Rider (series)
- Genre: Epic fantasy
- Publisher: DAW Books
- Publication date: February 28, 2017
- Publication place: United States
- Media type: Print (Hardback)
- Pages: 816
- ISBN: 978-0-575-09972-2
- Preceded by: Mirror Sight
- Followed by: Winterlight

Firebrand by Kristen Britain is a fantasy novel from 2017, the sixth book in the Green Rider series.

== Plot summary ==
Green Rider Sir Karigan G'ladheon returns from her unexpected trip through time in her traditional disruptive style, materialising above the great banquet hall and crashing through the mid-winter feast. She is confused and disoriented and screams for the man she left behind in the future to be reunited with her. Karigan tries to regain a sense of normality, recover from her injuries and move on from the heartbreak she suffered when Cade Harlow was ripped from her as she crossed over the threshold of time. During her return journey she sustains an injury, where a shard of magic mirror is embedded in her eye that transforms it into a mirror such that anyone who gazes into it glimpses their possible future. Karigan's eye becomes incredibly painful, she keeps it covered with a patch, and its prophetic properties are a closely guarded secret. Throughout the winter Karigan resumes her arms training and the king's elite guard, the Weapons, deem her heroic deeds and combat skills worthy to formalise her status as swordmaster and honorary Weapon, imbuing her with more titles, responsibilities and benefits.

Meanwhile, King Zachary of Sacoridia is struggling with his feelings for Karigan, and is becoming increasingly fatigued with his duty as king and as husband to his new wife Queen Estora. After their highly traumatic deathbed wedding, their relationship is strained; however Estora quickly becomes pregnant with twins which does begin to mend the rift. The castle is attacked by an ancient ice elemental, the "Aureas Slee", manipulated by the Second Empire. Slee is wounded and retreats but not before encountering the beautiful expectant Queen. Fortunately, the Queen was protected by Anna the ash girl, who later becomes a green rider.

Visiting Eletians inform King Zachary and his Captain, Laren Mapstone, of a prophecy that tells them the time is nigh to find the fourth race in the league that originally joined with Sacoridia, Eletia and Rhovanny to defeat Mornhaven the Black in the long war, and that he must send an emissary forth to meet with the p'ehdrosian race, who have not been seen in over 1,000 years.

Karigan is assigned the new mission to seek out the legendary p'ehdrosian, a race that resemble half moose, half human beings and to renew an alliance of old in the face of dire threats from enemies who seek to destroy Sacoridia using dark magic again. She is sent as an ambassador with an Eletian guide named Enver, and her friend Estral Andovian.

Once Karigan leaves the castle, the Aureas Slee stealthily spirits King Zachary away to its lair in the frozen north and assumes his place, fooling everyone, including the Queen. As the imposter king grows more and more controlling of Queen Estora, his identity is revealed and he is ousted once more from the castle. The inhabitants of the castle rally, stepping up preparations for the coming war. Laren Mapstone is promoted to colonel and dispatches groups of riders and weapons to search the country for the missing king.

Each step on Karigan's journey northward grows more perilous as she faces attacks from groundmites, encounters with ghosts, and, ultimately, the threat of the necromancer and leader of Second Empire, Grandmother, as they approach the enemy encampment in the Lone Forest.

King Zachary is imprisoned for some time within the Aureas Slee's icey domain along with an old Eletian named Narvi. He escapes, and is unrecognisable with his wounds, but is captured immediately by Second Empire, who are based in the north at an old fortification. He is forced to work as a slave digging up an ancient portal to the hells of the Sacoridian gods. Karigan arrives in the north and is also taken prisoner, where she is flogged and tortured. She and the king escape with the help of Enver, send word to a nearby military unit loyal to the king and prepare to take back the fort. Karigan is so badly wounded she is unable to go into battle. Second Empire succeed in opening the portal, releasing dark creatures that suck the life from anything they touch. The king is right in the midst of the danger and Karigan is called upon by the god Westrion to mount his steed Salvistar and appear as his avatar to contain the dark creatures and seal the portal.

The king is wounded by one of the dark creatures but pulls through and begins his journey back to Sacor City. Karigan goes her separate way to search for the p'ehdrose who are just in the next valley albeit out of phase with the world, so Karigan uses her ability to cross the threshold. The reception she and Enver receive is mixed and strained, but Karigan uses her mirror eye to show the p'ehdrose a future where they are hunted to extinction. Karigan and Enver leave successful, with a new alliance in place, however Enver becomes uncharacteristically agitated and reveals that he has been manipulated by the Eletian council to mate with Kariga. Sensing that he is about to become dangerous, Enver orders Karigan to flee from his presence.

Meanwhile Rider Beryl Spencer has been hunting for Xandis Amberhill since Karigan returned from the future with her intel. Spencer was posted in the eastern coastal towns, and finally received a tip off that he took a ship to a small island, and she sends word that she plans to follow him.

== Reception ==
Publishers Weekly referred to Firebrand as "exciting" and "dramatic", noting that, "despite its heft, the pages fly by".
