= Clifford the Big Red Dog (disambiguation) =

Clifford the Big Red Dog is a series of children's books written by Norman Bridwell.

Clifford the Big Red Dog may also refer to:

- Clifford (character), the central character of Clifford the Big Red Dog

== Film ==
- Clifford's Really Big Movie, 2004 animated movie
- Clifford the Big Red Dog (film), 2021 live-action/CGI movie

== TV ==
- Clifford the Big Red Dog (2000 TV series), 2000 animated TV series
- Clifford's Puppy Days, 2003 animated TV series
- Clifford the Big Red Dog (2019 TV series), 2019 animated TV series

== See also ==
- Clifford (disambiguation)
