= List of fictional dogs in animated television =

This is a list of fictional dogs in animated television and is a subsidiary to the list of fictional dogs. It is a collection of various animated dogs in television.

Name	Breed	TV program	Notes
Ace Hart Private Eye Dog	German Shepherd	Dog City	The detective.
Akamaru	Unknown	Naruto	Kiba Inuzuka's ninja dog.
Alistair	Generic	Crystal Tipps and Alistair	Crystal's friend in the British 5 minute shows.
Astro	Great Dane	The Jetsons	The family dog; about a family in the future.
Atticus	Welsh Corgi	Infinity Train	King of Corginia.
Augie Doggie	Dachshund	The Quick Draw McGraw Show	Doggie Daddy's pup.
Bailey	Australian Shepherd	Clifford the Big Red Dog	One of Clifford's friends.
Bandit	Terrier	Jonny Quest	Jonny's dog; about a boy who accompanies his father on extraordinary adventures
Barkley	Old English Sheepdog	Sesame Street	A puppet originally named Woof-Woof.
Barkleys, the	Generic	The Barkleys	A dog family, inspired by hit sitcom All in the Family.
Barney	Old English Sheepdog	Barney (British)	About a dog who has many adventures with a mouse friend.
Beck	Generic	Beck (Japanese)	Ryusuke's dog; about a teenage boy and his pursuit of a music career.
Beegle Beagle	Beagle	The Great Grape Ape Show	Great Ape's friend; about a 40-foot-tall purple gorilla and his canine pal who travel the countryside.
Beethoven	St. Bernard	Beethoven	A talking dog and his friends; inspired by the live-action films.
Berkley	Generic	Bad Dog	About a dog who, when told he was a bad dog, would freeze and pretend to be dead until someone told him he was a good dog.
Big Dog	Old English Sheepdog	2 Stupid Dogs	About a big dog and a little dog who aren't very smart and their everyday misadventures.
Big Tony and Little Sal	Dachshund	The Casagrandes	Vito Filliponio's pet dogs whom Ronnie Anne and Sid walked in the episode "Walk Don't Run". Big Tony loves to chase squirrels, and Little Sal thinks that he is a cat.
Billy Beagle	Beagle	Mickey and the Roadster Racers	An energetic racing announcer covering the races at Hot Dog Hills, played by Jay Leno.
Billy Dog	Bulldog cross Boxer Hybrid	The Busy World of Richard Scarry	One of the characters in the children's books and animated TV series; about anthropomorphic animals in the fictional city of Busytown.
Bingo	Pug	Puppy Dog Pals	About two puppies who have fun in when their owner leaves home
Binky Barnes	Bulldog	Arthur	One of the characters; about an 8-year-old boy an anthropomorphic aardvark his friends and family.
Bitzer	Sheepdog	Shaun the Sheep (British)	Shaun's friend; about an anthromophic sheep and farm associates.
Black Hayate	Unknown	Fullmetal Alchemist (Japanese)	Riza Hawkeye's dog; about the adventures of two alchemist brothers and set in a fictional universe where alchemy is an advanced scientific technique.
Blip	Unknown	Mixels	A Spikel who is a protagonist of the episode "Nixel Nixel Go Away".
Blue	Generic	Blue's Clues	A program intended to get preschoolers to learn through active participation in activities grounded in their everyday lives.
Bluey	Australian Cattle Dog	Bluey	A female anthropomorphic 6-year-old blue heeler puppy. She is curious and energetic
Bodi	Tibetian Mastiff	Rock Dog	A guitar playing dog
Bond	Pyrenean Mountain Dog	Spy × Family	Pet of the Forger family with precognition.
Brain	Generic	Inspector Gadget (Canadian)	Inspector Gadget's and Penny's faithful pet dog; about the adventures of a clumsy simple-witted cyborg detective.
Brandon	Generic	It's Punky Brewster	Punky's pet; about a girl and her dog abandoned by her mother.
Brandy Harrington	Golden Retriever	Brandy & Mr. Whiskers	About a dog and a hyperactive rabbit that get stuck in the Amazon Rainforest together.
Braveheart	Generic	Inch High, Private Eye	Inch's dog; about a miniature detective, her niece and dog who solve mysteries.
Brian	Beagle	Family Guy	The family dog and equal family member; about the Griffins, a dysfunctional family.
Buford	Bloodhound	The Buford Files	A smart but sleepy bloodhound; about a dog who teams up with two teenagers to solves confusing mysteries.
Bullet	Generic	Barney Google and Snuffy Smith	Snuffy's dog
Bumpy	Generic	Noddy (British)	Noddy's companion; a character created by Enid Blyton.
Burp	Generic	Gerald Mc Boing Boing	Gerald's dog in the TV series The Gerald McBoing-Boing Show.
Buster	Generic	The Fantastic Flying Journey	About three kids their uncle and a dog traveling in a fantastic flying machine.
Buster	Unknown	My Friends Tigger & Pooh	Darby's pet puppy who is part of the Super Sleuths group.
Butch	Bulldog	Mickey Mouse Clubhouse	Pluto's nemesis.
Buttercup	Chihuahua	The Casagrandes	Mrs. Flores's pet dog whom Ronnie Anne and Sid walked in the episode "Walk Don't Run". She likes to eat anything in sight.
Buttons	German Shepherd	Animaniacs	The dog that takes care of Mindy.
Canine	Generic	Glenn Martin, DDS	The family's dog who has an oversized anus.
Ceri the Dog-tective	Generic	Llan-ar-goll-en	A detective, and Prys ar Frys' animated dog friend.
Charkie	Cocker Spaniel	Curious George	Steve and Betsy's dog; about a brown monkey who is brought from his home in Africa by "The Man with The Yellow Hat" to live in a big city.
Charles	Pitbull terrier	The Loud House	The Loud family's pet dog.
Choppy	Bulldog	The Yogi Bear Show	The guardian of Yakky, an anthropomorphic yellow duckling; about a fast-talking picnic basket stealing bear named Yogi.
Chuchu	Generic	The Amazing Chan and the Chan Clan	The children's dog; about the Chan family who solve mysteries around the city.
Cinnamon	Yorkie	The Big Bang Theory	Raj's pet; about 4 nerdy scientists.
Cleo	Poodle	Clifford the Big Red Dog	One of Clifford's friends.
Clifford	Labrador Retriever	Clifford the Big Red Dog	Pet dog of Emily Elizabeth and the title character of the series; a giant dog that gets in constant trouble. Based on the best-selling children's book series of the same name by Norman Bridwell.
Corneil	Generic	Corneil & Bernie (French; also called Watch My Chops!)	John and Beth's pampered pet; about an intelligent talking dog and his "dog-sitter" Bernie Barges.
Cosmo, the Spacedog	Golden Retriever	Guardians of the Galaxy	About a telepathic Soviet dog who is the security chief of the space station Knowhere and a member of the Guardians.
Courage	Unknown	Courage the Cowardly Dog	About an anthropomorphic dog who lives with a married couple of elderly farmers in the "Middle of Nowhere".
Danny	Great Dane	JoJo's Bizarre Adventure	Jonathan Joestar's dog who gets kicked and killed by Dio Brando.
Dashi	Dachshund	The Octonauts (British)	A dog who is the photographer of the Octonauts.
Dennis	Dachshund	Toytown (British)	Larry the Lamb's sidekick.
Deputy Dawg	Generic	Terrytoons	A deputy sheriff in the Mississippi bayous.
Digger	Generic	Valley of the Dinosaurs	The family dog; about a family who find themselves in a prehistoric valley where they befriend a cave family.
Dill	Generic	The Herbs (British)	A hyperactive dog; about a fantasy mix of human and animal characters inhabiting the magical walled garden of a country estate.
Ding Dong	Generic	The houndcats	The right-hand man (dog) with bad timing and judgment, loosely based on the series Mission: Impossible.
Dinko	Generic	Astro Farm (British)	The family dog; about a family who work on an asteroid.
Dinky Dog	Old English Sheepdog	Dinky Dog	Sandy's dog; about two girls living with their uncle, and a cute pup who suddenly grows to the size of a horse.
Diogee	Generic	Milo Murphy's Law	Milo's dog; about a boy who has thing always go unexpected.
Dirty Dawg	Generic	The Kwicky Koala Show	Ratso's sidekick; about the adventures of Kwicky Koala.
Dog	Generic	CatDog	One half of conjoined brothers; about the adventures of a conjoined twin hybrid of a cat and dog.
Dogger	Generic	The Adventures of Portland Bill (British)	Portland Bill's dog; about situations arising in a fictional lighthouse on the Guillemot Rock.
Doggie Daddy	Dachshund	The Quick Draw McGraw Show	Augie Doggie's father.
Doggy Don	Dachshund	Pakdam Pakdai	An anthropomorphic little pink dog who is usually harassed by the mice. He is Colonel's younger brother.
Dog Star Patrol	Extraterrestrial	Krypto the Superdog	A group of extraterrestrial dogs, each with a singular power. They are based on the Space Canine Patrol Agents.
Dogtanian	Generic	Dogtanian and the Three Muskehounds (Spanish and Japanese)	The dog version of d'Artagnan, an adaptation of the French classic story by Alexandre Dumas.
Doidle	Generic	The Fairly OddParents	Pet dog of Vicky and her family; about the adventures of 10-year-old boy who wishes for a perfect life but has his problems.
Doki	Generic	Doki (Canadian)	A curious dog; about animal friends who are members of the Worldwide Expedition Club.
Dollar	Dalmatian	Richie Rich	The family dog.
Domestic Dog (Mixed-Breed)	Mixed-breed dog	Kemono Friends	A Friend who appeared in Kemono Friends 2.
Doogie	Generic	FARMkids (Australian)	About pampered zoo animals accidentally being shipped to a dude ranch.
Dotty Dog	Generic	The Get-Along Gang	One of the gang of animals who form a club to tell stories.
Dougal	Skye Terrier	The Magic Roundabout (French and British)	The main character (in 2005 the first computer-animated movie to be made in the United Kingdom.)
Douglas	Generic shaggy dog	Microscopic Milton	Mrs. Witherspoon's large shaggy dog; about a tiny kid who lived in a clock on the mantelpiece.
Douglas Dog	Generic	Henry's Cat (British)	Friend of Henry's cat; about a laid-back ponderous yellow cat and his many friends and enemies.
Droopy	Basset Hound	Droopy Master Detective	Spoof of detective films and cop show, sometimes featuring the characters from Tom & Jerry Kids.
Dudley	Generic	T.U.F.F. Puppy	A secret agent; about a dim-witted secret agent working for an organization called T.U.F.F. with his partner, Kitty Katswell.
Duggee	St. Bernard	Hey Duggee	He is the leader of The Squirrel Club. Unlike the children, he does not speak and only communicates via barking.
Duke	Generic	Captain N: The Game Master	Kevin's dog; about a teenager from California and his dog who are taken to another universe known as Videoland.
Duke	Sheepdog	Back at the Barnyard	The sheep's watchdog in the animated TV series, a spinoff from the movie Barnyard
Dukey	Generic	Johnny Test	Johnny's dog; about the adventures of a troublesome and bratty boy who lives with his brilliant 13-year-old twin sisters and an intelligent talking dog.
Dum Dum	Sheepdog	Touche Turtle and Dum Dum	The turtle's dumb associate; about a pair of heroic fencers who battle villains and heroically saves those in distress.
Dynomutt	Doberman Pinscher	Dynomutt, Dog Wonder	A robot dog; about a super hero called Blue Falcon and his assistant a bumbling yet generally effective robot dog.
Ein	Welsh Corgi	Cowboy Bebop (Japanese)	A highly intelligent dog; about the adventures of a group of bounty hunters traveling on their spaceship.
Eliot Shag	German Shepherd	Dog City	The muppet animator in the TV series with puppetry.
Elvis	Generic	Butch Cassidy	Wally's dog; about a group of teens who lead double lives as popular rock stars and a secret crime fighting team.
Estopa	Unknown	As Aventuras de Gui & Estopa	Gui's best friend.
Fat Dog Mendoza	Generic	Fat Dog Mendoza (British)	About a smart-mouthed dog who is incredibly obese and his friends who try to fight crime.
Fern Walters	Generic	Arthur	One of Arthur's classmates; about an eight-year-old male anthropomorphic aardvark.
Fetch	Generic	Histeria!	Loud Kiddington's dog, a satirical look at history with a cast of comic characters.
Fifi	Poodle	Rugrats	Spike's girlfriend; about eight babies as well as two dogs and their day-to-day lives.
Flash	Basset Hound	The Dukes	Roscoe's dog; about an automobile race around the world.
Flash the Wonder Dog	German Shepherd	Chip 'n Dale Rescue Rangers	About a dog TV star dressed up like a super hero, who gets his costume stolen by bad characters.
Fleabag	Generic large dog	The Oddball Couple	About the misadventures of a messy dog and a neat cat who lived together.
Fluffa	Generic	Summerton Mill (British)	Dan's companion; about a beautiful valley where when the rains turns the old waterwheel a little bit of magic takes place.
Fluffy	Generic Terrier	The Casagrandes	One of Margarita's pet dogs whom Ronnie Anne and Sid walked in the episode "Walk Don't Run". She only eats organic food.
Foofur	Generic hound	Foofur	Heir-apparent; about a dog who inherits his owner's estate but can't take possession.
Frisket	Generic	ReBoot	A feral dog. He protects and listens to Enzo.
Fu	Shar Pei	American Dragon: Jake Long	Lao's companion; about a 13-year-old boy who can change into a dragon and protect the magical creatures living in the city.
Fuji	Great Dane	The Osmonds	The musician's dog, depicting the real-life musical family as cartoon characters.
Fumbles	Generic	Where's Huddles?	Huddles' dog; about a professional football quarterback and his neighbor.
Fuzzby	Generic shaggy dog	Grandma Bricks of Swallow Street (British)	One of many series from Cosgrove Hall Films a British animation studio.
Gecko	Generic	Duckman	Duckman's purple dog; based on characters created by Everett Peck in his Dark Horse publication.
Genevieve	Generic	Madeline	Madeline's dog; about a girl who lives in Paris and attends a boarding school.
Gin	Akita	Ginga: Nagareboshi Gin (Japanese)	Daisuke's dog; about a dog who leaves his master to join a pack of wild dogs from all over Japan to fight a deranged bear and his minions.
Glurt	Generic	Mixels	A member of the 2014 Glorp Corp who loves to eat garbage.
Goddard	Robotic	The Adventures of Jimmy Neutron: Boy Genius	Jimmy Neutron's robotic dog.
Goliath	Generic	Davey and Goliath	Davey's talking dog; 15 minute episodes dealing with issues such as respect for authority, sharing and prejudice.
Goliath	Generic	Samson and Goliath	Samson's dog; about a superhero teenager and his dog as they ride around the country on a motorbike fighting evil.
Goober	Generic	Goober and the Ghost Chasers	The Partridge kids' dog; about a group of teenagers solving spooky mysteries with their dog who can become invisible.
Goofy	Generic	Goof Troop	Friend of Mickey Mouse and Donald Duck. Created by The Walt Disney Company. He usually wears a turtle neck, vest and a tall hat.
Goosers	Labrador Retriever	The Twisted Whiskers Show	Claude's dog; based on the Twisted Whiskers greeting cards; created by Terrill Bohlar.
Gui	West Highland White Terrier	As Aventuras de Gui & Estopa	Estopa's best friend, Cróquete's boyfriend and Pitiburro's frenemy.
Gus	West Highland White Terrier	King (Canadian)	Russell's dog; about a boy who finds a portal under his bed leading to an alternate universe called Under.
Happy Walter Higginbottom	Generic	The Mighty B!	Bessie's pet companion; about an ambitious girl scout who believes she will become a superhero if she collects every Honeybee badge.
Harry	Generic	Stanley	Stanley's dog; about a boy who learns how to deal with difficult situations.
Honey	Poodle	HouseBroken	A therapy dog helping other animal in the neighborhood.
Hong Kong Phooey	Generic	Hong Kong Phooey	The superhero; about a dog who uses Chinese martial arts to fight crime.
Hot Dog	Old English Sheepdog	The Archie Show	An animated TV series based upon the comic book, 1968–1989.
Howie	Generic	Almost Naked Animals	Manager of the Banana Cabana; about Howie and his staff and their unusual adventures in the tropical resort.
Hoze Hounds	Dalmatian	Hoze Houndz (Canadian)	Six fire dogs; about the misadventures of a fire-fighting team.
Huckleberry Hound	Bluetick Coonhound	The Huckleberry Hound Show	A blue dog that speaks with a Southern drawl with a relaxed sweet and well-intentioned personality.
Hunter, The	bloodhound	King Leonardo and His Short Subjects	(Also known as "The King and Odie Show"); a Southern-accented, crime-fighter.
Jake	Bulldog	Adventure Time	Finn's dog; about a 14-year-old boy and his dog with magical powers living in the post-apocalyptic Land of Ooo.
James Hound	Generic	Dr. Ha-Ha	About a bumbling kung-fu artist like Hong Kong Phooey.
Jawg	Generic	Mixels	The leader of the Fang Gang.
Jelly Roll	Generic	Jibber Jabber (Canadian)	The kids' dog; about fraternal twins who have very active imaginations and share the same vision of their adventures.
Jitters	Generic	Raw Toonage	A character in the cartoon series by the Walt Disney Television Animation.
Jollop	Generic	Engie Benjy	Engie's dog; about a boy and his dog who save the day with their extra special fixing skills.
Jorge	Dachshund	Clifford's Puppy Days	One of Clifford's friends from his puppyhood.
Kipper	Generic	Kipper	The main character; about a mischievous and funny dog and his friends; based on the books written by Mick Inkpen.
Kiwi	Bull Terrier	Code Lyoko	Odd Della Robbia's dog in the French animated TV series. Nicknamed "my lil' diggity dog".
Krypto	Kryptonian Labrador Retriever	Krypto the Superdog	Superman's dog and best friend. With Superman's permission, Krypto lives on Earth as the pet of Kevin Whitney.
Ladybird	Bloodhound	King of the Hill	Hank's dog; about a working-class Methodist family in a fictional small town.
Lalo	English Mastiff	The Loud House; The Casagrandes	The Casagrande family's pet dog; the latter work mentioned in the cell to the left is a spin-off of the former.
Liquidator	Generic, made of water	Darkwing Duck	A supervillain in the animated TV series by Disney
Little Dog	Dachshund	2 Stupid Dogs	About a big dog and a little dog who aren't very smart and their everyday misadventures.
Lomax	Generic hound	Lomax, the Hound of Music	About a music loving pooch, his feline sidekick, and their human companion on a tune-filled train ride.
Loula	Generic	Pocoyo (Spanish)	Pocoyo's companion; about a young boy dressed in blue who is full of curiosity.
Lucky	Generic	Pound Puppies	The leader of a group of dogs who spend most of their time at a shelter.
Ma-Mutt	Bulldog	ThunderCats	Loyal dog of Mumm-Ra, the villain, in the animated TV series; about a team of humanoid cats who fight evil in their adopted home world. A sequel series follows the cats as they are forced to roam the planet Third Earth.
Mac	Greyhound	Clifford the Big Red Dog	One of Clifford's friends.
Magenta	Generic	Blue Clues	Blue's best friend in the animated TV series, a program intended to get preschoolers to learn through active participation in activities grounded in their everyday lives.
Martha	Generic	Martha Speaks	Helen's talking dog; about a girl who feeds her dog alphabet soup that travels to the dog's brain.
Max Goof	Generic	Goof Troop	Max Goof is an anthropomorphic dog and the son of Goofy. He in the 1992 animated TV series before the movie A Goofy Movie
McBarker	English Bulldog	What's New Mr. Magoo	Quincy Magoo's dog; about a nearsighted gentleman who is never aware of the situations he gets into.
Meat	Generic large dog	Schnookums and Meat Funny Cartoon Show	The cat's antagonist; a spin-off of the show Marsupilami.
Merlin	Labrador Retriever	Merlin the Magical Puppy (Australian)	A mischievous puppy whose make-believe and playful dreams become a reality thanks to his magical red collar.
Mighty Manfred the Wonder Dog	Generic	Tom Terrific	Tom's lazy sidekick; about a boy who lives in a treehouse and can transform himself into anything he wants.
Miguel	Anibus Chihuahua	Rainbow Butterfly Unicorn Kitty	A chihuahua who is Felicity's best friend.
Milo	Jack Russell Terrier	The Mask: Animated Series	Stanley Ipkiss' dog. He has occasionally wielded the eponymous Mask, which is usually used by Stanley and gives him vast reality-altering abilities.
Minus	Generic	Poko (Canadian)	Poko's dog in; about a young boy with a magic finger, his pet dog and his toy monkey.
Monroe	Pug	The Life and Times of Juniper Lee	June's pet pug dog and sidekick and mentor; about a feisty 11-year-old human youngster battling with the monsters, devils, demons and strange creatures in Orchid Bay City, created by Judd Winick.
Mop Top	Generic	The Brady Kids	The family dog; about a blended family from two former marriages including three boys and three girls and the housekeeper.
Moxy	Generic	The Moxy Show	About a dog who liked to spend time goofing off and having fun with his sidekick Flea.
Mr. Peabody	Generic	The Rocky and Bullwinkle Show	An intelligent and clever dog in the Mr. Peabody and Sherman segments; about the time-travelling adventures of an advanced canine and his adopted son.
Mr. Peanutbutter	Labrador Retriever	BoJack Horseman	BoJack's former sitcom rival and Diane's boyfriend; about the star of a once hit television show now washed up and complaining about everything.
Ms. Lion	Lhasa Apso	Spider-Man and His Amazing Friends	Firestar's dog; about a trio called the Spider-Friends who fight against various villains.
Mumbly	Generic	The Mumbly Cartoon Show	A detective dog famous for his wheezy laugh who dresses up in a trenchcoat and solves crimes using his dog senses, paroding television detective Columbo.
Mungo	Generic	Mary, Mungo and Midge (British)	Mary's dog; about a girl and her dog and her pet mouse Midge who lived in a tower block in a busy town.
Mussel Mutt	Sheepdog	The Houndcats	The hungry herding dog; loosely based on the series Mission: Impossible.
Muttley	Mixed breed	Dick Dastardly	About a villainous character and his dog accomplice.
Naga	Polar Bear Dog	The Legend of Korra	Avatar Korra's Polar Bear dog, best friend, and main source of transportation; about Avatar Aang's successor Avatar Korra as she fights to restore balance to the world.
Nelson	Bearded Collie	The Casagrandes	Mr. Nakamura's pet dog.
Newt	Dachshund	Animaniacs	The best hunting Dachshund in the world
Ninja	St. Bernard	The Casagrandes	Miranda's pet dog whom Ronnie Anne and Sid walked in the episode "Walk Don't Run". He is known to fall asleep anywhere.
Nova	Cocker spaniel	Scooby-Doo! Mystery Incorporated	The pet of Brad and Judy Chiles, and Scooby-Doo's love interest.
Odie	Unknown	Garfield and Friends	Yellow-furred, brown-eared dog in the Garfield comic strip, TV shows, and movies. Created by Jim Davis.
Paddlefoot	Dachshund	Clutch Gargo	Spinner's dog; about a writer sent around the world on dangerous assignments accompanied by his young ward and his dog.
Pal	Generic	Arthur	Arthur's dog; about an aardvark who goes on adventures by himself.
Patrasche	Bouvier des Flandres	A Dog of Flanders (Japanese)	Nello's companion; about a Flemish boy and his dog; based on the book by Marie Louise de la Ramée under the Japanese pseudonym Ouida.
Paw Patrol	Various breeds	Paw Patrol	The Paw Patrol consists of numerous dogs, each with a unique personality and skills, and a tech-savvy boy working together on rescue missions to protect their city.
Pazuzu	Generic	Neighbors from Hell	The family dog; about a family of demons who move to Texas from Hell to destroy a drill that can dig to the Earth's core.
Penn Zero	Generic	Penn Zero: Part-Time Hero	The main protagonist of the series, he is turned into a plush dog in Plush Toy World
Peter Puppy	Generic	Earthworm Jim	Peter Puppy is Jim's sidekick. Originally a normal dog, he was altered into an anthropomorphic form after being possessed by a demon.
Petey	Generic	The Puppy's Further Adventures.	A lonely orphan boy's dog; based on a children's book The Puppy Who Wanted a Boy; written by Jane Thayer.
Petey	Pit Bull	The Little Rascals	The kids' dog; about a scruffy bunch of kids and their dog; based upon the old live-action film Our Gang.
Pickles	Pug	The Casagrandes	One of Margarita's pet dogs whom Ronnie Anne and Sid walked in the episode "Walk Don't Run". She loves rolling around in puddles and dislikes being bathed.
Pif	Generic	Braceface	French TV series ("Pif et Hercule"); about an anthorpomorhic dog and cat.
Pigger	Generic	Braceface (Canadian)	One of Sharon's pets; about a junior high school student with braces that get in her way of leading a normal teenage life.
Pimpa	Generic white with red spots	Pimpa	Italian comic strip and TV series; about a talking dog who lives in a magical world.
Pinky	Chihuahua	Phineas and Ferb	Isabella's dog; about two step-brothers who find inventive things to do on each day of their summer vacation.
Pluto	Generic	Mickey Mouse Works and other series	The pet of Mickey Mouse; produced by Walt Disney.
Poochini	Generic	Poochini's Yard	About a dog who runs away from home after its rich owner dies and is eventually adopted by an American family.
Porkchop	Generic	Doug	Doug's dog; about Doug Funnie and his family.
Potsworth	English Springer Spaniel	Midnight Patrol: Adventures in the Dream Zone	A neighborhood dog; about a dog and four kids who patrol in dreamland where they have special powers.
Precious Pup	Generic	The Atom Ant/Secret Squirrel Show	Granny Sweet's dog; about a pint sized hero Atom Ant and super-sleuth Secret Squirrel.
Puff	Poodle	Proud Family	The family dog; about a 14-year-old and her wacky family and friends.
Pupcake	Generic	Strawberry Shortcake	Strawberry's energetic pup; about a little girl, her friends and pets. The Strawberry Shortcake brand began from greeting cards, etc. by American Greetings.
Puppy Purple	Generic	The Blobs	One of the blobs; about a community of colorful paint-splash characters who live in Paintbox Land.
Prince Puppycorn	Pug/Unicorn	Unikitty!	The brother of Princess Unikitty (cat/unicorn).
Raggedy Dog	Generic	The Adventures of Raggedy Ann and Andy	One of the stuffed dolls who come to life in Marcella's bedroom; based on the books by Johnny Gruelle.
Ralph	Mutt	The Secret Files of the Spy Dogs	A high-ranking spy dog; about a secret organization of dogs that are dedicated to protecting their world.
Ralphie	St. Bernard	Lazer Tag Academy	Jaren's dog; about a girl who travels back in time from the year 3010 to the 1980s to help her ancestors.
Rantanplan	Generic	Lucky Luke (French-Belgian)	A prison guard dog; about a cowboy known to "shoot faster than his shadow".
Reddy	Generic	Ruff and Reddy	A stupid dog; about the adventures of a smart cat and a not-so-smart dog.
Ren	Chihuahua	The Ren and Stimpy Show	About the adventures of the psychotic dog and a good-natured dimwitted cat.
Rhubarb	Generic	The Houndcats	The do-it-all scientist in the group; based on the series Mission: Impossible.
Riff	Australian Shepherd	Tractor Tom (British)	A dog who likes to round-up animals; about Tractor Tom and his human animal and vehicle friends at both work and play.
Road Rovers	Various breeds	Road Rovers	About a team of five super-powered crime-fighting anthropomorphic dogs known as cano-sapiens.
Rocket	Shimmer and Shine	Zac's pet dog.	
Roger	Generic	Bobbys World	The family dog; about the daily life of Bobby and his very overactive imagination.
Rolly	Pug	Puppy Dog Pals	About two puppies who have fun in when their owner leaves home
Roobarb	Generic	Roobarb (British)	About a green dog whose adventures are usually snarled by a cynical pink cat.
Rosie and Ruff	Generic	Rosie & Ruff in Puppydog Tales (British)	Canine buddies; about the happy mischief of four dogs (including Scratch and Sniff).
Rosie O'Gravy	Rough Collie	Dog City	Ace's love interest; puppetry; created by Jim Henson.
Rover Dangerfield	Basset Hound	Rover Dangerfield	Pampered Las Vegas dog who gets thrust into the less glamorous farm life.
Roy	Generic	Ricky Sprocket: Showbiz Boy	Ricky's dog; about the world's biggest child film star who doesn't let celebrity fame go to his head.
Rude Dog	Bull Terrier	Rude Dog and the Dweebs	Owner of an auto shop. (Also in the series are dogs Tweak, Caboose, Reggie, Snatch, Winston, Gloria, and Kibble.)
Ruff	Briard	Dennis the Menace	The family dog; about a boy who causes problems for everyone.
Ruff Ruffman	Generic	Fetch! with Ruff Ruffman	Host in the animated TV game show on PBS during the PBS Kids GO! block of educational programming
Ruffy	Generic	Timmy Time	An energetic puppy in the British Children's animated TV series; about a boy and his friends who have to learn to share, make friends and accept their mistakes
Rump	Bull Terrier	DinoSquad	The squad's pet; about five teenagers who have the power to turn into a dinosaurs using this power to fight a villain.
Runt	Generic, large	Animaniacs	A loyal but stupid dog; part of an ensemble cast of off-the-wall Warner Brothers characters, appearing in a wide variety of roles.
Saffie (Sammy)	Generic hound	Ox Tales, (Boes in Dutch), Wil Raymakers, and Thijs Wilms	Boes' dog.
Sam	Irish Wolfhound	The Adventures of Sam & Max: Freelance Police	Sam is a large, intelligent Irish Wolfhound and, along with a "hyperkinetic rabbity-thing" Max, make up the Freelance Police.
Samson	Generic	Braceface (Canadian)	One of Sharon's pets; about a junior high school student with braces that get in her way of leading a normal teenage life.
Santa's Little Helper	Greyhound	The Simpsons	The family dog; about a dysfunctional family and noted for its fast and subtle humor and ridiculous plots.
Sapphie	Cavalier King Charles Spaniel	Jewelpet (Japanese)	Aoi's pet; about the magical world of Jewel Land where three magicians turned the Jewelpets into Jewel Charms.
Scooby-Doo	Great Dane	Scooby-Doo Where Are You	Lifelong companion of Shaggy Rogers.
Scooby-Dum, Scooby-Dee, and Doo family	Great Dane	Miscellaneous Scooby-Doo projects	The family members of Scooby-Doo
Scooch Pooch	Terrier	Go, Dog. Go!	Tag Barker's best friend and neighbor.
Scout	Dalmatian	Finley the Fire Engine	The firehouse dog in the British animated TV series for children.
Scrappy-Doo	Great Dane	Scrappy-Doo	The nephew of cartoon star Scooby-Doo; about a big dog and several teenage humans.
Scratch	Unknown	Dot.	Dot's pet; about an 8-year-old girl who goes on adventures.
Scruff	Generic	Scruff	Peter's dog; about a curious puppy living on a farm. Originally a Catalan and Spanish series created by Josep Vallverdú.
Scruff	Generic	Little Princess	The princess' dog; about a little girl and her discovery of the world.
Scruffty	Generic	Bob the Builder (British)	Bob's dog; about a construction worker his friends and a gang of anthropomorphic work-vehicles.
Sergeant Murphy	Generic	The Busy World of Richard Scarry	One of the characters; about anthropomorphic animals in the fictional city of Busytown.
Servo	Schnauzer-like Autobot	Transformers: Rescue Bots	High Tide's former assistant, and now a member of the Griffin Rock rescue team.
Seymour (aka Seymour Asses)	Border Terrier	Futurama	Fry's 20th century dog; about a 20th-century pizza delivery boy who finds himself in the 31st century.
Shadow	Generic large dog	The Centurions	Jake Rockwell's dog; about an evil cyborg, his sidekicks and an army of drones who seek to conquer the Earth.
Shamus	Bloodhound	Q. T. Hush	One of Q.T.'s assistants in 5 minute episodes about a detective and animal his assistants.
Sharky	Shark dog	Eek! The Cat	Annabelle's pet guard dog; about a purple cat whose motto is "it never hurts to help," an attitude that usually gets him into trouble.
Shep	Rough Collie	Horseland	Bailey's ranch dog; about a group of young children at a riding school.
Sherlock Hound	Hound	Sherlock Hound (Japanese)	The genius sleuth. (Also in the series are John Watson and other dog characters.)
Skits	Generic	Martha Speaks	Helen's second dog; about a girl who feeds her dog alphabet soup that travels to the dog's brain.
Snoopy	Beagle	I Want a Dog for Christmas, Charlie Brown	and other prime-time animated TV specials based upon the comic strip Peanuts.
Snowy	Fox Terrier	The Adventures of Tintin (Originally Belgian)	Tintin's dog, and the animated movie; about a reporter and his dog.
Snuffles	Bloodhound	The Quick Draw McGraw Show	Quick Draw's companion used to ferret out bad guys in the old West.
Sparky	Generic	South Park	Stan's dog; about the bizarre adventures of four boys.
Sparky	Generic	The Fairly OddParents	Timmy's talking fairy dog; about the everyday adventures of Timmy Turner, a boy who is granted two fairy godparents.
Spike	Bulldog	Heathcliff	A neighbor's dog; about a wisecracking trouble-making cat.
Spike	Siberian Tiger Hound	Rugrats	Fifi's boyfriend and the Pickles' family dog; about eight babies as well as two dogs and their day-to-day lives.
Spot	Cocker Spaniel	Spot	A British TV series based on the children's book "Spot the Dog".
Spot Helperman	Mongrel	Teacher's Pet	A blue pooch; the main protagonist of the show; Leonard's pet dog who dresses up like a boy named Scott Leadready II in order to go to school. Voiced by Nathan Lane and later Kevin Schon.
Sprocket	Sheep Dog	Fraggle Rock	Doc's; a high-energy raucous musical romp with "Muppet" characters called Fraggles.
Spugg	Chow	Mixels	A Lixer who loves to play with his friends (Turg and Tungster).
Spunky	Miniature Bull Terrier	Rocko's Modern Life	Rocko's dog; about the surreal adventures of an anthropomorphic wallaby and his animal friends and faithful dog.
Stogie	Golden Retriever	Mission Hill	Andy's dog; about a young man who works in an ad agency.
Stringer and Tubby	Beagle	The Beagles	A canine singing duet; a take-off of the famous musical group The Beatles.
Tag Barker	Beagador	Go, Dog. Go!	Scooch Pooch's best friend and daughter of Paw and Maw Barker. She is skilled at making inventions.
Tagg	Generic	The Adventures of Gulliver	Gary's dog; about a boy and his dog on an island with little people.
Talking Dog	Generic	The Powerpuff Girls	The girls' dog; about three kindergarten-aged girls with superpowers.
T-Bone	Bulldog	Clifford the Big Red Dog	One of Clifford's friends.
Tetsunoshin	Toy Poodle	Wan Wan Celeb Soreyuke! Tetsunoshin	Owned by the Inuyama family, struggling to help them pay their debts to avoid bankruptcy.
The Dog	Bull Terrier	Family Dog	The Binsford's pet; about an average suburban family as told through the eyes of their dog.
Tiger	Scottish Terrier	Kipper the Dog	Kipper's friend in a series of children's books and; about a mischievous and funny dog and his friends
Timmy	Border Collie	Famous 5: On the Case (British/French)	The children's dog; loosely based on the children's books of the same name by Enid Blyton.
Towser	Generic	Towser	About a clever dog; created by writer and illustrator Tony Ross.
Trouble	Generic	Superstretch and Microwoman	The couple's dog; about a shape-shifting husband and wife crime-fighting team.
Tucker	Dalmatian	Clifford the Big Red Dog	One of Clifford's friends.
Turbodogs	Labrador Retriever	Turbo Dogs	Six dogs friends; about speedy canine friends who learn lessons in friendship, fair play, and teamwork.
Tutu	Generic	Little Bear	Granny's dog; about a curious grizzly bear cub who lives in the forest with his family and friends.
Tyrone	Bulldog	The Secret Lives of Waldo Kitty	Waldo Kitty's antagonist; a parody of James Thurber's story The Secret Life of Walter Mitty with anthropomorphic dogs and cats.
Underdog	Beagle	Underdog	About a dog with super powers who always speaks in rhymes.
Vinny	Generic	Family Guy	Brian's replacement; about the Griffins a dysfunctional family.
Watterson	Old English Sheepdog	The Loud House	A puppy temporarily owned by the Loud family in the episode "Pets Peeved". He returns to his original owner, Claire, at the end of said episode.
Wee Reg	Generic	Fluffy Gardens	One of the characters; a series of seven-minute episode tells the story of a different character.
Weed	Akita	Ginga Legend Weed (Japanese)	Son of Gin; about a dog and his allies who journey throughout Japan aiding those in need.
Weenie	Dachshund	Oswald	Oswald's friend; about an octopus in a world populated by anthropomorphic animals, mythological creatures and other odd characters.
What-A-Mess	Afghan Hound	What-A-Mess (British)	Title character; about an accident-prone puppy
Whimper	Basset Hound	Clue Club (retitled Woofer & Wimper, Dog Detectives)	Dottie's helpers in solving mysteries; about four teenagers who solve mysteries with the help of two talking hounds
White Fang	Wolf-dog hybrid	White Fang	About a wild dog's journey to domestication during the Klondike Gold Rush at the end of the 19th century.
William & Elizabeth	Generic	Bob and Margaret (Canadian/UK)	The couple's pet dogs; about a married English couple, a middle class 40-ish working couple with no children and two dogs.
Willie	Dachshund	Whistle for Willie	Peter's dog; about a boy who longs to whistle for his dog.
Willy	Generic	Sport Billy	Billy's loyal companion; about a young boy who is from the planet Olympus which is populated by athletic god-like beings
Winona	Generic	My Little Pony: Friendship Is Magic	Applejack's farm dog.
Wonder Dog	Labrador Retriever	Super Friends	One of the super-heroes; based on the Justice League comic books.
Woof	Generic	Where's Waldo	Waldo's dog; about a boy and his dog who travel to distant lands solving mysteries and helping people.
Woofer	Generic	Winky Dink and You	Winky's dog; about a boy and his dog; inviting children to draw solutions to problems.
Woofer	Bloodhound	Clue Club (retitled Woofer & Wimper, Dog Detectives)	Dottie's helpers in solving mysteries; about four teenagers who solve mysteries with the help of two talking hounds.
Woofster	Generic	Super Why!	Whyatt's dog; a children's adventure series in which five Super Readers help preschoolers learn the fundamentals of reading.
Wordsworth	Generic	Jamie and the Magic Torch (British)	Jamie's dog; about young boy finds adventure in a fun dimension called Cuckoo Land.
Yippee, Yappee, Yahooey	Dachshund, Sheepdog, Terrier	Yippee, Yappee and Yahooey	The king's royal dogs; about 3 dogs that must always protect, serve and obey the King.
Yowp	Generic	Yogi Bear	The sheriff's dog; about an amusing bear and his antics in Jellystone Park.
Yukk!	Generic	Mighty Man	Mighty Man's faithful sidekick; about a millionaire and his ugly dog who fight crime by becoming very small.
Zed	Anubian Baskurr	Ben 10: Omniverse	Zed is an Anubian Baskurr, an alien resembling a dog. Initially used by Khyber as a hunting dog, Zed is adopted by Kevin Levin after Khyber abandons her.
Zoe Trent	Cavalier King Charles Spaniel	Littlest Pet Shop	A purple dog who loves singing, fashion, and being a star.
