= Clifford the Big Red Dog (2019 TV series) =

Flash-animated children's television series

- Genre: Educational
- Based on: Clifford the Big Red Dog by Deborah Forte Clifford the Big Red Dog by Norman Bridwell
- Directed by: Mike Weiss; Geri Bertolo
- Voices of: Adam Sanders; Hannah Levinson; Bahia Watson; Julie Lemieux; Jasiah Stewart
- Theme music composer: Brad Alexander (music); Kevin Del Aguila (lyrics)
- Opening theme: "Clifford the Big Red Dog" performed by Eli Bolin
- Ending theme: "Clifford the Big Red Dog" (instrumental)
- Composers: Brad Alexander; Martin Erskine
- Countries of origin: United States; Canada; Ireland
- Original language: English
- No. of seasons: 1
- No. of episodes: 39 (78 segments)

Production
- Executive producers: Iole Lucchese; Jennifer Oxley; Vince Commisso
- Producers: Christine Thompson; Martin Sal
- Editors: Kurt Skyers; Alejandro Tello
- Running time: 22 minutes (2 11-minute segments)
- Production companies: Amazon Studios; 100 Chickens Productions; Brown Bag Films; 9 Story Media Group; Scholastic Entertainment

Original release
- Network: Amazon Prime Video
- Release: December 6, 2019 – February 12, 2021

Related
- Clifford the Big Red Dog (2000); Clifford's Puppy Days

Clifford the Big Red Dog is an animated children's television series adapted from the book series of the same name written by Norman Bridwell, and a reboot to the 2000 animated series created by Deborah Forte and produced by Mike Young Productions, releasing on Amazon Prime Video from December 6, 2019 to February 12, 2021. It is the third series in the franchise after the prequel spin-off Clifford's Puppy Days, which was also produced by Mike Young Productions.

In addition to being a reboot, it is also a sequel, as PBS Kids catalogues the series as being the third season. Clifford is voiced by Adam Sanders, replacing John Ritter in the role after his death in 2003.

In addition to releasing on Amazon Prime Video, the series later premiered on linear television the day after on PBS Kids. The second batch was released on February 7, 2020.

The series revolves around Emily Elizabeth Howard, a young girl who owns Clifford, a big red dog who can speak to her for the first time since the 1988 direct-to-video series. Together the two friends explore their island home, Birdwell Island, and embark on adventures.

On May 6, 2026, another Clifford series was revealed, with 9 Story and Brown Bag Films returning to produce the series. This series is set to premiere on PBS Kids in 2027.

== Characters ==
=== Main ===
- Clifford (voiced by Adam Sanders) is a big red dog that grew once Emily, his owner, gave him massive amounts of her love and affection. He now wears a studded collar. Unlike the books, the 2000 television series, and Clifford's Puppy Days, Clifford can now speak to Emily, but only when they're alone, much like the original 1988 home video series.
- Emily Elizabeth Howard (voiced by Hannah Levinson) is an affectionate 8-year-old girl and the owner of Clifford. Unlike the original series and Clifford's Puppy Days, she now wears a light yellow dress and black leggings, and has a cyan hair clip, bracelets, socks, and shoes.
  - Caroline Howard (voiced by Alison Brooks) is Emily's mother. Like in the books, Mrs. Howard has black hair, while in the original TV series and Clifford's Puppy Days, she was a blonde-haired woman.
  - Mark Howard (voiced by John Cleland) is Emily's father. Like in the books, Mr. Howard has short brown hair and wears glasses, while in the original TV series and Clifford's Puppy Days, he had fully grown brown hair and perfect eyesight.

=== Supporting ===
==== Humans ====
- Samantha Mulberry (voiced by Jenna Weir) is Emily's best friend and Bailey's owner. She wears an orange shirt, blue jeans, bracelets, and blue shoes.
  - Rayla Mulberry and Dr. Mulberry (voiced by Julie Lemieux and Maggie Cassella): Samantha's mothers.
- Jack Morgan (voiced by Jasiah Stewart) is one of Emily's friends.
- Pablo Flores (voiced by Niko Ceci) is one of Emily's friends. He is Mexican-American. He has a blue shirt, blue pants and green shoes. In addition, Pablo is Hero's owner.
- Fire Chief Franklin (voiced by John Cleland) is Tucker's owner. He is Birdwell Island's principal firefighter.
- Ms. Clayton (voiced by Raven Dauda) is Willa's owner, and Birdwell Island's librarian. She owns the Library, which is located on a boat.
- Ms. Ellerby (voiced by Alison Brooks) is Birdwell Island's lifeguard.
- Mr. Basu (voiced by Sugith Varughese) is Birdwell Island's mail carrier.
- Fisherman Charlie (voiced by Sugith Varughese) is Hudson's owner.
- Rose (voiced by Bryn McAuley)

==== Animals ====
- Bailey (voiced by Bahia Watson) is one of Clifford's dog friends. She is an Australian Shepherd who wears a pink bow. Samantha is her owner.
- Tucker (voiced by Julie Lemieux) is one of Clifford's dog friends. He is a Dalmatian puppy who wears a yellow collar. Fire Chief Franklin is his owner.
- Willa (vocal effects by Hannah Levinson) is a grey kitten who is owned by Ms. Clayton, the librarian. In segments between Emily Elizabeth and Clifford's adventures, she is seen having her own adventures with animals who are more her size.
- Hero (voiced by Matt Folliott) is Pablo's dog. He is a beagle. His name derives from Pablo's hobby of reading about superheroes in comic books.
- Hudson (voiced by Markeda McKay) is Charlie's dog. She is an Australian Shepherd, just like Bailey.
- Shelly is Samantha's hermit crab.

== Production ==
A reboot of Clifford the Big Red Dog was announced on May 16, 2018, by Scholastic, and released in late 2019. Scholastic and 100 Chickens Productions in the United States, and 9 Story Media Group in Canada produce the series.

On November 22, 2019, the theme song and a sneak peek clip of an episode were released.

In preparing for the role of the voice of Clifford, Adam Sanders stated that he watched episodes of the 2000s television series and studied John Ritter's performance as Clifford, stating that Ritter portrayed the character as very optimistic, youthful and compassionate.

Several characters from the previous iteration, including both Emily Elizabeth and Clifford's friends, are excised from the reboot, with new characters Samantha, Jack, Pablo, Tucker, and Bailey assuming similar roles. The 2000 series' format is additionally overhauled, as some segments are either replaced or significantly changed to accommodate the differences in production.

== Episodes ==
The series has 39 22-minute episodes.

No.	Title	Directed by	Written by	Storyboard by	Original release date	Prod. code
Part $1$
1	"Red Beard the Pirate" "The Space Race!"	Mike Weiss	Kevin Del Aguila	Mike Weiss Adamo Lupusella	December 6, 2019	301
"Red Beard the Pirate": After they read a book about pirates, Clifford and Emily are inspired to play a game of pirates. Bailey and Tucker play along with them when Tucker loses his favorite squeaky toy in one of the places where they buried their "treasure". "The Space Race!": After listening to Miss Clayton, the librarian read a book about astronauts, Emily and Samantha decide to play a game of astronauts to be the first people to land on "Mars" using the red rocks on the beach, and Clifford as their spaceship. The game turns into a space race of boys vs. girls when Jack and Pablo vow to be first. The girls' "spaceship" gets stuck in mud, so all parties agree to team up. Willa moment: Willa and a seagull have a small fight over who should play with a dandelion, but when the dandelion loses its fluff, they decide to share a different flower instead.
2	"Get Along Little Kitties" "Very Big Riding Hood"	Mike Weiss	Melinda LaRose Eric Weiner	Michelle Ku Paul Riley	December 6, 2019	302
"Get Along Little Kitties": Miss Clayton hosts a kitten adoption event, but the six kittens up for adoption manage to escape. Emily and Clifford help out using methods inspired by what they read in a cowboy book, and attempt to find a home for the grey kitten that's the most playful of them. "Very Big Riding Hood": After hearing that Bailey has a stomach ache, Emily and Clifford set out to cheer her up with a box of heart-shaped treats. However, the treats become popular with the other animals, and for each animal they come across on their way to her house, Emily and Clifford gives them one. When they reach Bailey's house, there aren't any treats left for her, but they still attempt to cheer her up. Willa moment: While exploring the librarian's living room, Willa becomes frightened when she suddenly begins seeing another kitten that looks just like her. Fortunately, a curious mouse is able to show Willa that she's been looking at her own reflection the whole time.
3	"Hiccup Pup" "Top of the Charts"	Mike Weiss	Kevin Del Aguila Stacey Greenberger	Nazish Naqvi Adamo Lupusella	December 6, 2019	303
"Hiccup Pup": While Emily Elizabeth and Clifford are attempting to break the world record for the most dog biscuits stacked, Clifford suddenly gets the hiccups, which topples the tower. Everybody seems to have different ideas on how to cure hiccups, but Emily Elizabeth will do anything to help her big friend cure his big case of hiccups. "Top of the Charts": After Emily Elizabeth compliments a local band for their music, she and Clifford become inspired to form their own band. After gathering their friends, the band looks complete, but there's just one thing missing: practice. Willa moment: Willa is interested in the flower the mouse has just put in a pot, but when she accidentally knocks it over, she temporarily hides her actions. However, Willa reveals the truth when the mouse starts blaming the frog for what happened to the flower.
4	"Knights of the Wobbly Table" "Don't Lead Me a Stray"	Mike Weiss	Kevin Del Aguila Melinda LaRose	Al Jeffrey Michelle Ku	December 6, 2019	304
"Knights of the Wobbly Table": Emily Elizabeth and Clifford go to the library to check out an adventure story they had previously read, but learn from Miss Clayton that they haven't returned the book. Like knights of old, Emily Elizabeth, Clifford, and their friends embark on a quest to find the book, only to find it's been under Miss Clayton's nose this whole time. "Don't Lead Me a Stray": Emily Elizabeth and Clifford go to a pet adoption event after reading a book on certain pets. While Emily Elizabeth helps Pablo find the right pet for him, Clifford befriends a beagle and helps him find the right human for him. Willa moment: Willa enjoys playing with a tennis ball until the seagull suddenly takes it from her and plays with it. After seeing that he's hurt Willa's feelings, the seagull decides to share the ball through a game of catch instead.
5	"Things That Go Bump" "Sherlock Bones"	Mike Weiss	Susan Kim P. Kevin Strader	Nazish Naqvi Adamo Lupusella	December 6, 2019	305
"Things That Go Bump": Inspired by a book about camping, Emily Elizabeth and Clifford have a backyard campout with their friends (kids and dogs alike), but although no ghost stories are read by anybody of the group, something seems to be making spooky things happen around the campsite and Emily Elizabeth and Clifford have to be brave to save Sam's new hermit crab Shelley and expose the "ghost". "Sherlock Bones": On the warmest day of the year, Clifford, Bailey, and Tucker become distressed when the Town Bowl, a giant water dish for the dogs of Birdwell Island, disappears just after they ate salty snacks served by Jack. With Emily Elizabeth leading, the friends play Sherlock Holmes and look for clues to find the culprit. Willa moment: Willa and the seagull are curious about a bicycle they find outside the bicycle shop, but can't seem to make it go. Thankfully, the frog comes by to give them a helping hand...or foot.
6	"The Little Red Dream" "The Mail Mix Up"	Mike Weiss	Kevin Del Aguila Melinda LaRose	Al Jeffery Paul Riley	December 6, 2019	306
"The Little Red Dream": Clifford accidentally causes a large mess on the main street. Emily tries cheering up Clifford by reading "Gulliver's Travels," but Clifford falls asleep and dreams that he is small, but soon learns that it's okay to be big. "The Mail Mix Up": Ms. Clayton is holding a party for the new mailman, but preparations for the party leave her with no time, so Emily and Clifford deliver the invitations for her. Emily and Clifford deliver all the invitations successfully, all but to one mysterious person named Mr. Basu!
7	"Coming Soon!" "Fire Dog Tucker"	Mike Weiss	Susan Kim Kevin Del Aguila	Nazish Naqvi Adamo Lupusella	December 6, 2019	307
"Coming Soon!": After Pablo shares the latest issue of his favorite comic book with his friends, he is over the moon when Mr. Howard tells them that the author is visiting. The mood turns sour when the librarian explains that the ferry broke down, forcing a cancellation. Feeling sorry for their friend, Emily Elizabeth comes up with the idea of putting on a play to cheer Pablo up. When the play hits a snag, only one friend can save the show...and receive praise from an unexpected visitor. "Fire Dog Tucker": Tucker is ready to take his Fire Dog Test and Emily Elizabeth and Clifford are ready to help their friend pass in any way he can. For every part of the test, however, Tucker gets scared easily and hides in the Fire Chief's fire pants. Emily Elizabeth helps cheer up Tucker with a history lesson about dalmatians and their roles as fire dogs, but when Willa gets trapped in a cave and the fire truck gets a puncture, it's up to Tucker to face his fears to save the day. Willa moment: Willa and the frog are having fun playing with a balloon, until it gets stuck in a lamp on a high crate. When neither of them can reach the balloon, it takes the help of one more friend to rescue their game.
Part $2$
8	"Muddy Buds Hit The Suds" "Lights, Camera, Clifford!"	Mike Weiss	Stacey Greenberger Craig Shemin	Al Jeffery Michelle Ku	February 7, 2020	308
"Muddy Buds Hit the Suds": Emily Elizabeth, Clifford, Sam, and Bailey are excited to be playing "race cars" in the mud after a rainfall, but Tucker isn't keen on getting dirty as that means he would have to take a bath afterwards. When Tucker does end up joining in the fun and getting muddy, he tries to hide to avoid a bath. Emily Elizabeth and Sam and their dogs help Tucker by comparing taking baths to race cars and their pit crews...by having the Fire Chief and some of the townsfolk give Clifford a bath. "Lights, Camera, Clifford!": After watching a movie at Birdwell Island's Movie Night, Sam feels inspired to make a movie of her own. With help from a book about making movies, Sam comes up with a good story for a movie and invites her human and dog friends to be the cast while she directs. The friends' creative differences, however, threaten to derail Sam's dream and only Emily Elizabeth can help Sam save her dream from going in the can. Willa moment: Willa comes down to the playground feeling sad. The seagull and the frog all do their best to help cheer her up, at which Will eventually sees that being with her friends was all she needed to cure her blues.
9	"Making Lemonade Out of Lemons" "The Watering Hole"	Mike Weiss	Ariel Shepherd-Oppenheim Stacey Greenberger	Luke Gustafson Adamo Lupusella	February 7, 2020	309
"Making Lemonade Out of Lemons": In order to raise funds for new soccer jerseys, Emily Elizabeth, Clifford and friends decide to set up a lemonade stand. "The Watering Hole": Emily Elizabeth is so excited to go swimming in the town pool--but it's not open yet! She and Clifford pass the time with their friends by pretending to be animals and head to the “watering hole.” Willa segment: Willa steps onto a seesaw. She plays until a frog jumps on it. Willa selfishly compels the frog to jump off the seesaw, but she finally learns to share it with the frog. They get along with each other afterwards.
10	"Up Pup and Away!" "Abra-Ca-Lifford!"	Mike Weiss	Kevin Del Aguila	Al Jeffrey Paul Riley	February 7, 2020	310
"Up Pup and Away": Emily Elizabeth has a surprise for Aunt Violet: paper airplanes with drawings of cherished moments they shared! But when Aunt Violet flies in, the propellers on her seaplane send all the paper planes scattering! "Abra-Ca-Lifford!": When Emily Elizabeth's dad shares his old magic set with her and Clifford, the two decide to become magicians! But what happens when a disappearing act goes a little too well? Willa moment: Willa and Shelly take a walk in a forest, but Willa keeps getting hit on the head by acorns. Shelly intends to use leaves and a flower to prevent Willa's repeating natural accident. She thankfully manages to stay on Willa's head in order for her to dodge the falling acorns.
11	"Mount Norma" "Hide and Sneak"	Mike Weiss	J. Milligan Matt Fleckenstein	Luke Gustafson Adamo Lupusella	February 7, 2020	311
"Mount Norma": The kids are inspired by a news story to pretend to be mountain climbers and scale a "mountain" of their own--the local hill. Meanwhile, the Fire Chief assigns Bailey and Tucker to deliver a box of cookies sent from his Aunt Norma to Emily Elizabeth to share with everybody, but Seagull takes the package and Bailey and Tucker try to catch up to him to save the box by going up the same hill. When the kids' final stretch turns into a race to the top and name the "mountain", they find the new name already awaiting them there. "Hide and Sneak": The friends are playing an epic game of Animal Star Rangers Hide-and-Seek to save the galaxy! When Clifford’s size makes playing hide-and-seek difficult, Emily Elizabeth finds a creative way to help him. Meanwhile, after Clifford brings Willa down from a tree, Willa starts playing a game of tag with a red butterfly, that partly takes her through the Animal Star Rangers' Hide-and-Seek. Willa moment: Willa and the gopher play a game of Hide-and-Seek in the park, but when the gopher starts taking advantage of the many holes he has dug, he realizes that he's hurt Willa's feelings by not playing fair.
12	"The Big Red Tomato" "Dogbot"	Mike Weiss	Stacey Greenberger Kevin Del Aguila	Al Jeffery Michelle Ku	February 7, 2020	312
"The Big Red Tomato": The tiny seed that Emily Elizabeth planted has grown into a HUGE tomato! Can Emily Elizabeth and Jack agree on what to cook with it before the Firehouse Feast starts? "Dogbot": Emily Elizabeth and Clifford pretend to be robots on robo-missions to help her parents get ready for a dinner party that evening. Willa moment: Willa intends to play in a front yard which is full of party decorations, but she accidentally gets caught in some of them and ultimately scotch tape. A mouse and frog end up in that same difficulty, but their teamwork successfully manages to free themselves from the sticky scotch tape.
13	"The Birdwell Island Blues" "The Big Red World"	Mike Weiss	Kevin Del Aguila; Marisa Lark Wallin Melinda LaRose	Luke Gustafson Adamo Lupusella	February 7, 2020	313
"The Birdwell Island Blues": Emily Elizabeth's day has started out terribly and she is in a bad mood! Her bad mood causes a chain reaction, and soon almost everyone on the Island is having a bad day! "The Big Red World": When Jack shows his friends his dad's trunk of global travel treasures, the kids are inspired to take a pretend "world tour" around Birdwell Island. Willa moment: Willa intends to play with the seagull in the botanical front yard, but the weather immediately changes from a sunny day to a rainy day. She makes an attempt to dry herself under a gigantic stem. Unfortunately, she gets wet. The frog and seagull keep themselves dry under a wooden wagon. They generously allow Willa to stay underneath the wagon.
Part 3
14	"A Reasonable Eggsplanation" "The Special Agents of Birdwell Island"	Mike Weiss and Geri Bertolo	Stacey Greenberger Kevin Del Aguila	Al Jeffrey Paul Riley	May 15, 2020	314
"A Reasonable Eggsplantion": Emily Elizabeth and Clifford just discovered a dinosaur egg. However, in their efforts of taking care of little "Eggie", they realize not everything may be what it seems. "The Special Agents of Birdwell Island": Emily Elizabeth's father has a discussion about getting rid of something big and red. Could it be Clifford? Emily Elizabeth and Clifford become special agents to find out this mystery. Willa moment: A frog jumps onto a plastic swimming float. Willa makes an attempt to get on it, but the frog tosses her into the pool. They have trouble getting along with other. A mouse thankfully encourages them to cooperate with each other.
15	"Towel Team Go!" "Puppy Preschool"	Mike Weiss and Geri Bertolo	Stacey Greenberger Kevin Del Aguila	Luke Gustafson Adamo Lupusella	May 15, 2020	315
"Towel Team Go!": Emily Elizabeth and friends are inspired to form a team of superheroes after noticing Fire Chief Franklin rescuing Fisherman Charlie. "Puppy Preschool": Clifford, Bailey and Tucker develop a puppy preschool when Fisherman Charlie's new puppy, Hudson, has a very difficult time of sharing and playing with everyone. Willa moment: When Willa experiences her first snow day, she sees Mouse outside and mistakes her pantomimes as wanting to blow on the windows and draw pictures in the cold breath until Willa understands that Mouse just wants to come inside to avoid the cold weather.
16	"Captain Chrysalis" "It's Berry Season!"	Mike Weiss and Geri Bertolo	Kris Marvin Hughes Sara El-Behiri	Al Jeffrey Michelle Ku	May 15, 2020	316
"Captain Chrysalis": Pablo must learn to empathize with his new butterfly friend when he realizes she may wish to join other butterflies on adventures in Butterfly Grove. "It's Berry Season!": It is Berry Day on Birdwell Island. Emily Elizabeth and Clifford get carried away collecting all of the berries. They set to correct their wrongdoing when they realize they did not preserve any berries for other Birdwell Island residents. Willa moment: Willa blows a blue feather. She plans to blow it over a volleyball goal and lands on a frog. Willa intends to reclaim it by climbing up the volleyball goal. She thankfully gains it back with assistance from the frog.
17	"Farm Friends" "The Big Book Giveaway"	Mike Weiss and Geri Bertolo	Marisa Lark Wallin Margaret Heidenry	Luke Gustafson Adamo Lupusella	May 15, 2020	317
"Farm Friends": Emily Elizabeth and friends imagine themselves as farmers. They develop their own farm in Emily Elizabeth's family yard. "The Big Book Giveaway": Emily Elizabeth and Clifford imagine themselves as fairies. They unwittingly accidentally donate his beloved book when they flit around Birdwell Island collecting books for Donation Day. He happily learns his lesson that their friends would enjoy reading it as well. Willa moment: Willa steps into the small botanical front yard, but one of her paws ends up being muddy. A seagull manages to have her clean her paw in a birdbath. Willa climbs into the birdbath and falls in it. She and the seagull take a bubble bath. Willa's paw is clean once again.
18	"Whale of a Time" "Clifford's Museum"	Mike Weiss and Geri Bertolo	Isabel Galupo Craig Shemin; Premise By: Jennifer Oxley	Al Jeffrey Paul Riley	May 15, 2020	318
"Whale of a Time": Clifford is determined to meet a Babette the white whale. She is allegedly larger than Clifford, but the problem is nobody from Birdwell Island has ever seen her. "Clifford's Museum": Clifford and Emily Elizabeth open a museum with interesting objects found within Birdwell Island's surroundings. As its citizens visit this museum, they learn that every item comes with a special story. Willa moment: Willa intends to ride on a skateboard down a hill and the seagull encourages her. She rapidly slides down on the skateboard with panic. It sinks to the bottom of a swimming pool. Willa and the seagull learn to get along with each other afterwards.
19	"The Adventures of Clifford the Good" "Surf's Up.... and Down"	Mike Weiss and Geri Bertolo	Craig Shemin	Luke Gustafson Adamo Lupusella	May 15, 2020	319
"The Adventures of Clifford the Good": Inspired by the British folktale of Robin Hood, Clifford sets out to tackle a series of "good deeds" around his community. When a big emergency strikes, he and his merry band of rescuers arrive to mend all problems of Birdwell Island. "Surf's Up.... and Down": Jack must learn the importance of never surrendering as he struggles to learn to how to surf the waves with friends. Willa moment: Willa has a great challenge of participating in an obstacle course on a playground with a frog and a seagull, but she has trouble jumping over a pond and a fence. The frog encourages Willa jumps on rocks to cross over the pond and the seagull manages to open the gate for Willa.
20	"The Wild Wolf Pack" "Putt-ing it Together"	Mike Weiss and Geri Bertolo	Steven James Meyer Melinda LaRose	Paul Riley Luke Gustafson	May 15, 2020	320
"The Wild Wolf Pack": Clifford and his canine friends form a wolf pack and romp around Birdwell Island, but they realize how much they miss their owners when it comes to howling at the nighttime sky. "Putt-ing it Together": Emily Elizabeth and Clifford intend to surprise their friends by building a miniature golf course. This assignment proves to be a lot until they learn to ask for assistance and work together. Willa moment: Willa and a mouse play tag in a house until they notice a piano. They start touching its black and white keys, but at separate times. They happily manage to play together as teamwork.
Part 4
21	"Dancing By the Book" "Tucker's Tooth"	Mike Weiss and Geri Bertolo	Ruth Morrison Cynthia Furey	Paul Riley Luke Gustafson	August 21, 2020	321
22	"The March of the Sea Turtles" "A Squirrely Situation"	Mike Weiss and Geri Bertolo	Shelley Hoffman & Robert Pincombe Melinda LaRose	Allan Jeffery Paul Riley	August 21, 2020	322
23	"An End By Every Friend" "Bailey's Starry Night!"	Mike Weiss and Geri Bertolo	Stacey Greenberger Michael Rodriguez	Luke Gustafson Michelle Ku	August 21, 2020	323
24	"The Spectacle Spectacular" "The New Babysitter"	Mike Weiss and Geri Bertolo	Melinda LaRose Marisa Lark Wallin	Al Jefferey Adamo Lupusella	August 21, 2020	324
25	"Searchers of the Lucky Coin" "Birdwell Backwards"	Mike Weiss and Geri Bertolo	Kevin Lappin Kevin Del Aguila	Luke Gustafson Michelle Ku	August 21, 2020	325
26	"Too Many Pets" "Clifford's On His Own"	Geri Bertolo	Anne-Marie Perrotta Stacey Greenberger	Al Jeffrey Paul Riley	August 21, 2020	326
Part 5
27	"The Birdwell Times" "Night at the Library"	Geri Bertolo	Stuart Friedel Craig Shemin	Luke Gustafson Michelle Ku	December 10, 2020	327
28	"Samantha's Perfect Day" "Welcome Home, Natalie Chan"	Geri Bertolo	Ashley Lannigan Craig Shemin	Al Jeffrey Adamo Lupusella	December 10, 2020	328
29	"All Grown Up" "Picture This"	Geri Bertolo	Isabel Galupo Craig Shemin	Luke Gustafson Michelle Ku	December 10, 2020	329
30	"Cool Clubhouse" "The Birdwell Islandeers"	Geri Bertolo	Shelley Hoffman & Robert Pincombe Kate Barris	Al Jeffrey Paul Riley	December 10, 2020	330
"Cool Clubhouse": Emily Elizabeth, Samantha, and Pablo want to make a clubhouse, but they get into a big argument and split up! However, while they make their own separate, but not very good clubhouses, they realize that they should work together. "The Birdwell Islandeers": The kids and Clifford are their own version of The Three Musketeers called The Birdwell Islandeers! However, the others have their own idea of what to do, so they decide to use all of their ideas, which causes a lot of problems! They discover that it takes a lot of bravery to do the right thing. Willa moment: Willa is taking a stroll, but she keeps getting hit on the head by acorns! Shelly realizes this and tries to help, but nothing works! But when Shelly gets on Willa's head, she protects Willa with her shell, saving Willa from the acorns!
31	"The Storm" "Officer Clifford"	Geri Bertolo	Anne-Marie Perrotta Craig Shemin	Luke Gustafson Michelle Ku	December 10, 2020	331
32	"The Dog Who Cried Bark!" "Fort Box"	Geri Bertolo	Shelley Hoffman & Robert Pincombe Craig Shemin	Al Jeffrey Paul Riley	December 10, 2020	332
33	"The Fortune Teller" "The Goat Boat"	Geri Bertolo	Kevin Del Aguila Steven James Meyer	Luke Gustafson Michelle Ku	December 10, 2020	333
Part 6
34	"Clifford's Valentine Collection" "Ready, Set, Vet!"	Geri Bertolo	Craig Shemin Stacey Greenberger	Al Jeffrey Paul Riley	February 12, 2021	338
35	"Walking in a Clifford Wonderland" "Bye Bye, Big Bluey"	Geri Bertolo	Kevin Del Aguila Jennifer Oxley	Luke Gustafson Michelle Ku	February 12, 2021	339
"Walking in a Clifford Wonderland": There's a big snowstorm on Birdwell Island, and Emily Elizabeth and Clifford want to help. But Clifford catches a cold from the freezing weather, so it's up to the citizens to help Clifford! "Bye Bye, Big Bluey": Clifford's special blue blanket is falling apart, so it's time for a new one! Emily Elizabeth decides to help Clifford by making him a new blanket to replace his old one. Willa moment: Willa goes to play with her friends, Froggy and Gull. While trying to cross the pond, Willa gets wet. When she tries to get over the fence, she can't do it! But luckily, Froggy and Gull are there for Willa.
36	"Doggy Air Rangers" "My Hero, Hero"	Geri Bertolo	Kevin Del Aguila Shelley Hoffman & Robert Pincombe	Al Jeffrey Paul Riley	February 12, 2021	334
37	"Try a Little YumYum!" "Come Back; Happy Jack!"	Geri Bertolo	Kevin Del Aguila; Premise by: Eric Black Marisa Lark Wallin	Luke Gustafson Paul Riley	February 12, 2021	336
"Try a Little YumYum!": It's Dog Food Delivery Day, but they ran out of Clifford's favorite dog food! They now have Doggy YumYums, but Clifford doesn't want to try it because he thinks that they'll taste bad. Will Clifford realize that it's okay to try new things? "Come Back, Happy Jack!": Jack's favorite shoes have worn out, and he's very sad. His friends try to cheer him up, but their efforts cause him to become increasingly upset to the point of breaking down. After being by himself for a little bit, Jack feels a lot more better. Willa moment: Willa is playing with a feather on the court, but Froggy also wants to play with it! Willa gets sad, but Froggy shares the feather, and both of them have tons of fun.
38	"When You Wish Upon a Cake" "Make Room for Sonia"	Geri Bertolo	Craig Shemin	Luke Gustafson Michelle Ku	February 12, 2021	337
"Make Room for Sonia": Pablo has a new baby sister: Sonia, the newest addition to the household. Unfortunately for him, Sonia ends up getting most if not all of the attention, leaving Pablo feeling neglected and ignored. Willa moment: Willa tells the story of how she lived in the pound and no one came for her for fear of her claws. But after days and days of being alone, she had finally gotten adopted.
39	"The Halloween Costume Crisis" "Clifford's Howl-o-ween"	Geri Bertolo	Kevin Del Aguila	Luke Gustafson Michelle Ku	February 12, 2021	335

== Reception ==
Clifford the Big Red Dog received generally positive reviews from critics with parents praising it for its songs, morals, and format, although reviews from fans of the original show were more negative, with reasons for criticism included the removal of previous characters, switch of format and the inclusion of LGBT parenting, among other reasons.

=== Accolades ===
Year	Award	Category	Nominee	Result	Ref.
2021	GLAAD Media Awards	Outstanding Children's Programming	Clifford The Big Red Dog	Nominated	

=== Controversy ===
Samantha's two mothers caused the series to be controversial among anti-LGBT crowds. In May 2023, the Governor of Oklahoma, Kevin Stitt, vetoed a measure to provide state funding to Oklahoma Educational Television Authority for three years, due to their broadcasting of Clifford (and of Work It Out Wombats!, which also features same-sex parents). Stitt claims that it is "overly sexualizing" kids.

== Broadcast ==
The first seven episodes of Clifford the Big Red Dog were released on Amazon Prime Video on December 6, 2019, while PBS Kids began airing the series the next day.
