= Clifford's Really Big Movie =

- Theatrical release poster
- Directed by: Robert Ramirez
- Screenplay by: Rhett Reese; Robert Ramirez
- Based on: Clifford the Big Red Dog by Deborah Forte; Clifford the Big Red Dog by Norman Bridwell
- Produced by: Deborah Forte
- Starring: John Ritter; Wayne Brady; Kel Mitchell; Cree Summer; Judge Reinhold; Jenna Elfman; Wilmer Valderrama; Jess Harnell; John Goodman; Kath Soucie; Grey DeLisle
- Edited by: Monte Bramer
- Music by: Jody Gray
- Production companies: Scholastic Entertainment; Big Red Dog Productions
- Distributed by: Warner Bros. Pictures
- Release dates: February 20, 2004 (limited); April 23, 2004 (official)
- Running time: 74 minutes
- Country: United States
- Language: English
- Budget: $70,000
- Box office: $3.3 million

Clifford's Really Big Movie is a 2004 American animated adventure comedy film based on the PBS Kids TV series Clifford the Big Red Dog, itself an adaptation of the book series of the same name by Norman Bridwell. This film was directed by Robert Ramirez, produced by Scholastic Entertainment and Big Red Dog Productions, and was originally released in theaters for a limited time by Warner Bros. Pictures on February 20, 2004.

The film takes place on "Birdwell Island" (the name of which is inspired by Norman Bridwell, the author of the books), and follows the titular dog Clifford, who decides to join a traveling animal show that will provide the winner with a lifetime supply of the dog food, after he mistakenly assumes his owners are spending too much on his dog food.

It is one of only two separate theatrically released films based on a PBS children's property (including Barney's Great Adventure), excluding the two films based on Sesame Street. This was John Ritter's final film role, as he died on September 11, 2003 after completing voice work for the film as Clifford. The film was dedicated to his memory and also serves as the series finale to the television series.

The film grossed $3.3 million at the box office and received mixed critical reviews.

== Plot ==
In Birdwell Island, Clifford visits a carnival with Emily Elizabeth Howard and her friends, Charley and Jetta. Clifford's friends, Cleo and T-Bone, also tag along. There, "Larry's Amazing Animals," an animal act, is performing. It consists of Shackelford the High Flying Ferret, Dorothy the High Wire Heifer aka Daring Cow, Dirk the Extreme Dachshund, and Rodrigo, Chihuahua of Steel. Despite the animals' best efforts, their show is failing. However, all of those animals remain oblivious of the truth as their owner and the show's host, Larry Gablegobble, expresses his pride towards their efforts. After the show, Larry tells the carnival owner, P.T., that the only way for their performances to continue is to win an upcoming Tummy Yummies Animal Talent Contest in three weeks, promising fame, fortune, and a lifetime supply of Tummy Yummies. When Clifford, Cleo and T-Bone go to collect their autographs, Shackleford attempts to convince them to join the act, believing that Clifford's size and appearance would help revive the group's popularity. The three friends are delighted, but, however, decline, unwilling to leave their owners.

The next day, Clifford overhears Mr. and Mrs. Howard talking with Mr. Bleakman. Clifford mistakenly believes that he is financially burdening his family with his expensive costs of food and decides to join the Amazing Animals in the hopes of winning food to cover his costs. T-Bone and Cleo decide to join him. Clifford promises Emily Elizabeth while she sleeps that he will return and will not be gone for long. After crossing a seaway and escaping a town afraid of Clifford, the trio finds Larry's animals. Since Larry cannot accept animals with owners, Cleo disposes their pet tags, claiming that they are to trick dogcatchers and put them in a crate for safe keeping. Larry welcomes the trio and during their next performance, Clifford saves the show, receiving a round of applause. Clifford soon makes the other animals improve their acts, such as helping Dorothy conquer her acrophobia. He becomes the star of the show. Jealous, Shackleford believes that Clifford has replaced him. Meanwhile, Emily Elizabeth, Mrs. Diller, and Sheriff Lewis discover that their dogs have run away.

After three weeks of success, Larry's Amazing Animals receive entry for the Tummy Yummies contest that will take place the following night. However, Shackleford reveals his jealousy towards Clifford, believing that they are all better off without him. Hurt by Shackleford's words and missing Emily Elizabeth, Clifford decides to leave early and return home to Birdwell Island. Cleo and T-Bone, however, convince Clifford to return, and save Larry and the others from their broken-down bus, making it to the contest. Larry's Amazing Animals win, but the Tummy Yummies corporation's CEO, George C. Wolfsbottom, tricks Larry into signing a contract giving him full custody of Clifford, and kidnaps him for his spoiled daughter Madison, who wanted the dog.

At the hotel, Shackleford tries to convince everyone that Clifford just wanted the Tummy Yummies. This prompts Cleo to expose Clifford's true intentions. Shackleford realizes that he was wrong about Clifford and shows the tags to Larry, who contacts Emily Elizabeth to inform her of Clifford's whereabouts. Larry drives the animals to Mr. Wolfsbottom's mansion. While Larry talks to a security guard, the animals infiltrate the mansion and Shackleford breaks Clifford out of a cage, apologizing for being jealous. T-Bone accidentally sets off the alarm, and Mr. Wolfsbottom's security guards try to capture the animals. Emily Elizabeth eventually arrives in time to claim Clifford before Mr. Wolfsbottom can get him. At first, Mr. Wolfsbottom refuses to let her keep Clifford, showing his contract, but Madison, having a change of heart, convinces her father to release Clifford upon learning about his real owner. Mr. Wolfsbottom allows Clifford to go to Birdwell Island and even provides him the lifetime supply of Tummy Yummies, solving the problem the Howards were dealing with earlier. The trio bid the Amazing Animals a farewell and Clifford reconciles with Shackleford. Clifford, Emily Elizabeth, Cleo and T-Bone then return to Birdwell Island.

== Voice cast ==
- John Ritter as Clifford, the enormous, 20-foot-tall red Labrador Retriever/Vizsla mixed-breed dog from the 2000 series. In the film, he joins a travelling animal show named "Larry's Amazing Animals" along with his friends, T-Bone and Cleo.
- Wayne Brady as Shackelford, a blue Ferret in the animal show.
- Grey DeLisle as Emily Elizabeth Howard, Clifford's owner from the 2000 series.
  - DeLisle also voices Mrs Howard, Emily Elizabeth's mother from the 2000 series.
- Jenna Elfman as Dorothy, a Cow in the animal show.
- John Goodman as George Wolfsbottom, the founder and CEO of the "Tummy Yummies" corporation, a dog food brand.
- Judge Reinhold as Larry Gablegobble, The Ringmaster and Namesake of "Larry's Amazing Animals".
- Jess Harnell as Dirk, a Dachshund in the animal show.
- Kel Mitchell as T-Bone, the yellow male Bulldog from the 2000 series. In the film, he joins the animal show, along with Clifford and Cleo.
- Nick Jameson as Sheriff Lewis, T-Bone's owner from the 2000 series.
- Kath Soucie as Madison Wolfsbottom, Mr. Wolfsbottom's daughter.
  - Soucie also voices Jetta Handover, one of Emily Elizabeth's friends from the 2000 series.
- Oren Williams as Charley, one of Emily Elizabeth's friends from the 2000 series.
- Cree Summer as Cleo, the purple female Poodle (who is one of Clifford's friends) from the 2000 series. In the film, she joins the animal show along with Clifford and T-Bone.
  - Summer also voices Mrs. Diller, Cleo's owner from the 2000 series.
- Wilmer Valderrama as Rodrigo, a chihuahua who is in the animal show.
- Cam Clarke as Mr Howard, Emily Elizabeth's father from the 2000 series.
- Earl Boen as Horace Bleakman, Emily Elizabeth's neighbor from the 2000 series. This film marked Boen's final theatrical film appearance prior to his death in 2023.
- Ernie Hudson as P.T., the carnival owner, and another friend of Larry.

== Production ==
The film marked John Ritter's last film role before his death on September 11, 2003, several months before its theatrical release, though he had fully completed his voice work for the project during the summer hiatus from his sitcom 8 Simple Rules. The film was dedicated in his memory.

Clifford's Really Big Movie was the last Warner Bros. Pictures film to use hand-drawn/traditional animation until 2018's Teen Titans Go! To the Movies.

=== Home media ===
The film was released on DVD and VHS on August 24, 2004, by Warner Home Video. In September 2015, it was re-released by Universal Pictures Home Entertainment. As of 2023, the film is available to stream on Amazon Prime Video.

== Soundtrack ==
Jody Gray composed the score for the film. However, the soundtrack album has never been released to this day.

=== Songs from soundtrack ===
- "Until I Go" – Kyle Gordon
- "Party Time" – Jody Gray
- "I'm Not Scared Anymore" – Renee Cologne
- "You and Me" – Jody Gray
- "Big Time" – Jody Gray
- "Larry's Amazing Animals" – Jody Gray
- "Until I Go" (Reprise) – Laura Berman
- "Home Where I Belong" – Romaine Jones

== Reception ==
=== Critical response ===
On the review aggregator website Rotten Tomatoes, 55% of 31 critics' reviews are positive, with an average rating of 5.7/10. The website's consensus reads: "While a dull affair for parents, Clifford's Really Big Movie should charm its intended preschool audience." Metacritic, which uses a weighted average, assigned the film a score of 49 out of 100, based on 15 critics, indicating "mixed or average" reviews.

Anna Smith of Empire gave the film a three out of five stars, stating: "The humour, though, is aimed squarely at the under-tens, so the rest of us will find it a bit bland. Bland, but wholesome - in a very inoffensive, family-friendly way." Peter Bradshaw of The Guardian gave the film a two out of five stars, saying: "Easygoing and amiable, it is none the less dull compared to the brilliant new players on the scene. The way to challenge them is with an extra-good script and storyline, and this one doesn't exactly stand out." Solan Freer of RadioTimes also gave the film a two out of five stars, saying: "With its unsophisticated plot and flat, simplistic animation, this is an undemanding film with no appeal beyond its target audience. Entirely unsuitable for the cinema, its best watched at home, where little ones will most appreciate its bouncy, sunny style and gaudy block colouring." Nell Minow of Common Sense Media gave the film a 3 out of 5 stars, stating "Charming and harmless. Nap while your kid enjoys."

=== Box office ===
During its opening weekend, the film made back $662,152 at the domestic box office in a limited release of 471 theaters. Ultimately, the film finished its run with $2,922,354 at the domestic box office and $333,072 internationally, for a combined total of $3,255,426.
