= Clifford the Big Red Dog (2000 TV series) =

American animated children's television series

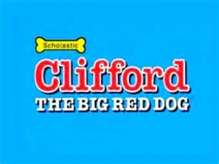
- Also known as: Clifford
- Genre: Educational; Comedy; Urban fantasy
- Based on: Clifford the Big Red Dog by: Norman Bridwell
- Developed by: Deborah Forte; Martha Atwater; Jef Kaminsky
- Directed by: John Over
- Voices of: John Ritter; Grey DeLisle; Cree Summer; Kel Mitchell; Cam Clarke; Kath Soucie; Gary LeRoi Gray; Terrence C. Carson; Ulysses Cuadra; Earl Boen; Edie McClurg; Nick Jameson; Susan Blu; Tony Plana; Haunani Minn
- Theme music composer: Josh Mancell; Mark Mothersbaugh
- Opening theme: "Clifford the Big Red Dog" performed by Jason Michael
- Ending theme: "Clifford the Big Red Dog" (instrumental)
- Composers: Josh Mancell; Mark Mothersbaugh
- Country of origin: United States
- Original language: English
- No. of seasons: 2
- No. of episodes: 66 (130 segments) (list of episodes)

Production
- Executive producer: Deborah Forte
- Producers: Martha Atwater; Jef Kaminsky (season 2)
- Running time: 26 minutes
- Production companies: Mike Young Productions; Scholastic Productions

Original release
- Network: PBS Kids
- Release: September 4, 2000 – February 25, 2003

Related
- Clifford's Puppy Days; Clifford's Really Big Movie; Clifford the Big Red Dog (2019)

Clifford the Big Red Dog is an American animated educational children's television series, based upon Norman Bridwell's children's book series of the same name. Produced by Scholastic Productions in association with Mike Young Productions, it was originally aired on PBS Kids from September 4, 2000, to February 25, 2003.

John Ritter voiced Clifford in every episode. By the time the series ended production and the subsequent film Clifford's Really Big Movie were completed, Ritter was back on ABC's prime time schedule, starring in 8 Simple Rules. Ritter's death on September 11, 2003, came ten days after the debut of Clifford's Puppy Days (it is often mistakenly cited as the reason the spin-off was created in lieu of a third season).

Though production of Clifford ended before Ritter's death, voice actors for the main characters have reprised some of their roles for the Ready to Learn PBS Kids PSAs. Clifford's Really Big Movie served as the series finale, while Clifford's Puppy Days still continued to air until its cancellation in 2006.

On May 16, 2018, Scholastic announced a reboot of the series, which was announced on December 5, 2019, to be released on December 6, 2019, on Amazon Prime Video and December 7, 2019, on PBS Kids, starring Adam Sanders as the new voice of Clifford. PBS Kids continued to air reruns of the 2000 series until October 2, 2022. Very few PBS member stations still continue to carry the series.

As of 2021, the show is currently distributed worldwide by 9 Story Media Group.

== Premise ==
Two stories made up each half-hour episode. Usually, one story featured Clifford and his canine friends, Cleo, T-Bone, and Mac among them; the other story would focus on Clifford's owner, Emily Elizabeth and her friends, Jetta, Vaz, and Charley. During scenes focusing on the dogs' perspective, human speech would take place of barking to show the storyline from the dogs' point of view.

== Characters ==
=== Humans ===
- Emily Elizabeth Howard (voiced by Grey DeLisle), is Clifford's 8-year-old owner. Emily Elizabeth adopted Clifford when he was a very small puppy, when her parents gave him to her on her sixth birthday. Emily Elizabeth's admiration evidently caused Clifford to grow enormous, thus starting their new lives on Birdwell Island. Emily Elizabeth was named for creator Norman Bridwell's daughter and based on the imaginary adventures of Bridwell's wife.
- Caroline Howard (also voiced by Grey DeLisle) is Emily Elizabeth's mother and the wife of Mark Howard. She owns and works at the Sea Shell, which is a small store on Birdwell Island.
- Mark Howard (voiced by Cam Clarke) is Emily Elizabeth's father and the husband of Caroline Howard.
- Charley (voiced by Gary LeRoi Gray) is a Jamaican-American kid who is Emily Elizabeth's friend. He lives on a houseboat with his father, who owns a seafood restaurant.
- Samuel (voiced by Terrence C. Carson) is Charley's father and the Jamaican owner of Samuel's Fish and Chips. He runs most of the pier.
- Jetta Handover (voiced by Kath Soucie) is Mac's owner. She is an Italian-American girl and a friend of Emily Elizabeth. She tends to be very snobby towards others, especially Clifford. She often wears her sweater as a poncho. She is Cosmo's big sister. Soucie also voiced Jetta's mother who owns one of the island stores.
- Cosmo Handover (voiced by Debi Derryberry) is the infant brother of Jetta. He is first seen in the episode "Baby Makes 4".
- Vaz (voiced by Ulysses Cuadra) is a Latin American boy who is friends with Emily Elizabeth and Charley.
- Sheriff Lewis (voiced by Nick Jameson) is T-Bone's owner. The island's sheriff and the soccer coach.
- Mrs. Diller (voiced by Cree Summer) is Cleo's owner.
- Horace Bleakman (voiced by Earl Boen) is Violet's husband. Generally referred to as "Mr. Bleakman", he often has a very strong on-and-off dislike towards Clifford and other dogs, but sometimes shows some sympathy for his neighbors and their pets.
- Violet Bleakman (voiced by Edie McClurg) is the first neighbor of the Howards to introduce herself and Horace's wife, generally known as Mrs. Bleakman.
- Mary (also voiced by Kath Soucie) is Emily Elizabeth's friend who sits in a wheelchair due to her disability of walking and standing up. She plays piano.
- Dan (voiced by Susan Blu) is one of Emily Elizabeth's classmates.
- Laura Howard (voiced by E. G. Daily) is Emily Elizabeth's cousin who owns a dog named Rex.
- Miss Debbie Carrington (voiced by Grey Griffin) is the Black American schoolteacher on Birdwell Island.
- Monique (voiced by Simbi Khali) is Jetta's Black American friend.
- Victor and Pedro (both voiced by Tony Plana) work at the ferry dock.
- Ms. Naomi Lee (voiced by Haunani Minn) is the Asian-American librarian at the Birdwell Island Library.
- Dr. Dinh (also voiced by Haunani Minn) is the island's Asian-American vet. She later adopts a dog named Bob.

=== Animals ===
- Gordo (voiced by Frank Welker) is an Indian elephant that catches a cold, but performs well with Clifford in one episode.
- Boomer (also voiced by Frank Welker) is a brown capuchin monkey who performs in the circus with Gordo.

==== Dogs ====
- Clifford (voiced by John Ritter) is a giant red Labrador Retriever Vizsla mix. The depiction of Clifford's enormous size is inconsistent; he is often shown as being about 25 feet (7.6 m) tall from paws to head, but can appear far larger. The character is based on the imaginary friend of creator Norman Bridwell's wife. His owner is Emily Elizabeth Howard. Although his tremendous height sometimes tends to get him in trouble with others, Clifford never means any harm and is very friendly to everyone.
- Cleo (voiced by Cree Summer) is a hyperactive purple female poodle. Her owner is Mrs. Diller, but she mainly spends the day with her friends Clifford and T-Bone. Her catchphrase is "Have I ever steered you wrong?"; when the dogs would reminisce on a time that happened, she interrupts them in mid-sentence. She strongly disliked baths until "No Baths for Cleo".
- T-Bone (voiced by Kel Mitchell) is a timid yellow male bulldog. His owner is Sheriff Lewis, but he mainly spends the day with his friends Clifford and Cleo. He is very sensitive to loud noises.
  - T-Bone once had a friend named Hamburger (voiced by Mitchell's longtime Nickelodeon fellow and best friend Kenan Thompson) who moved away before Clifford arrived.
- Mac (also voiced by Cam Clarke) is a blue male greyhound. It is revealed in a few episodes that his name is short for Machiavelli. His owner is Jetta Handover; much like his owner, Mac tends to be very snobby towards his friends.
- K.C. (also voiced by Cam Clarke) is a male beagle who only walks on three legs. He is one of Clifford's, Cleo's and T-Bone's best friends. He later becomes an Assistance Dog for Mrs.Young, Bruno Young's elderly mother.
- Mimi (voiced by Tyisha Hampton) is a female brown poodle and T-Bone's love interest who occasionally visits Birdwell Island.
- Rex (voiced by Frank Welker) is Clifford's friend from the time when he was still a puppy.
- Manny (also voiced by Frank Welker) is an elderly schnauzer who appears in some episodes from time to time.
- Kiki (voiced by Gabrielle Carteris) is Cleo's playful and energetic niece.
- Bob (voiced by Debi Derryberry) is Dr. Dinh's rambunctious dachshund.
- Tonya (voiced by Maria Canals-Barrera) is a beautiful orange and white female collie and Mac's girlfriend.
- Frankie (voiced by Frankie Muniz) is a Chihuahua.

==== Cats ====
- Betty (voiced by Debi Derryberry) is a playful yellow cat and sister of Billy.
- Billy (voiced by Susan Blu) is a playful orange cat and brother of Betty.

== Episodes ==
Season	Segments	Episodes	Originally released	
Season	Segments	Episodes	First released	Last released
1	80	40	September 4, 2000	December 5, 2001
2	50	26	February 12, 2002	February 25, 2003

== Production ==
The series was produced by Mike Young Productions and Scholastic Entertainment, with animation produced by Hong Ying Universe Company Limited in Taipei, Taiwan and Hosem Animation Studio, a Shanghai-based outlet in China who did the uncredited work.

=== Setting ===
The TV series takes place in the fictional island of Birdwell Island, where Clifford lives. The name is inspired by Norman Bridwell, the author of the books (who otherwise was not involved in the production of the series) but the letters I and R are swapped. Birdwell Island was inspired by Martha's Vineyard in Massachusetts, where Bridwell lived.

Emily Elizabeth used to live in an apartment in New York City, but she moved away with her parents and Clifford to Birdwell Island because her mother told her that a small apartment is no place for a big dog like Clifford.

=== Format ===
The series has at least four segments in the show.

1. First story: The opening theme is followed by the first central story, which is usually about the dogs, and a problem they face.
2. Storytime with Speckle: (See the main Speckle section below)
3. Second story: Another central story, usually about Emily Elizabeth and her friends.
4. Clifford's Big Ideas: Another 30-second short, which demonstrates a moral lesson such as "Play Fair" or "Help Others", with narration by Emily Elizabeth.
5. Live action segments starring real kids and their dogs (Optional).

In the UK version, only one story is shown, with either the Storytime with Speckle or the Clifford's Big Ideas segments at the end, shortening the show to about 15 minutes.

Discovery Kids LA airings omit the Storytime with Speckle segments, going straight to the second story, and the Clifford's Big Ideas segments and even the optional segment, going straight to the closing credits. This results in those airings lasting 22 minutes to comply with Discovery Kids LA's rule of 22 minutes per airing.

==== Storytime with Speckle ====
Storytime with Speckle is a segment that comes between the first and second story. The segment has 20 episodes for season 1, as well as 25 episodes for season 2. In the segment, Emily Elizabeth reads Clifford a short story about an anthropomorphic dog named Speckle and his animal friends.

Storytime with Speckle cast:

- Speckle – The main character, Speckle, is a yellow and brown spotted puppy dog.
- Luna – Luna is an orange and brown raccoon.
- Ravi – Ravi is a blue and white panda cub.
- Reba – Reba is a gray bunny rabbit.
- Darnell – Darnell is a yellow and white duck.

== Reception ==
Lynne Heffley of Los Angeles Times wrote, "Clifford: The Big Red Dog focuses on positive messages with a fantasy approach. Based on the classic children's books by Norman Bridwell, this animated series is about a red dog who is the size of a jumbo jet to match the outsized love that his owner, a little girl named Emily, has for him."

== Broadcast and home media ==
Clifford the Big Red Dog originally aired on PBS Kids from September 4, 2000, to February 25, 2003. Until October 2, 2022, PBS Kids continued to air reruns of the 2000 series on some PBS stations. Very few PBS member stations still continue to carry the series. A 15-minute British version (dubbed with British voice actors replacing the original American soundtrack) first aired on BBC Two in April 2002, with reruns on CBeebies and later Tiny Pop in 2012. Internationally, Germany-based TV-Loonland AG handled broadcast rights to the series, while Entertainment Rights held merchandising and home media rights. The series was also shown in Latin America on Discovery Kids. In Ireland, it aired on the Gaelic-language TG4 from 6 February 2001. It aired in Australia on Network Ten and in New Zealand on TV2. In Benelux, Nickelodeon also aired the series during mid-2000s. During 2000s to 2010s, Lionsgate (formerly Artisan/FHE) released the series on home media. In Canada, Alliance Atlantis also released the series. The series is available to stream on Tubi and The Roku Channel.

== 2019 reboot ==
On May 16, 2018, Scholastic announced a reboot of the series, which premiered on December 6, 2019, for both Amazon Prime Video and PBS Kids. Scholastic, 100 Chickens, 9 Story Media Group and Brown Bag Films produced the series. Excepting Clifford, Emily Elizabeth and Birdwell Island, the new series is a complete departure from the predecessor series' character base.

== In other media ==
=== Direct-to-video ===
In 1988, before the television series, six direct-to-video episodes based on the Clifford series (Clifford's Fun with Letters, Clifford's Fun with Sounds, Clifford's Fun with Rhymes, Clifford's Fun with Opposites, Clifford's Fun with Numbers and Clifford's Fun with Shapes) were produced by Nelvana Limited (Canadian) and Scholastic Media, but released on videocassette by Family Home Entertainment. Brent Titcomb voiced Clifford and Alyson Court voiced Emily Elizabeth.

=== Film ===
In 2004, Warner Bros. Pictures distributed a feature-length animated film based on the show, Clifford's Really Big Movie. In the film, Clifford, Cleo and T-Bone join an animal show to win a lifetime supply of dog food to provide for Clifford. This was one of John Ritter's last films as he died on September 11, 2003, after completing voice work for the film. Clifford's Really Big Movie was released posthumously and dedicated to his memory. The movie also stars Wayne Brady as Shackleford the Ferret, Judge Reinhold as Amazing Larry, John Goodman as George Wolfsbottom, and Jenna Elfman as Dorothy the Cow. Due to Ritter's death, the film also serves as the series finale, as no new episodes were produced after the film was released, until the reboot premiered on PBS Kids in 2019.

=== Video games ===
==== Original series ====
- Clifford's Reading
- Clifford's Thinking Adventures

==== Modern series ====
- Clifford's Learning Activities
- Clifford's Musical Memory Games
- Clifford's Phonics
- Clifford's Big Puzzle Game (a Wendy's kids' meal DVD game, available for a limited time only)

==== Sponsors ====
- Kix (2000–2003)
- Chuck E. Cheese (2001–2012)
- Danimals (2002–2006)
- Milton Bradley (2002)
- Lipton (2003–2005)
- Buffets, Inc. (2013-2022)
