= Clifford the Big Red Dog (film) =

2021 film by Walt Becker

- Official and Theatrical release poster
- Directed by: Walt Becker
- Screenplay by: Jay Scherick; David Ronn; Blaise Hemingway
- Story by: Justin Malen; Ellen Rapoport
- Based on: Clifford the Big Red Dog by Norman Bridwell
- Produced by: Jordan Kerner; Iole Lucchese
- Starring: Jack Whitehall; Darby Camp; Tony Hale; Sienna Guillory; David Alan Grier; Russell Wong; Kenan Thompson; John Cleese
- Cinematography: Peter Lyons Collister
- Edited by: Sabrina Plisco
- Music by: John Debney
- Production companies: New Republic Pictures; The K Entertainment Company; Scholastic Entertainment
- Distributed by: Paramount Pictures (Worldwide); Entertainment One (Canada and United Kingdom)
- Release dates: August 26, 2021 (CinemaCon); November 10, 2021 (United States)
- Running time: 96 minutes
- Countries: Canada; United Kingdom; United States
- Language: English
- Budget: $64 million
- Box office: $117.8 million

Clifford the Big Red Dog is a 2021 live-action animated urban fantasy comedy film directed by Walt Becker from a screenplay by Blaise Hemingway and the writing team of Jay Scherick and David Ronn, and a story by Justin Malen and Ellen Rapoport, based on the children's book series by Norman Bridwell. The film stars Jack Whitehall, Darby Camp, Tony Hale, Sienna Guillory, David Alan Grier, Russell Wong, Kenan Thompson and John Cleese.

The film was screened unannounced on August 26, 2021, during the 2021 CinemaCon event in Los Angeles. It was initially scheduled to premiere at the 2021 Toronto International Film Festival in September 2021, to be followed by a theatrical release in the United States on September 17 after being delayed due to the COVID-19 pandemic by Paramount Pictures, but was ultimately pulled from the festival and had its release date removed from Paramount's schedule due to the spread of the SARS-CoV-2 Delta variant. Ultimately, the film was simultaneously released theatrically and digitally on Paramount+ on November 10, 2021, in the United States. It received mixed reviews from critics and grossed $116 million worldwide.

== Plot ==
In New York City, 12-year-old Emily Elizabeth Howard lives with her mother Maggie and has only one friend, schoolmate Owen Yu. Maggie leaves Emily in the care of her uncle Casey before going to Chicago for a business trip.

Mr. Bridwell, who runs an animal rescue tent at a park, introduces Emily to a small red puppy whose family had been taken by dogcatchers. He says that the puppy will grow based on how much love he receives. Casey rejects the adoption due to dogs not being allowed in the apartment building. When Emily gets home from school, she finds the puppy in her backpack and names him Clifford. Casey allows her to keep Clifford only for one night.

The next morning, Clifford has grown to giant proportions. Clifford eventually chases and plays with a man in an inflatable bubble in a park. Word of his existence spreads online. After learning from a vet's secretary of Bridwell's past miracles with animals and their owners, the Howards plan to get information on his whereabouts. Clifford eventually escapes from Casey's truck and humiliates Emily's bully Florence by licking her, which soaks her, giving Emily the friends she always wanted.

Zac Tieran, the owner of biotechnology company Lyfegro, learns of Clifford from his assistant Colette. Wanting to discover the secret of the dog's stature, Tieran contacts the police, falsely claiming to have genetically engineered Clifford, and leads a citywide manhunt for him. Emily and Casey are evicted from their apartment by superintendent Mr. Packard, who Tieran also tipped off, and pursued by the cops and Lyfegro after Emily refuses his bribe. Owen and Emily escape with Clifford in Casey's van, while their neighbors fend off Tieran's bodyguards. The three shelter in Owen's lavish pied-à-terre apartment, where Casey says that Clifford can stay with Emily provided that they find Bridwell and have him shrink the dog down to his original size. If Bridwell cannot be found, Clifford must be sent away to Shanghai, where Owen's father, Mr. Yu, owns an animal sanctuary. They race to the hospital, only to find a patient who says that Bridwell has died. Out of options, the two contact Mr. Yu, who arranges for a tugboat to take Clifford to a freighter to China. After Emily bids her companion a tearful goodbye, the tugboat sails away under the cover of night.

Law enforcement however intercepts the freighter due to Tieran's claim that Clifford was stolen; Clifford is airlifted via helicopter to Lyfegro. Casey soon learns that the person who died at the hospital was a different man, meaning Bridwell is still alive, so he and Emily try to save Clifford from being experimented on at Lyfegro, once again aided by friends from their neighborhood. They break into Lyfegro's headquarters and rescue Clifford, who flees through the city with Emily riding on him.

At Manhattan Bridge Park, Emily reunites with Bridwell. He says that he cannot make Clifford small again as it was her love that made him big. Bridwell advises Emily to advocate for Clifford and herself, and that being different is a gift. Emily explains to everyone the importance of love, regardless of differences. Tieran then arrives and says that Clifford's owner can be determined by scanning an ID chip his scientists secretly implanted earlier. Bridwell makes the chip identify Emily as Clifford's rightful owner, leaving Tieran to be fined for lying to the police and wasting police resources. Emily and Casey reunite with Maggie. As Owen prepares to take a group photo of Clifford, Emily, Casey, Maggie, and the neighbors, Clifford spots two people in inflatable bubbles in the park and chases after them while Casey rides in horror atop Clifford's back.

Packard later reverses Emily and Maggie's eviction by making Clifford his new assistant in the apartment building. Casey leaves his van and goes to work for Scholastic Corporation. He, Emily, and Packard paint a mural of Clifford, which resembles his hand-drawn counterpart, implying that Casey's new job is authoring and illustrating fictional books about Clifford. New York City residents band together to build Clifford a giant doghouse between the Jarvis & Jarvis law firm and Alonso's bodega.

== Cast ==
- Darby Camp as Emily Elizabeth Howard, a 12-year-old girl who has to save Clifford from Lyfegro
- Jack Whitehall as Casey Porter, Emily's American maternal uncle and Maggie's younger brother
- Tony Hale as Zac Tieran, the owner of Lyfegro, a genetics company that wants Clifford
- Sienna Guillory as Maggie Howard, Emily's English mother and Casey's older sister
- David Alan Grier as Mr. Packard, the building superintendent of the apartment building that Emily and Maggie live in
- Russell Wong as Mr. Yu, Owen's father
- Kenan Thompson as Clifford's veterinarian
- Rosie Perez as Lucille, the veterinary clinic receptionist
- John Cleese as Mr. Bridwell, the magical animal rescuer who gives Clifford to Emily
- Izaac Wang as Owen Yu, the boy from another apartment and Emily's best friend and classmate
- Paul Rodriguez as Alonso, the bodega owner and Raul's boss
- Russell Peters as Malik
- Bear Allen-Blaine as Mrs. Jarvis, Emily's lawyer

== Production ==
In May 2012, it was reported that Universal Pictures and Illumination Entertainment would produce a live-action/animated film based on the book. Matt Lopez was hired to write the script while Chris Meledandri and Deborah Forte (creator and executive producer of the television series) were to produce, but in July 2013, it was reported that Illumination cancelled the project. On September 13, 2013, it was reported that the film was still in development at Universal Pictures with David Bowers in talks to direct the film. Like the 2011 film Hop, the titular dog character will be animated while the other characters will be live-action.

In 2016, Paramount Pictures had purchased the rights to develop a live-action and animated hybrid film. On September 25, 2017, it was reported that Walt Becker had been hired to direct from a script being re-written by Ellen Rapoport, and from the original written by Justin Malen, which would be produced by Forte through her Silvertongue Films banner. On June 20, 2019, Paramount closed a deal with Entertainment One to co-finance the film. Under the deal, Entertainment One Films would distribute the film in Canada and the United Kingdom excluding TV broadcast rights for the latter country, while Paramount would distribute in all other territories including the United States. On December 25, 2019, a photo from the film was leaked, revealing the computer-generated form of Clifford in the live-action scenery. In May 2019, Camp and Whitehall signed on to star in the film. In June 2019, Cleese, Guillory, Wang, Grier, Rosie Perez, Keith Ewell, Bear Allen-Blaine and Lynn Cohen joined the cast. Principal photography began on June 10, 2019, in New York City and wrapped on August 23, 2019, after 55 days of shooting. The visual effects were made by Moving Picture Company. On November 18, 2020, it was announced that John Debney would compose the film's score. The song "Room for You" performed by Madison Beer, was released on November 5, 2021.

== Release ==
Clifford the Big Red Dog was simultaneously released in theaters in Dolby Cinema and streaming on Paramount+ on November 10, 2021, in the United States. It was initially scheduled to have its world premiere at the 2021 Toronto International Film Festival in September, followed by a theatrical release on September 17 by Paramount Pictures, but the festival premiere was cancelled and the studio removed the film from its release schedule due to the rise of the Delta variant of COVID-19. It was originally scheduled to be released November 13, 2020, before being delayed to November 5, 2021 due to the COVID-19 pandemic. Prior to that, Universal Pictures initially slated the then-unproduced film for April 8, 2016, and then pushed back to December 31, 2016. The film had a surprise unannounced screening on August 26, 2021, during the 2021 CinemaCon event in Los Angeles. The film was then released in the UK on December 10, 2021, by Entertainment One. The film was also dedicated to Richard Robinson, the former CEO of Scholastic Corporation, who died on June 5, 2021.

=== Home media ===
Clifford the Big Red Dog was released on digital download by Paramount Home Entertainment on December 14, 2021, which features deleted scenes and special features including a behind-the-scenes look with interviews from the cast, and how Clifford's adventures began from the book series to the big screen. It was also released on February 1, 2022, on Blu-ray and DVD.

== Reception ==
=== Box office ===
Clifford the Big Red Dog grossed $48.9 million in the United States and Canada and $68.9 million in other territories, for a worldwide total of $117.8 million against a $64 million budget. In the United States and Canada, Clifford the Big Red Dog was projected to gross $15–17 million from 3,695 theaters over its first five days. The film made $2.3 million on its first day and $3.3 million on its second. It went on to debut to $16.4 million (and a total of $22 million over the five days), finishing second behind holdover Eternals. In its second weekend the film fell 51% to $8.1 million, finishing third. The film made $725,000 on Thanksgiving and then $5 million in its third weekend, placing sixth. The film went on to make $1.9 million in its fourth weekend, $1.3 million in its fifth, and $404,068 in its sixth.

=== Critical response ===
On Rotten Tomatoes, the film holds an approval rating of 58% based on 95 reviews with an average rating of 5.4/10. The website's critics consensus reads: "It may get younger viewers to sit and stay, but Clifford the Big Red Dog is nowhere near as charming as its classic source material." On Metacritic the film has a weighted average score of 55 out of 100, based on 21 critics, indicating "mixed or average" reviews. Audiences polled by CinemaScore gave the film an average grade of "A" on an A+ to F scale, while those at PostTrak gave it 4.5 out of 5 stars.

Owen Gleiberman of Variety wrote: "Clifford the Big Red Dog becomes a rowdy chase film-- as agreeable as Clifford himself, as simultaneously cute and in-your-face and as genially random in its ability to create chaos." Angie Han of The Hollywood Reporter wrote: "It's not reinventing the wheel or breaking new ground; [and] it's unlikely to wow audiences with its bold artistic vision or profound emotional depths. But there's a place for sturdy and familiar entertainment that delivers exactly what it intends, and Clifford the Big Red Dog is just that."

== Graphic novel adaptation ==
Comic writer Georgia Ball and illustrator Chi Ngo adapted the film into a graphic novel entitled Clifford the Big Red Dog: The Movie Graphic Novel. The graphic novel adaptation was originally scheduled to be published on August 23, 2021, but was pushed back to December 7, 2021 (one month after the film's release).

== Sequel ==
In November 2021, it was reported that Paramount Pictures is developing a sequel to the film.
