= Deborah Forte =

American film producer

Deborah Forte is an American producer of family television series and movies, websites and digital media including Clifford the Big Red Dog, Clifford's Puppy Days, Maya & Miguel, WordGirl, The Magic School Bus, the Goosebumps franchise's televised and film adaptations, Horrible Histories, Dragon, I Spy, The Baby-Sitters Club, The Golden Compass and Astroblast!. She created Scholastic Media, a division of Scholastic Inc. She is the founder of Silvertongue Films and under that banner is currently producing a television adaptation of His Dark Materials. She is attached to produce The 39 Clues and Spirit Animals for Universal and Clifford the Big Red Dog for Paramount. Her productions have won six Emmys, one Academy Award, the Humanitas Prize, and the Annenberg Public Policy Center Award for Outstanding Educational Program on a Commercial Broadcast Station.

== Career ==
Forte began her career in publishing at Viking Press in 1976 before joining Scholastic Productions in 1984 as VP of new business development.

Forte became President of Scholastic Media in 1995 and is the lead creative and business executive overseeing all media production including two production studios (Weston Woods and Soup2Nuts), Scholastic Interactive, Scholastic Audio Books and Scholastic Media Marketing and Consumer Products. Forte formed Scholastic Entertainment, a part of Scholastic Media, in 1997.

At Scholastic, Forte has produced over 300 productions, which includes adapting best-selling Scholastic book series Clifford the Big Red Dog, Dear America, I Spy, The Magic School Bus, Goosebumps, Animorphs and The Baby-Sitters Club into long-running children's TV series.

Her feature film credits include the Goosebumps film (2015; Columbia Pictures), The Indian in the Cupboard, Clifford's Really Big Movie, The Baby-Sitters Club, The Mighty and Tuck Everlasting. Forte produced The Golden Compass, an adaptation of Philip Pullman's critically acclaimed trilogy His Dark Materials, which won the 2008 Academy Award for Visual Effects.

She produced the 2018 film Mortal Engines, with Peter Jackson and Fran Walsh for Universal Pictures and will likely produce its TV re-adaptation. She also produced the TV adaptation of His Dark Materials.

== Filmography ==
=== Television ===
Year	Title	Role	Notes
1990	The Baby-Sitters Club	executive producer	
1994–1997	The Magic School Bus	executive producer	
1995–1998	Goosebumps	executive producer	
1998–2000	Animorphs	executive producer	
2000–2003	Clifford the Big Red Dog	executive producer	
2000–2001	Horrible Histories	executive producer	
2002–2003	I Spy	executive producer	
2003–2006	Clifford's Puppy Days	executive producer	
2004–2007	Maya & Miguel	executive producer	
2008–2011	Turbo Dogs	executive producer	
2009–2015	WordGirl	executive producer	
2014–2015	Astroblast!	executive producer	
2017–2021	The Magic School Bus Rides Again	executive producer	
2019–2022	His Dark Materials	executive producer	
2020–2021	The Baby-Sitters Club	executive producer	

=== Film ===
Year	Title	Role	Notes
1995	The Indian in the Cupboard	executive producer	
1995	The Baby-Sitters Club	executive producer	
2002	Tuck Everlasting	executive producer	
2002	Stellaluna	executive producer	
2004	Clifford's Really Big Movie	producer	
2007	The Golden Compass	producer	
2015	Goosebumps	producer	
2018	Goosebumps 2: Haunted Halloween	producer	
2018	Mortal Engines	producer	
2021	Clifford the Big Red Dog	executive producer	

== Awards and honors for production ==
- 1 Oscar Award
- 6 Emmy Awards
- 1 Humanitas Prize
- 11 Cine Golden Eagle Awards
- 12 Parents' Choice Awards
- 4 Webby Awards
- 1 National Education Association Award
- 1 American Women in TV and Radio's Gracie Award
- 1 National Educational Media Network Golden Apple Award
- 1 The Annenberg Public Policy Center Award
- 1 Literacy in Media Award
- honored by The National Hispanic Federation
- honored by The National Wildlife Federation
- honored by The Environmental Protection Agency

Forte's productions have won over 100 industry awards, including those listed above.

In The New York Times article, "At Scholastic, Turning Books Into the Stuff Of Multimedia", a colleague at Scholastic described her creative direction, by saying, "She takes tremendous care in seeing that our products get developed with the qualities that made them popular in the first place and making sure the new products are right for kids, educationally, developmentally and from an entertainment point of view." In Fast Company's Spring 2014 interview, "How Scholastic Kept Its Relevance in a Digital World", Forte shared that, “We have developed our brand so that it's relative and meaningful to children when they want to read, when they want to watch and when they want to play." Fast Company remarked that the Bottom Line from her interview was, "Scholastic's secret sauce is the development of a complementary media strategy across a variety of mediums, without losing focus on the company's mission. "

== Personal life ==
Forte was a founding member of the Board of Trustees of the Children's Museum of Manhattan and currently serves on the board of the American Center for Children and Media and the International Emmys. She is a member of the National Academy of Television Arts and Sciences as well as the British Academy of Film and Television Arts.

A native of Newton, Massachusetts, Forte graduated from Hamilton College. She lives in New York with her husband, Peter Stone, and their two sons.

== General references ==
- "About Scholastic". Scholastic.com. Archived from the original on 2013-07-06.
- "Media Room". Scholastic.com.
- Murray, Rebecca. "Producer Deborah Forte Talks About 'The Golden Compass'". about.com. Archived from the original on 2014-04-28.
