= Clifford the Big Red Dog =

American children's book series

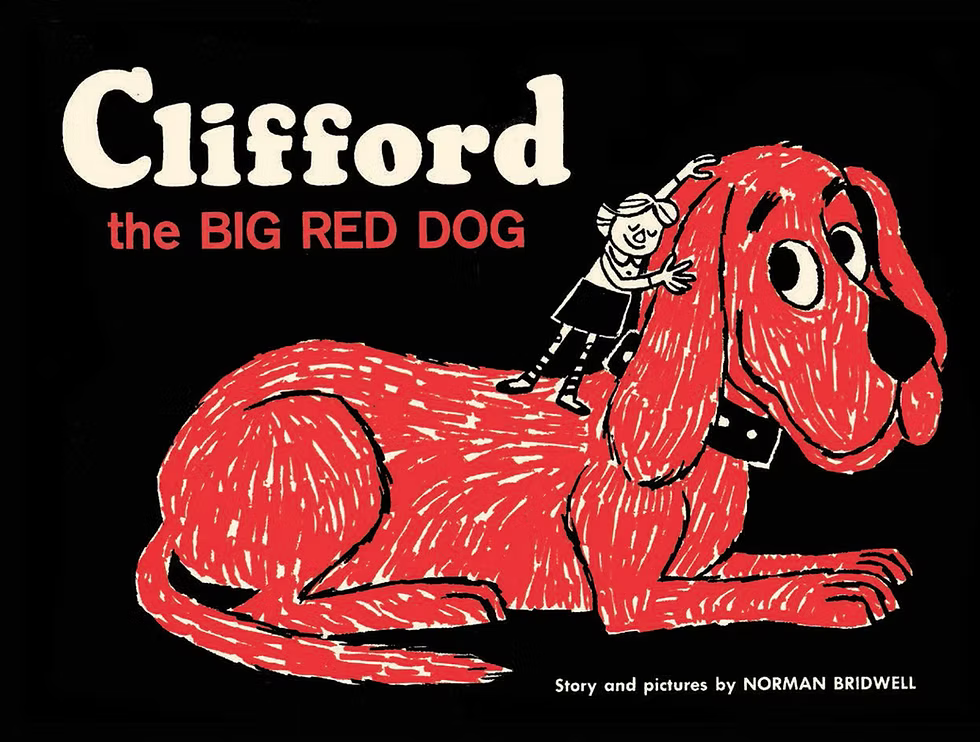
- Cover of Clifford the Big Red Dog (1963)
- Author: Norman Bridwell
- Country: United States
- Language: English
- Genre: Children
- Publisher: Scholastic
- Published: 1963–2015

Clifford the Big Red Dog is an American children's book series and media franchise focusing on the adventures of 8-year-old Emily Elizabeth and her titular, gigantic, love-filled, red-furred pet dog. It was first published in 1963 and was written by Norman Bridwell. There are 91 books in the series, with the final two released posthumously after Bridwell's death in 2014. The premise has been adapted into animation, video games, stage productions, and live-action, with the 2021 film being the most recent as of 2026. Clifford is the official mascot of Scholastic Corporation.

== Concept and creation ==
The character was inspired by author Norman Bridwell's childhood desire to own a dog the size of a horse. In 1962, Bridwell included paintings of what would become Clifford the Big Red Dog (named 'Tiny' at the time) in a portfolio of children's literature illustrations. In the process of showcasing his portfolio for publishing houses, Susan Hirschman at Harper & Row suggested Bridwell turned his drawings into a children's story. Bridwell then developed a story around the dog and his owner, which he would eventually submit to Scholastic. His wife suggested the name "Clifford" after her imaginary friend from her childhood, and Emily Elizabeth was named after Bridwell's daughter. The first book in the series was originally published by Scholastic in 1963.

== Characters ==
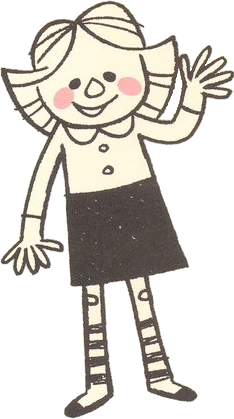
Emily Elizabeth as depicted in the original book in 1963.

- Clifford is a male red dog whose appearance, disposition and behavior are based on that of a giant dog. The depiction of Clifford's size is inconsistent. (Note: While he is often shown being about 25 feet (7.5 m) tall from paws to head, Clifford can appear far larger.) The character's name is based on the imaginary childhood friend of Norman Bridwell's wife, Norma Bridwell. Bridwell originally wanted to name the dog "Tiny", but his wife persuaded him that "Clifford" was better. Clifford's pet owner is Emily Elizabeth. Clifford has a mother, two brothers, and two sisters, all of whom are normal-sized dogs. Clifford was originally the runt of the litter, seemingly fated to be small and sick, but grew to an enormous size apparently due to Emily Elizabeth's love and care. Clifford's character was created when a Harper & Row editor advised Bridwell to write a story to go along with one of his pictures. Bridwell recalls she picked out his sketch of a baby girl with a horse-sized bloodhound, and casually said, "There might be a story in this" because there always was one.
- Emily Elizabeth is an 8-year-old (Note: 12-year-old in the 2021 film as well as its sequel.) girl with blond hair. She is Clifford's owner and human friend, frequently portrayed riding him like a horse. She was named after Bridwell's daughter and based on the imaginary adventures of Bridwell's wife. The TV series adaptation gives her a surname, Emily Elizabeth Howard, and changes the background, with her receiving Clifford as a surprise present on her 6th birthday instead of picking him out as a Christmas present.

== List of books ==
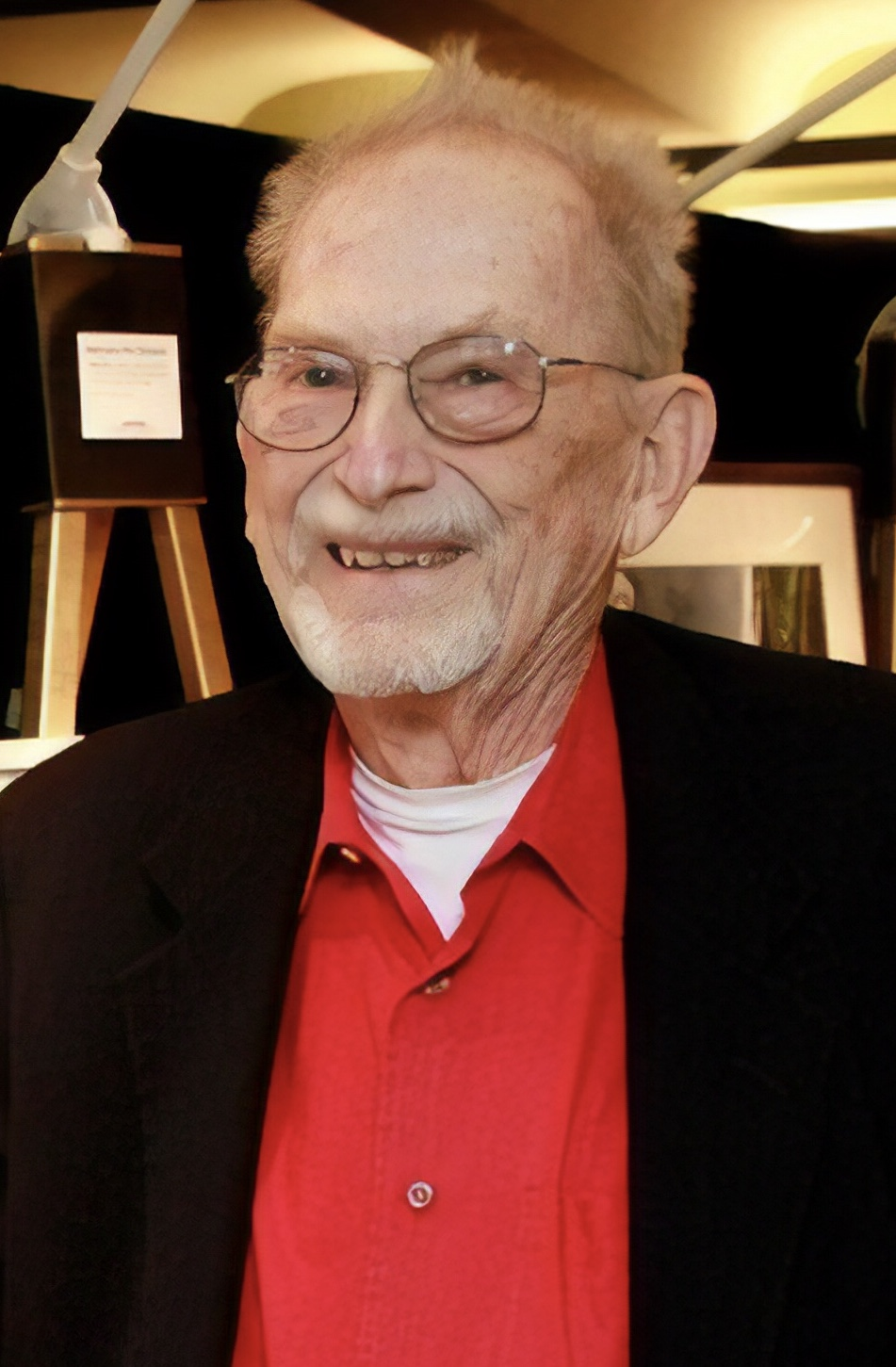
Norman Bridwell, creator and author of the Clifford the Big Red Dog book series.

| Title | Year | Notes |
|---|---|---|
| 1. Clifford, the Big Red Dog | 1963 | The first ten Clifford books were given re-colored illustrations in 1985. The original book is in the public domain in the United States as its copyright was not renewed. However, Clifford's name and some likenesses are still trademarked by Norman Bridwell's estate. The trademark on Emily expired in 2022. |
| 2. Clifford Gets a Job | 1965 | |
| 3. Clifford Takes a Trip | 1966 | |
| 4. Clifford's Halloween | 1966 | |
| 5. Clifford's Tricks | 1969 | |
| 6. Clifford, the Small Red Puppy | 1972 | |
| 7. Clifford's Riddles | 1974 | |
| 8. Clifford's Good Deeds | 1975 | |
| 9. Clifford at the Circus | 1977 | |
| 10. Clifford Goes to Hollywood | 1980 | Reissued in 2010 under the title: Clifford Is a Star |
| 11. Clifford's ABC | 1983 | |
| 12. Clifford's Christmas | 1984 | |
| 13. Clifford's Family | 1984 | |
| 14. Clifford's Kitten | 1984 | |
| 15. Clifford and the Grouchy Neighbors | 1985 | |
| 16. Clifford's Pals | 1985 | Reissued in 2010 under the title: Clifford's Best Pals |
| 17. Clifford's Manners | 1987 | |
| 18. Count on Clifford | 1987 | |
| 19. Clifford's Birthday Party | 1988 | |
| 20. Clifford's Puppy Days | 1989 | |
| 21. Where Is Clifford? | 1989 | |
| 22. Clifford's Happy Days: A Pop-Up Book | 1990 | Pop-up book |
| 23. Clifford's Word Book | 1990 | |
| 24. Clifford, We Love You | 1991 | |
| 25. Clifford's Animal Sounds | 1991 | |
| 26. Clifford's Bathtime | 1991 | |
| 27. Clifford's Bedtime | 1991 | |
| 28. Clifford's Peekaboo | 1991 | |
| 29. Clifford Counts Bubbles | 1992 | |
| 30. Clifford Follows His Nose | 1992 | |
| 31. Clifford's Happy Easter | 1992 | |
| 32. Clifford's Noisy Day | 1992 | |
| 33. Clifford's Thanksgiving Visit | 1993 | |
| 34. Clifford, I Love You | 1994 | Pop-up book |
| 35. Clifford the Firehouse Dog | 1994 | |
| 36. Clifford's First Christmas | 1994 | |
| 37. Clifford and the Big Storm | 1995 | |
| 38. Clifford's First Easter | 1995 | |
| 39. Clifford's First Halloween | 1995 | |
| 40. Clifford's Sports Day | 1996 | |
| 41. Clifford's First Autumn | 1997 | |
| 42. Clifford's Spring Clean-Up | 1997 | |
| 43. Clifford's First Valentine's Day | 1997 | |
| 44. Clifford's Peek-And-Seek Animal Riddles | 1997 | |
| 45. Clifford and the Big Parade | 1998 | |
| 46. Clifford Keeps Cool | 1998 | |
| 47. Clifford Counts 1 2 3 | 1998 | |
| 48. Clifford Makes a Friend | 1998 | |
| 49. Clifford: Where Is the Big Red Doggie? | 1998 | |
| 50. Clifford's First Snow Day | 1998 | |
| 51. Oops, Clifford! | 1998 | |
| 52. Clifford and the Halloween Parade | 1999 | |
| 53. Clifford Grows Up | 1999 | |
| 54. Clifford's Best Friend: A Story about Emily Elizabeth | 1999 | |
| 55. Clifford's Big Book of Things to Know | 1999 | |
| 56. Clifford's First School Day | 1999 | |
| 57. Clifford Barks! | 2000 | |
| 58. Clifford to the Rescue | 2000 | |
| 59. Clifford Visits the Hospital | 2000 | |
| 60. Clifford's Opposites | 2000 | |
| 61. Clifford's Schoolhouse | 2000 | |
| 62. Clifford's Big Red Reader | 2001 | |
| 63. Clifford's Furry Friends | 2001 | |
| 64. Clifford's Happy Mother's Day | 2001 | |
| 65. Clifford's Puppy Fun: A Lift-the-Flap Board Book with Stickers | 2001 | |
| 66. Clifford's Valentines | 2001 | |
| 67. Clifford Runs to Story Time | 2001 | |
| 68. Clifford and the Bath | 2002 | |
| 69. Clifford's Busy Week | 2002 | |
| 70. Clifford Goes to Dog School | 2002 | |
| 71. Clifford's Neighborhood: Lots to Learn All Around Town | 2002 | |
| 72. Clifford the Weather Dog | 2002 | |
| 73. A Little Book About Red | 2003 | Phonics Reading Program |
| 74. Cleo's Fudge Cakes | 2003 | Phonics Reading Program |
| 75. Clifford and the Squirrel | 2003 | Phonics Reading Program |
| 76. Clifford Loves Me! | 2003 | |
| 77. Clifford's Class Trip | 2003 | |
| 78. Clifford's Day with Dad | 2003 | |
| 79. Emily Elizabeth Can't Trade | 2003 | Phonics Reading Program |
| 80. Get That Lunch Box | 2003 | Phonics Reading Program |
| 81. Good Sports | 2003 | Phonics Reading Program |
| 82. Jumping in Puddles | 2003 | Phonics Reading Program |
| 83. Mac the Knight | 2003 | Phonics Reading Program |
| 84. The Singing Birds' Show | 2003 | Phonics Reading Program |
| 85. Spring Is in the Air | 2003 | Phonics Reading Program |
| 86. Clifford's First Sleepover | 2004 | |
| 87. Clifford Goes to Washington | 2005 | |
| 88. Clifford's Puppy Days: Christmas Angel | 2005 | |
| 89. Clifford the Champion | 2009 | |
| 90. Clifford Makes the Team | 2011 | |
| 91. Clifford Goes to Kindergarten | 2015 | Published posthumously |
| 92. Clifford Celebrates Hanukkah | 2015 | Published posthumously |

== Adaptations ==
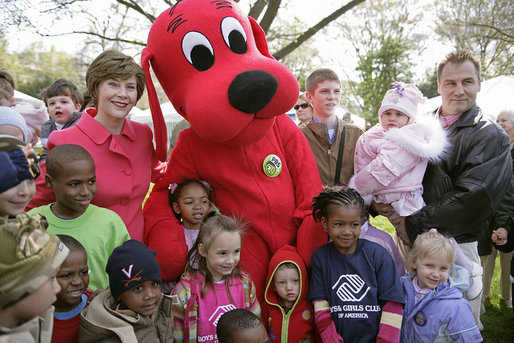
Clifford the Big Red Dog mascot with Laura Bush and children at the White House Easter Egg Roll, 2007.

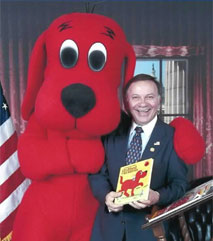
Clifford with former congressman Tom Tancredo

=== Videos ===
Karl-Lorimar Home Video released the video Clifford's Sing Along Adventure in 1986, starring Arthur Howard and theatrical actress Jan Neuberger. Warner Home Video re-released it in the mid-1990s.

In July 1988, Scholastic Studios, Nelvana Limited, and Family Home Entertainment released Clifford's Fun with..., (Note: Alternatively titled in the videos themselves as Clifford the Big Red Dog.) an educational direct-to-video animated series. Six episodes were produced, focusing on fundamental concepts learned by young children: "The ABC Message Service" (letters), "Clifford's Birthday Surprise" (numbers), "The Scavenger Hunt" (shapes and colors), "The Rhyme Cat Rescue" (rhyming), "Clifford Goes to Hollywood" (sounds), and "The Pet Show" (opposites). Musician Brent Titcomb was the voice of Clifford, and actress Alyson Court was the voice of Emily Elizabeth.

=== Television ===
Scholastic Media produced a 65-episode adaptation shown on PBS Kids, which aired from September 2000 to February 2003. Clifford was voiced by John Ritter, and Emily Elizabeth was voiced by Grey DeLisle. There was also a 39-episode prequel series that took place during Clifford's puppyhood, broadcast from September 2003 to February 2006, with Lara Jill Miller as the voice of young Clifford.

A new series was released on December 6, 2019, for Amazon Prime Video and the next day on PBS Kids. Produced by 9 Story Media Group and Brown Bag Films, it stars Adam Sanders and Hannah Levinson as the new voices of Clifford and Emily Elizabeth, respectively. It aired on CBC Kids in Canada, and Sky Kids in the United Kingdom. On May 6, 2026, another Clifford series was revealed, with 9 Story and Brown Bag Films returning to produce the series. It is set to air on PBS Kids in 2027.

=== Films ===
==== 2004 film ====
During the 2000 series' run, a theatrical film was released in February 2004, serving as the series finale, as there were no new episodes released after John Ritter's death the year prior.

==== Unproduced Universal-Illumination version ====
In May 2012, it was reported that Universal Pictures and Illumination Entertainment would make a live-action/CGI animated feature film based on the book. Matt Lopez had been hired to write the script, while Chris Meledandri and Deborah Forte would produce the film. In July 2013, it was reported that Illumination had dropped the project. Two months later, it was reported that the film was still in development at Universal and that there were negotiations to have David Bowers direct the film.

On August 1, 2014, Universal scheduled the film for a release on April 8, 2016, later to be delayed and its release date given to The Boss. On June 30, 2016, it was reported by Deadline Hollywood that Paramount Pictures had picked up the rights for the film and the Universal iteration cancelled. According to the report, "Forte decided to take the material in a new direction," and "Universal let the option lapse." It was further announced that Justin Malen was hired to write the screenplay.

On September 25, 2017, it was announced that Walt Becker would direct the revived project, replacing Bowers. The Paramount iteration, which would eventually turn into the finalized film, was produced by Scholastic Entertainment and Paramount Animation.

==== 2021 Paramount film ====
On February 27, 2019, Paramount announced the film for a November 13, 2020 release, taking over the slot for the cancelled live-action/CGI Rugrats film. The film features child actress Darby Camp as Emily Elizabeth and Jack Whitehall as a new character, Uncle Casey, in their starring roles with Tony Hale as Zac Tieran, the main villain of the film. On August 28, 2020, the film release was pushed back to November 5, 2021, due to the COVID-19 pandemic, with a 20-second teaser trailer released in November that year. The film was subsequently rescheduled to be released on September 17, 2021, but was again delayed due to concerns regarding the rise of the SARS-CoV-2 Delta variant. The film premiered as a part of Paramount's Upcoming Slate Presentation at CinemaCon on August 26, 2021; the film later released theatrically and digitally on Paramount+ on November 10, 2021.

=== Video games ===
==== Book series (2000) ====
- Clifford's Reading
- Clifford's Thinking Games

==== 2000s TV series ====
- Clifford's Learning Activities (2001)
- Clifford's Musical Memory Games (2002)
- Clifford's Phonics (2003)
- Clifford's Big Puzzle Game (Wendy's Kids' Meal DVD game)

=== Stage musical ===
On March 19, 2026, it was announced that TheaterWorksUSA was optioned the rights by Scholastic to make a stage musical adaptation, called Clifford the Big Red Dog: The Musical. The score and lyrics are composed by Sam Tsui and Casey Breves, the book is written by Matt Hoverman, puppetry is directed by Ash Winkfield, and Laura Brandel is the director and choreographer. A preview tour began in May 2026, beginning with The Kupferberg Center of the Arts in Queens, New York on May 19.

== See also ==
- Maxipes Fík
