= Norman Bridwell =

American author and cartoonist

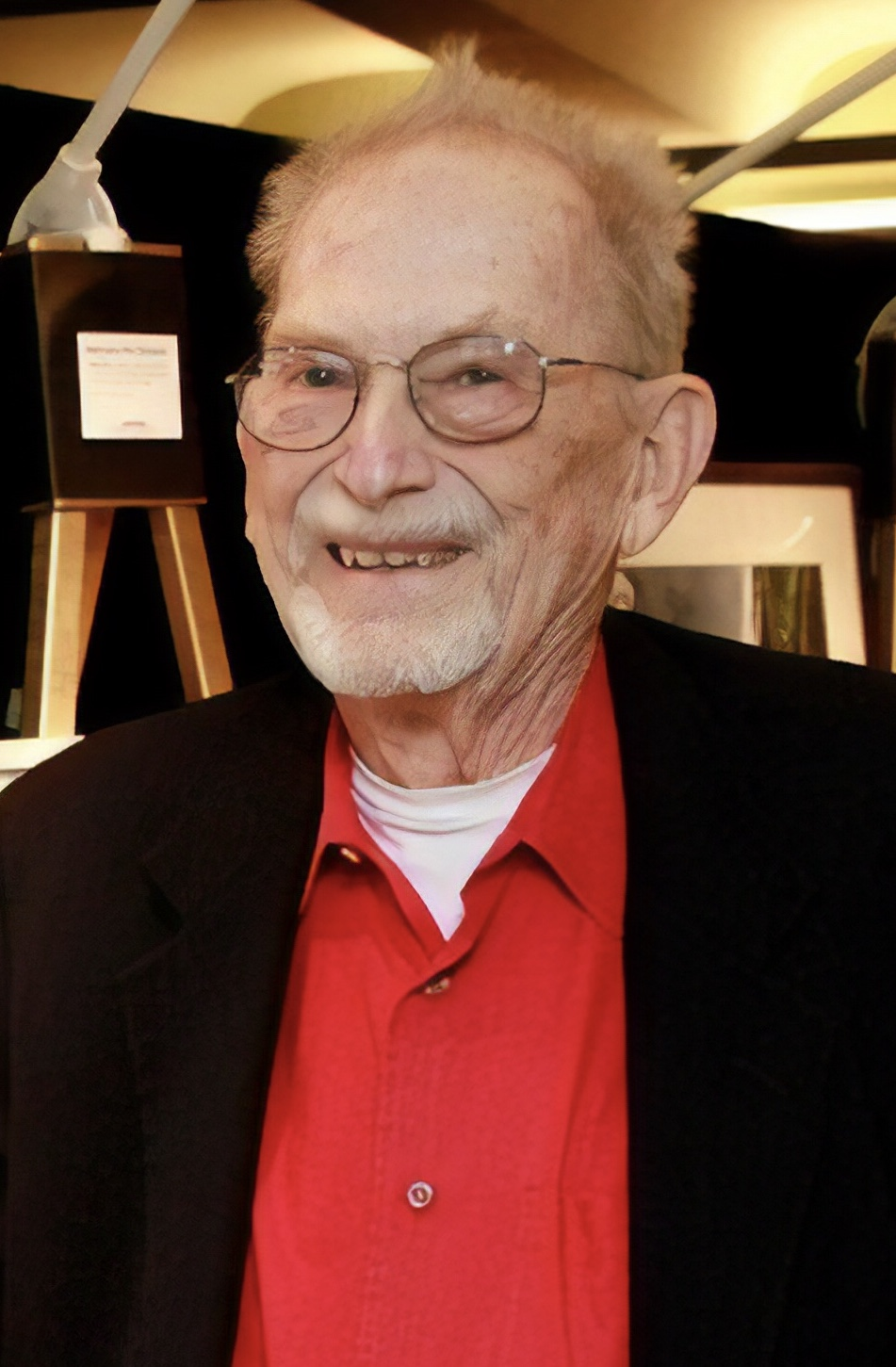
- Bridwell in 2011
- Born: February 15, 1928; Kokomo, Indiana, U.S.
- Died: December 12, 2014 (aged 86); Oak Bluffs, Massachusetts, U.S.
- Occupations: Writer and illustrator
- Spouse: Norma Howard (m. 1958)
- Children: Tim Bridwell and Emily Bridwell Merz
- Writing career
- Genre: Children's literature
- Notable work: Clifford the Big Red Dog

Norman Ray Bridwell (February 15, 1928 – December 12, 2014) was an American author and cartoonist best known for creating the Clifford the Big Red Dog book series.

== Early life and education ==
Bridwell was born on February 15, 1928, in Kokomo, Indiana, to Leona and Vern Bridwell (a homemaker and factory worker, respectively). Growing up, Bridwell was known to draw frequently, however, he never thought of himself as being any good at it. When he attended Kokomo High School in the 1940s he believed that there were always students better than him in his art and writing classes. Nevertheless, after graduating high school in 1945, Bridwell went on to pursue art at the John Herron School of Art at Indiana University – Purdue University Indianapolis and Cooper Union in New York City.

== Career ==
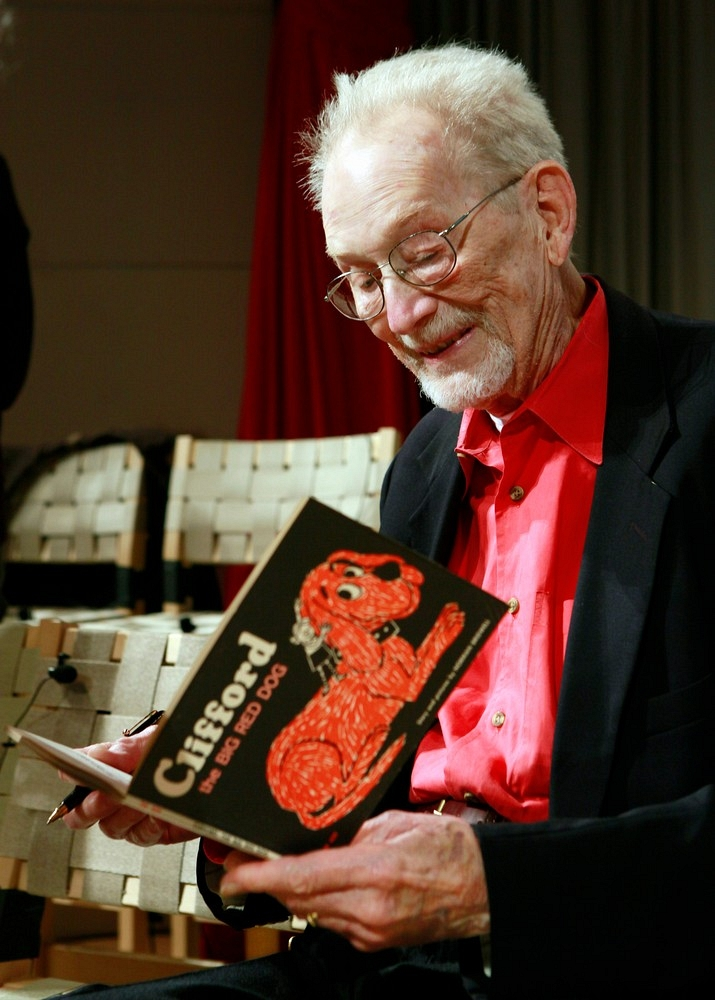
Bridwell holding a copy of the first Clifford the Big Red Dog book in 2011

Bridwell began his artistic career as a freelance commercial artist in New York, however, he still found himself struggling to pay the bills while supporting his wife and young daughter. In order to make some extra money, Bridwell organized a portfolio in 1962 and attempted to get a job as a children's book illustrator, but he was rejected by approximately fifteen publishing houses. While at Harper & Row, an editor, believing that Bridwell's art was not good enough to be sold on its own, suggested he turn one of his drawings into a story. The drawing that the editor picked out for this task was of a young girl and a horse-sized bloodhound, and the story became Clifford the Big Red Dog. The first Clifford book was published in 1963 and spawned over 75 Clifford titles (not all written by Bridwell), three animated television series, merchandise, a live musical, and a live-action film. Clifford serves as the official mascot of Scholastic, the publisher of the series.

The Witch Next Door, originally published in 1965, is yet another successful book written and illustrated by Bridwell. The author presented The Witch Next Door to his editor alongside a new copy of Clifford, only intending to bring along a little extra content to share. The new book concept and drawings had only been thrown together the night before the meeting. Despite this, The Witch Next Door went on to become one of Bridwell's most popular books, leading to a series of six total books built around the witch character.

Other children's books by Bridwell include The Zany Zoo (1963), What Do They Do When It Rains (1969), How to Care for Your Monster (1970), and A Tiny Family (1974). There are over 126 million copies of his books in print in 13 languages.

== Personal life ==
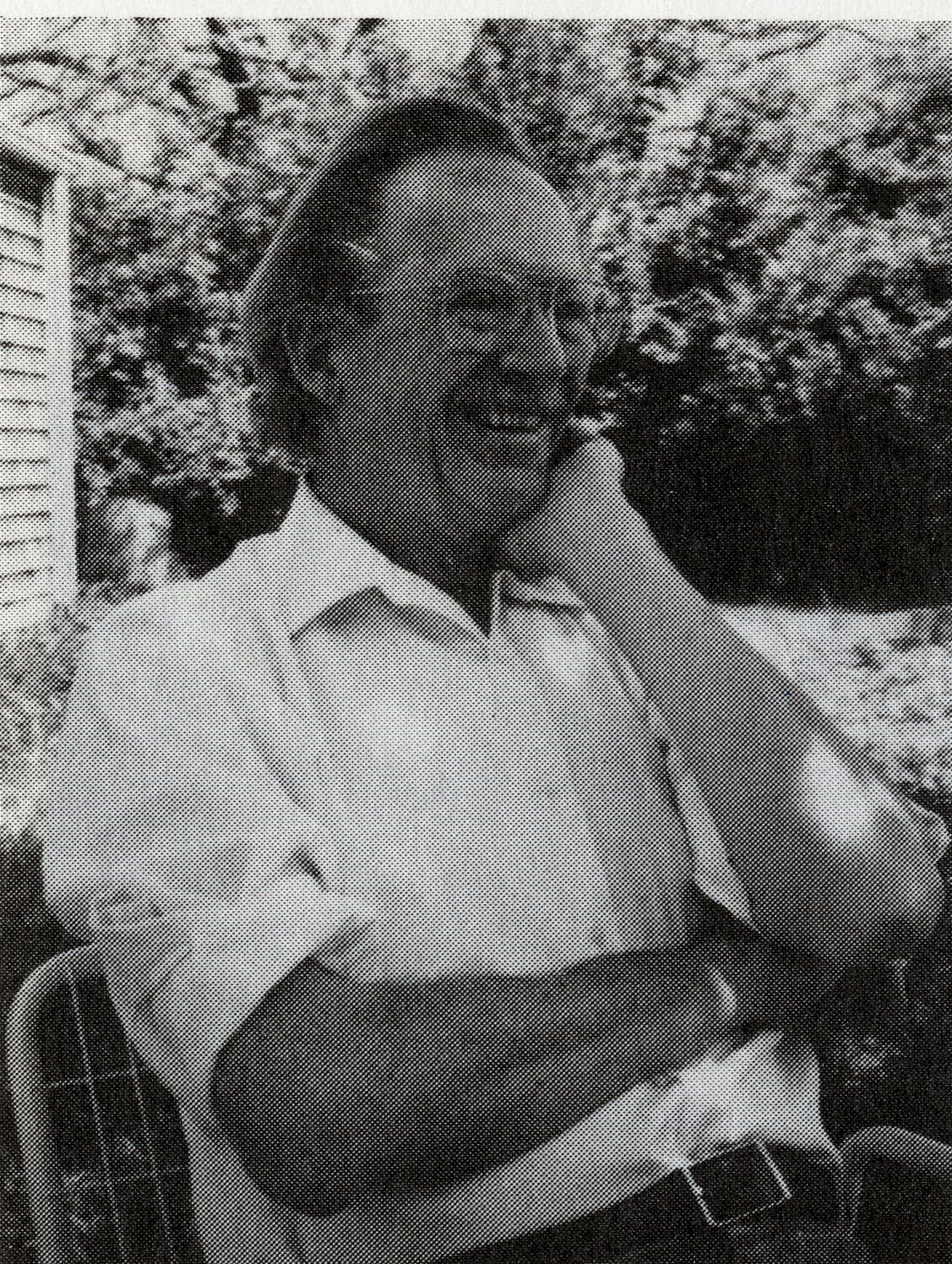
Norman Bridwell in 1988

On Friday, June 13, 1958, Norman Bridwell was married to his wife Norma Ellen Howard after having courted her for three years. They were originally introduced to each other by a mutual colleague who thought they would be perfect for each other after observing their many similarities: they were both commercial artists, they were both from Indiana, and their names were so similar. The newlyweds honeymooned at Martha's Vineyard, a trip that inspired them to vacation there several more times before eventually moving there years later. Norma and Norman Bridwell had a daughter they named Emily Elizabeth Merz and a son named Tim. At the time of Bridwell's death, they had three grandchildren.

The Bridwells resided in Edgartown, Massachusetts on Martha's Vineyard, from 1969 until Norman Bridwell's death in 2014.

== Death ==
Bridwell died at Martha's Vineyard Hospital on December 12, 2014, at the age of 86 from prostate cancer; Norman's wife Norma stated he had been in the hospital for three weeks before his death after a fall at his home. His funeral was held at the Federated Church on South Summer street in Edgartown. He was cremated, and his ashes were given to his son, Tim.
